= John de Vries =

John de Vries may refer to:

- John de Vries (racing driver) (born 1966), Australian racing driver
- John de Vries (designer), Dutch automobile designer
