= Renault F-Type engine =

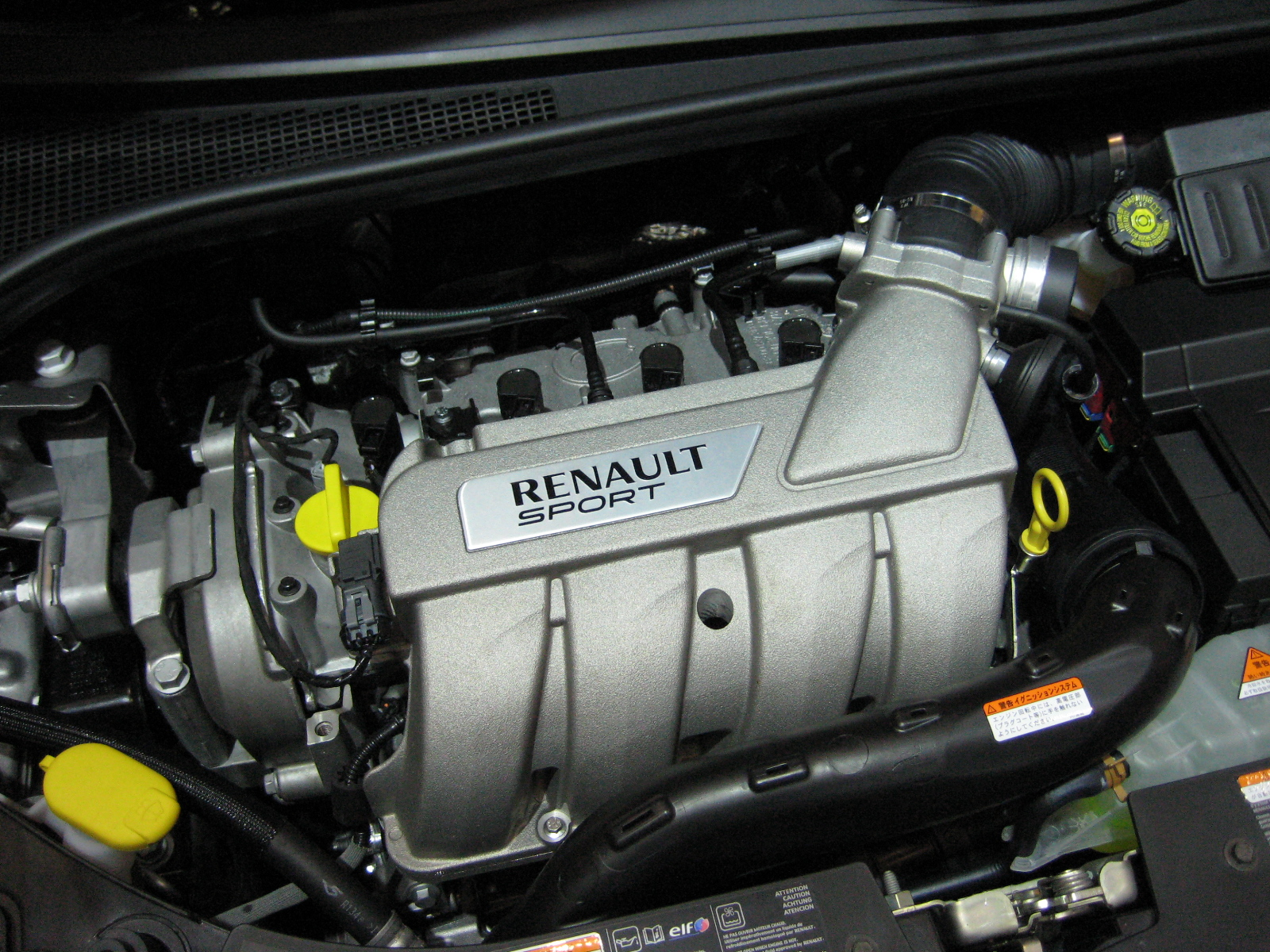

Overview
- Manufacturer: Renault
- Production: 1982–present

Layout
- Configuration: I4
- Displacement: 1.6 L (1,596 cc); 1.7 L (1,721 cc); 1.8 L (1,764 cc); 1.8 L (1,783 cc); 1.8 L (1,794 cc); 1.9 L (1,870 cc); 2.0 L (1,965 cc); 2.0 L (1,998 cc)
- Cylinder bore: 78 mm (3.07 in); 80 mm (3.15 in); 81 mm (3.19 in); 82 mm (3.23 in); 82.7 mm (3.26 in)
- Piston stroke: 83.5 mm (3.29 in); 93 mm (3.66 in)
- Cylinder block material: Cast iron
- Cylinder head material: Aluminum alloy
- Valvetrain: SOHC 2 valves x cyl. DOHC 4 valves x cyl.

Combustion
- Turbocharger: Diesel and sports versions
- Fuel system: Carburettor, Fuel injection
- Fuel type: Gasoline/Diesel
- Cooling system: Water-cooled

Chronology
- Predecessor: Cléon-Alu engine Douvrin engine
- Successor: Renault K-Type engine Renault M-Type engine Renault R-Type engine

F Renault engine (F for fonte, French for cast iron) initially named the "Fonte-Cléon engine" · (a designation rarely used to avoid confusion with the Cléon-Fonte engine) is an automotive internal combustion engine, four-stroke, inline-four engine bored directly into the iron block, water cooled, with overhead camshaft driven by a timing belt, and with an aluminum cylinder head, developed and produced by Renault in the early '80s, making its appearance on the Renault 9 and 11. This engine is available in petrol and diesel versions, with 8 or 16 valves.

== History ==
In December 1982, the Renault Board presented a new 1,596 cc (1.6 L) diesel engine with 55 PS (40 kW; 54 hp) for the Renault 9. Known as "F8M", the new engine was designed by engineer George Douin and his team and broke with tradition by not featuring removable cylinder liners, thanks to advances in metallurgy that significantly slowed the wear of rubbing mechanical parts. The new four-cylinder unit adopted an overhead camshaft driven by a toothed belt that also controls the diesel injection pump. A second belt rotates the alternator and water pump, while a vacuum pump located at the rear operates the brake servo. The cast iron block is topped by a light alloy cylinder head featuring Ricardo Comet prechambers. The engine is mounted transversely inclined rearwards 12°. In the autumn of 1983, the diesel was added to the new Renault 11 hatchback derivative.

In the autumn of 1983, Renault launched the 1,721 cc (1.7 L) F2N petrol engine, using the block of the F8M. It has a diesel-type architecture, with combustion chambers integrated with the piston design. Since the petrol version does not require water channels in the block, a bigger bore was possible than in the smaller diesel version. It first appeared in twin carburettor form in the Renault 11 GTX, TXE, and the TXE Electronic with digital meter and speech synthesis. In February 1984, the F2N was added to the Renault 9 GTX and TXE. This engine was called the B172 by Volvo.

Thereafter, the F8M was also used in the Renault 5 Express (Rapid/Extra), and the Volvo 300 series. The F2N was installed in the Renault 21, Renault 5, Renault 19, Renault Clio, Volvo 340/360 and also the Volvo 400 series (where it was designated B18KP by Volvo). A version with a single-barrel carburetor was installed in some early Renault Trafic models and some R21, called the F1N. The 1,721 cc (1.7 L) petrol version was also built with multi-point fuel injection as the F3N, fitted to GTE models of the Renault 5 and 11 sold in some countries such as Switzerland and Germany — as the old carburetted turbo Cléon-Fonte engines no longer met the pollution standards in these countries. US versions of the Renault 9 and Renault 11 (Renault Alliance and Encore) were equipped with a single, throttle-body injected EFI system utilizing equipment from Jeep/Chrysler – this is true for all 1.7-liter applications as well as the 2.0 liter found in the one-year-only 1987 GTA.

Volvo built turbocharged versions of the F2N with multipoint fuel injection (designated "B18FT"), installed in the Volvo 480 Turbo, the 440 Turbo Volvo and Volvo 460 Turbo. These engines are sought after to fit to Renault 5 GT Turbo, Renault 9 Turbo and Renault 11 Turbo.

Production is centered on Renault's engine manufacturing facility at Cléon, near Rouen in Normandy.

== Evolution ==
=== Diesel versions ===
Beginning in 1987, the 1.6D underwent changes to make it more quiet. This F8M second generation was unfortunately weaker at the cylinder head and head gasket. More asbestos was being dropped, which was exacerbated the problems of cylinder head gaskets. Externally, a second generation F8M known by its cylinder head cover 6 which is secured by small screws, while a first generation F8M 3 has closed nuts for securing the valve cover. The housing for the F8M second generation had a non-painted surface around the injection pump, while the first generation F8M had completely black casing.

In 1988, Renault launched the Renault 19 as the replacement for the Renault 9 and Renault 11. The preceding F8M 1.6 D diesel engine developed 55 bhp (41 kW; 56 PS), but since it was not powerful enough to power the heavier Renault 19, Renault changed the stroke and bore of the 1.6 D, to obtain 1,870 cc (1.9 L) (1.9 D) which gave rise to F8Q which was developing 65 bhp (48 kW; 66 PS). This engine would also eventually be used in the Clio 1, Clio-based Express (Rapid / Extra), Renault 21, Kangoo, Mégane 1 and Trafic 1. A lower powered version producing 55 PS (40 kW; 54 bhp) DIN was introduced in the 1990s. The second generation F8Q cylinder heads and head-gaskets were problematic.

At the end of 1988, a turbocharged version of the 1.9 D was sold with the R19 model, which was designated F8QT. It developed 95 bhp (71 kW; 96 PS) DIN. It was also used in the Renault Mégane 1, Volvo 440, Volvo 460, Volvo S40, V40 and Mitsubishi Carisma.

In the autumn of 1997, Renault introduced the 1.9 dT as their first version of the engine with Direct injection, the 1.9 dTi, designated as engine type F9Q. It was being used in the Mégane 1, Scénic 1, Laguna 1, Kangoo 1, Clio 2, Mitsubishi Carisma and the Volvo S40 and V40.

In July 1999, the 1.9 dTi was upgraded to common rail higher pressure injection. This, the F9Q, was Renault's first dCi engine. It appeared in the Laguna 1 Phase 2. The 1.9 dCi was also used in the Mégane 1 Phase 2, Scénic 1 Phase 2, Laguna 2, Mégane 2, Scénic 2, Espace 3, Espace 4, Trafic 2, Master 2, Volvo S40, Volvo V40, Mitsubishi Carisma, Suzuki Grand Vitara, Nissan Primera and so on.

=== Gasoline versions ===
In 1986, the Renault 21 2.0 was introduced, with a displacement of 1,965 cc (2.0 L), with F2R using a twin-barrel carburetor and F3R, injection version. The F3R with 1,965 cc (2.0 L) also equipped the Renault Alliance GTA in North America.

In early 1989 Renault premiered the sports version of the Renault 19, replacing the Renault 9 Turbo and Renault 11 Turbo, although it only went on sale in the second half of 1990. Renault abandoned its 1.4 Cléon-Fonte turbo carburetor in favor of a multi-valve engine with multipoint injection, an evolution of the engine of the 1,721 cc (1.7 L) F2N. The stroke remained the same, but the bore was increased by 1 mm, giving a displacement of 1,764 cc (1.8 L). The cast-iron block was topped by a 16-valve alloy cylinder head. This, the F7P engine, had 140 PS (103 kW; 138 hp) and was also used in the Clio 16S from February 1991, replacing the Super 5 GT Turbo. Starting in July 1992, the Clio 16S and 16S R19 were fitted as standard with a catalytic converter in order to comply with pollution standards applicable from 1 January 1993, losing three horsepower in the process.

The Renault Clio Williams appeared in 1993. This was not only meant to celebrate titles gleaned in Formula 1 with Frank Williams' team, but also to be homologated for competition (requiring a minimum production of 2,500). In order to run in Group A, Renault needed a 2.0-liter engine to be the best equipped in its class. Starting with the F7P engine block from the Renault Clio 16S, Renault developed the 1,998 cc (2.0 L) F7R with 150 PS (110 kW; 148 bhp). The increase in capacity was obtained by boring out the engine by 0.7 mm (0.03 in) and by adopting the diesel engine's crankshaft, thus increasing the stroke from 83.5 to 93 mm (3.29 to 3.66 in). This stronger crankshaft was also better able to cope with the increased torque, which now reached 175 N⋅m (129 lb⋅ft) at 4,500 rpm. The F7R was also used in the Mégane 1 and Renault Spider.

Starting from 1 January 1993, all car models would be equipped with a fuel injection system and a catalytic converter. Here the F2N of 1,721 cc (1.7 L) saw increased bore and therefore a new cylinder capacity of 1,794 cc (1.8 L). It would be known as the "F3P" on the Renault Clio 1 and 19, and "B18U" on the Volvo 440 and Volvo 460. In contrast, the Renault 21, then at the end of its lifespan retained its 1,721 cc (1.7 L), but with injection (type motor F3N). Volvo would also retain the 1,721 cc (1.7 L) injection (type motor B18EP), alongside the new 1,794 cc (1.8 L). In 1994, the Laguna would be equipped with the F3P engine.

Volvo also marketed a 1,596 cc (1.6 L) petrol version with multipoint injection, sold as the "B16F" in Volvo nomenclature. It was installed in the Volvo 440 and 460 models. Peculiarly, this engine had the same bore and stroke (and resulting displacement) as the diesel F8M engine.

Version 8 valves engine F7R 115 PS (85 kW; 113 bhp) would appear on Laguna 1, it was also used in the Mégane 1 and Scenic Area 1 and 3, and was there known as the "F3R." In the Volvo 440, 460 and 480, the engine was known as the "B20F". The new 1,998 cc (2.0 L) F3R replaced the old 1,965 cc (2.0 L) F3R engine.

The F4P first appeared in 1998, in the Phase 2 model of the first generation Laguna. This new 16 valve 1.8 L (1,783 cc) was also used in the first Mégane Scénic and the second generation Laguna. At the same time, the bigger F4R was used in the Laguna and Espace (third generation), with the same engine size as the F7R 1,998 cc (2.0 L) from the Clio Williams. It also ended up in the second and third generation Mégane as well as the second Laguna. The F4P and F4R engines was specifically known by their 16-valve cylinder head, similar to the K4J and K4M versions of K-Type engine. The F4P and F4R engines shared the same distribution kit and water pump of the 16 valved K-Type engines (K4J and K4M).

In 1999, the F5R engine was introduced. This was an F7R engine, equipped with direct injection. This 16 valve DI engine was used in the Mégane coupé and convertible, as well as the Laguna 2. This was the first produced French petrol engine with direct injection.

In 1999, Renault launched the Clio 2 RS, powered by the 1,998 cc (2.0 L) F4R 16 valve engine with 172 PS (127 kW; 170 bhp). The engine, sourced from the Laguna, was tuned by Mecachrome and fitted with 2-stage variable valve timing on the intake cam, matched inlet and exhaust ports and 4-into-1 exhaust headers. In 2001 the Phase 2 F4R received electronic throttle control. In 2004, the Phase 3 version of the Clio 2 RS gained 10 PS (7 kW; 10 bhp) for a total of 182 PS (134 kW; 180 bhp) using 4-2-1 exhaust headers, changes to the intake manifold and exhaust system (the new twin rear mufflers requiring the removal of the spare wheel well in the boot). Power was increased further in 2006 for the Clio 3 RS, now with 197 PS (145 kW; 194 bhp), using further improvements to the intake and exhaust, notably continuously variable valve timing on the intake cam. The output for the Clio was increased again to 203 PS (149 kW; 200 bhp) for the Phase 2 model of the third generation Clio RS.

The F4R would also be made with a turbo, and then known as the F4Rt. It would equip two Mégane, Laguna 2, Laguna 3 Avantime and Vel Satis, but especially this basis was used for the Mégane 2 RS 225 bhp (228 PS; 168 kW) (230 bhp (233 PS; 172 kW) version of the F1 Team R26 and R26.R.

The Mégane RS 3 was presented in March 2009 at the Geneva show. It was equipped with the 2.0 16V Turbo block F4Rt the Mégane 2 RS with variable valve timing, increased to 250 PS (184 kW; 247 bhp). In June 2011, Renault launched a limited edition "RS Trophy 'power increased to 265 PS (195 kW; 261 bhp), followed by a 275 PS (202 kW; 271 bhp) version.

== Cylinder capacities ==
Engine types	Displacement	Bore x stroke
Diesel
F8M	1,596 cc (1.6 L)	78 mm × 83.5 mm (3.07 in × 3.29 in)
F8Q — F8QT — F9Q	1,870 cc (1.9 L)	80 mm × 93 mm (3.15 in × 3.66 in)
Gasoline
B16F	1,596 cc (1.6 L)	78 mm × 83.5 mm (3.07 in × 3.29 in)
F1N — F2N — F3N — B18KP — B18E — B18EP — B18F — B18FT	1,721 cc (1.7 L)	81 mm × 83.5 mm (3.19 in × 3.29 in)
F7P	1,764 cc (1.8 L)	82 mm × 83.5 mm (3.23 in × 3.29 in)
F4P	1,783 cc (1.8 L)	82.7 mm × 83 mm (3.26 in × 3.27 in)
F3P — B18U	1,794 cc (1.8 L)	82.7 mm × 83.5 mm (3.26 in × 3.29 in)
F2R — F3R	1,965 cc (2.0 L)	82 mm × 93 mm (3.23 in × 3.66 in)
F3R — F7R — F5R — F4R — F4RT — B20F	1,998 cc (2.0 L)	82.7 mm × 93 mm (3.26 in × 3.66 in)

== Discontinued ==
=== F1x ===
The F1x was only available with a displacement of 1.7 L (1,721 cc). It has a parallel valve engine architecture aspirated by a single-barrel carburetor.

Applications:

- F1N 1.7 L (1,721 cc; 105.0 cu in), B x S: 81 mm × 83.5 mm (3.19 in × 3.29 in).
  - 1984–1997 Renault Trafic

=== F2x ===
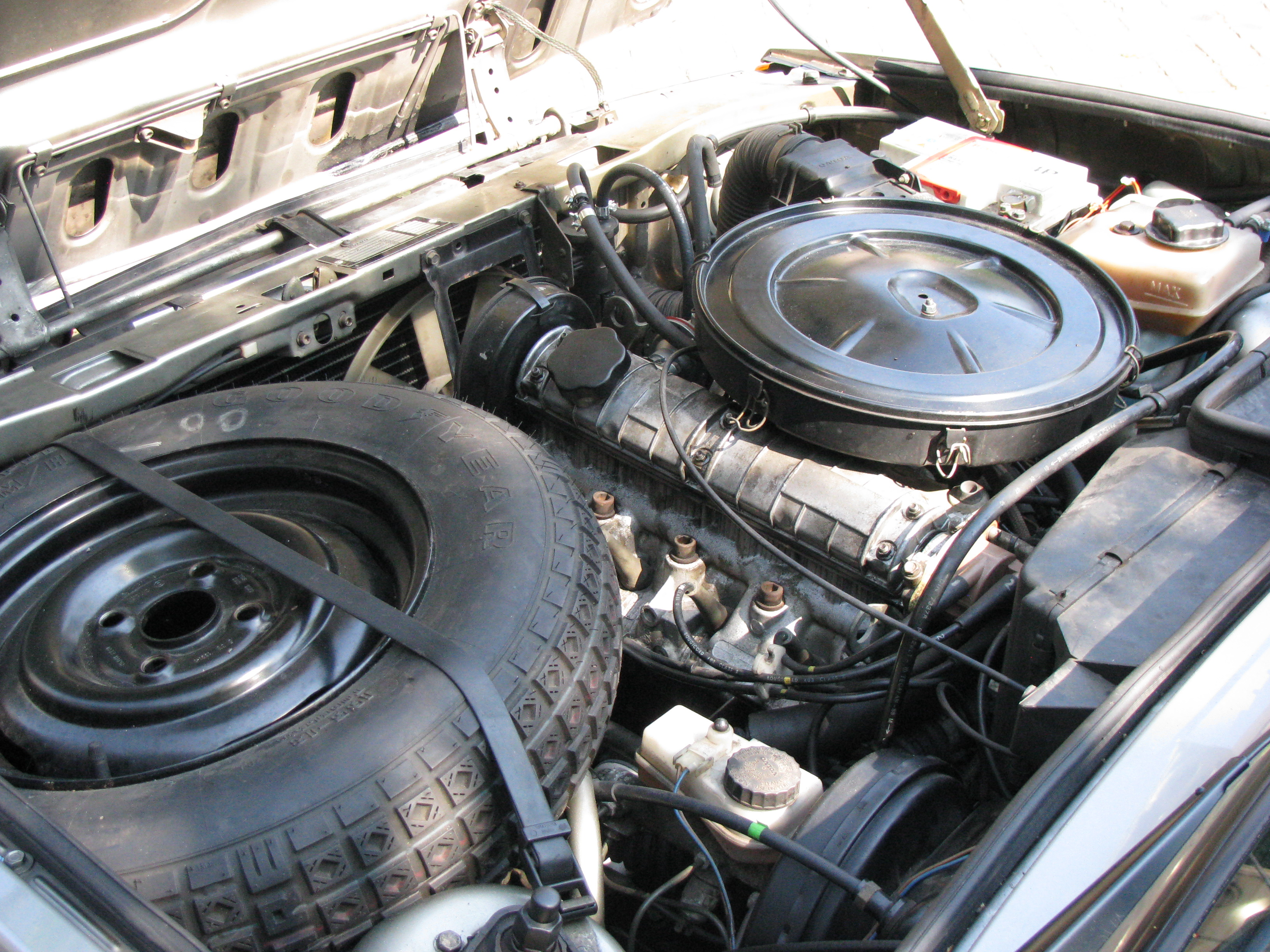
The 1,721 cc (1.7 L) F2N engine was called B172 when installed in Volvos, here in a 340

The F2x is an eight-valve SOHC with double-barrel carburetor.

Applications:

- F2N 1.7 L (1,721 cc; 105.0 cu in), B x S: 81 mm × 83.5 mm (3.19 in × 3.29 in).
  - 1983–1989 Renault R11
  - 1984–1989 Renault R9
  - 1986–1995 Renault R21
  - 1988–1996 Renault R19
  - 1990–1997 Renault Clio I
  - 1985–1990 Renault Super 5
  - 1987–1990 Volvo 340/360
- F2R 2.0 L (1,965 cc; 119.9 cu in), B x S: 82 mm × 93 mm (3.23 in × 3.66 in).
  - 1986–1993 Renault R21 (No official Renault references known, some says 90 PS (66 kW; 89 bhp), others 102 PS (75 kW; 101 bhp)).

=== F3x ===
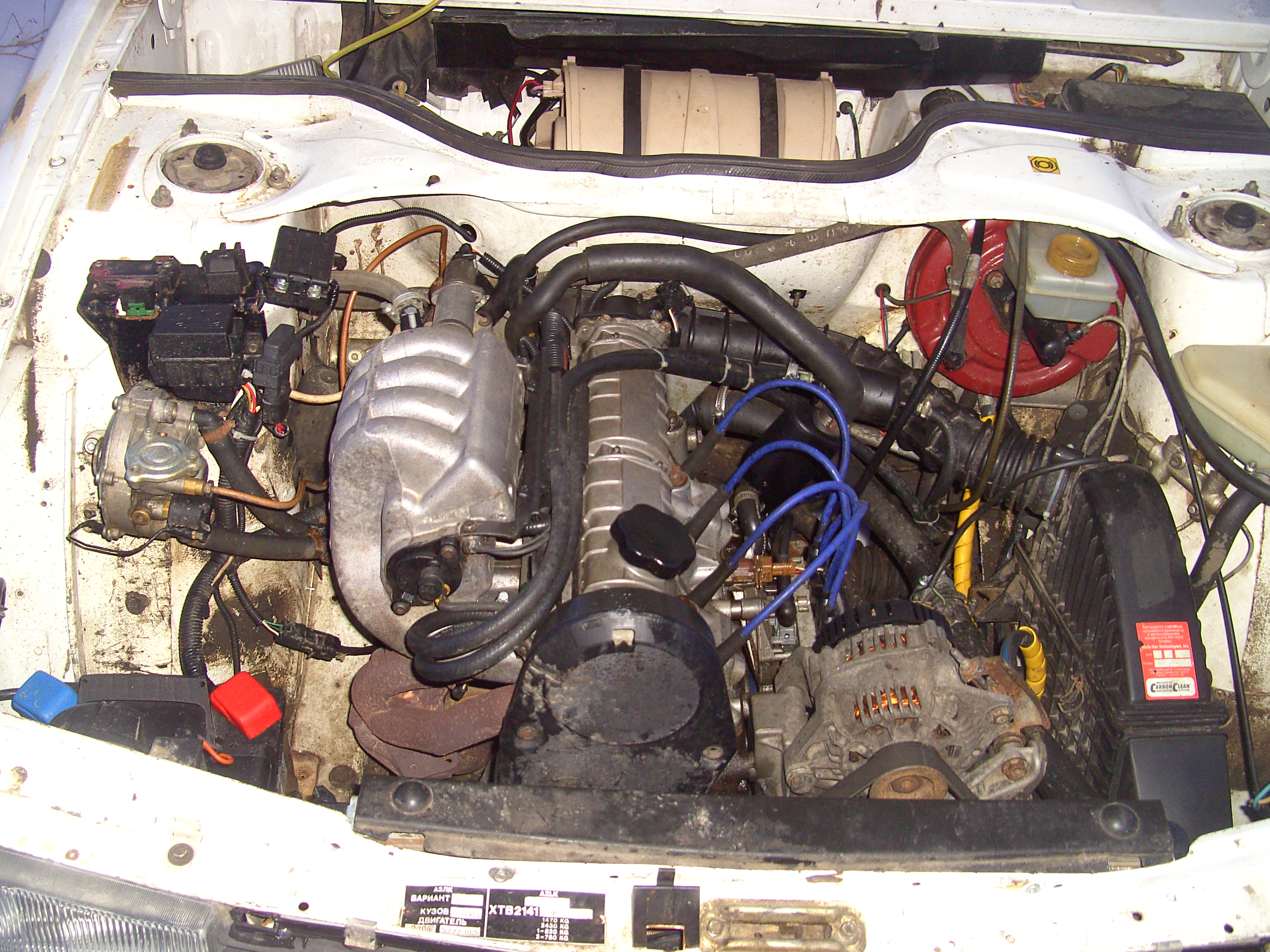
An F3R engine, installed in a Moskvitch 214145 "Svyatogor"

The F3x is mechanically similar to the F2x, only used a monopoint-EFI system. Some later versions were equipped with multi-point fuel injection. A turbocharged version designed by Porsche was available for the Volvo 400-series.

Applications:

- F3N 1.7 L (1,721 cc; 105.0 cu in), B x S: 81 mm × 83.5 mm (3.19 in × 3.29 in).
  - 1985–1989 Renault R11
  - 1985–1989 Renault R9
  - 1986–1995 Renault R21
  - 1988–2000 Renault R19
  - 1985–1993 Renault Super 5
  - 1985–1987 Renault Alliance/Encore (USA & Canada TBI only)
  - 1986–1992 Volvo 440/460, Volvo 480
- F3P 1.8 L (1,794 cc; 109.5 cu in), B x S: 82.7 mm × 83.5 mm (3.26 in × 3.29 in).
  - 1988–2000 Renault R19
  - 1992–1997 Renault Clio RSi
  - 1994–1999 Renault Laguna I
  - 1993–1996 Volvo 440/460
- F3R 2.0 L (1,965 cc; 119.9 cu in), B x S: 82 mm × 93 mm (3.23 in × 3.66 in).
  - 1987– Renault Alliance GTA Special F3R Variant of F3N for 1987 Spec USA GTA only.
- F3R 2.0 L (1,998 cc; 121.9 cu in), B x S: 82.7 mm × 93 mm (3.26 in × 3.66 in).
  - 1993–1996 Volvo 440/460, Volvo 480
  - 1994–2001 Renault Laguna I
  - 1996–2000 Renault Espace III
  - 1996–2002 Renault Megane I
  - 1998–2002 Moskvitch 214145 "Svyatogor" (Russia only)

=== F4x ===
The F4x is an indirect actuated 16-valve DOHC with a multi-point fuel injection system.

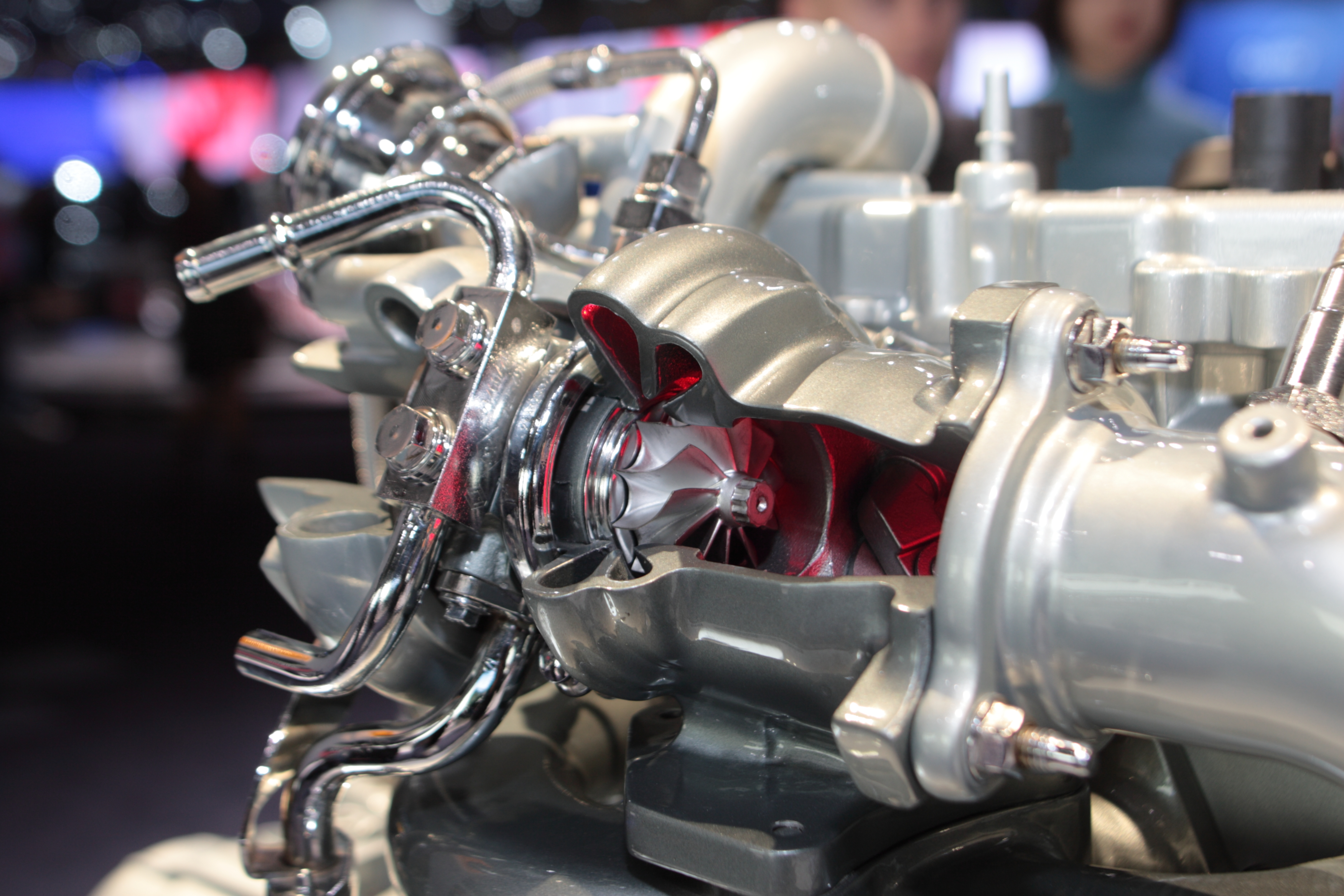
Twin-scroll turbo on the F4Rt engine

- F4P 1.8 L (1,783 cc; 108.8 cu in), B x S: 82.7 mm × 83 mm (3.26 in × 3.27 in).
  - 1998–2001 Renault Laguna I
  - 2001–2005 Renault Laguna II
  - 2002–2005 Proton Waja 1.8L
- F4R 2.0 L (1,998 cc; 121.9 cu in), B x S: 82.7 mm × 93 mm (3.26 in × 3.66 in).
  - 1998–2000 Renault Laguna I
  - 2002–2007 Renault Laguna II
  - 2003–2009 Renault Mégane
  - 2003–2008/11 Renault Scénic
  - 2000–2003 Renault Scénic RX4
  - 1998–2014 Renault Espace
  - 2000–2012 Renault Clio Renault Sport (172, 182, 197 and 200)
  - 2001–2014 Renault Trafic (120)
  - 2000–2020 Formula Renault 2.0
  - 2010–2023 Dacia Duster
  - 2013– Praga R1
  - 2015/09–2021/12 Renault Sandero R.S. 2.0
  - 2017–2022 Renault Captur (Brazil, Russia)
- F4Rt 2.0 L (1,998 cc; 121.9 cu in), B x S: 82.7 mm × 93 mm (3.26 in × 3.66 in).
  - 2002–2003 Renault Avantime
  - 2002–2009 Renault Vel Satis
  - 2002–2014 Renault Espace
  - 2002–2007 Renault Laguna II — Twin-scroll turbo by Mitsubishi with 165–180 hp (with overboost 190 hp on TCe 180)
  - 2003–2009 Renault Scénic II — Twin-scroll turbo by Mitsubishi with 165–180 hp (with overboost 190 hp on TCe 180)
  - 2003–2009 Renault Mégane II Sport 225 bhp (168 kW; 228 PS)/230 bhp (172 kW; 233 PS)
  - 2005–2007 Renault Laguna II GT 205 bhp (153 kW; 208 PS)
  - 2007–2015 Renault Laguna III 170 bhp (127 kW; 172 PS)
  - 2008–2015 Renault Laguna III GT 205 bhp (153 kW; 208 PS)
  - 2009–2017 Renault Mégane R.S. 250 PS (184 kW; 247 bhp)/265 PS (195 kW; 261 bhp)/275 PS (202 kW; 271 bhp)
  - 2009–2016 Renault Fluence GT 180 bhp (134 kW; 182 PS)
  - 2010–2017 Renault Mégane III TCe 180

=== F5x ===
The F5x resembles the F4x mechanically with an architecture of 16 indirect actuated valves and DOHC, but used a "direct injection IDE" fuel system. It was only offered in a 2-liter version.

Applications:

- F5R 2.0 L (1,998 cc; 121.9 cu in), B x S: 82.7 mm × 93 mm (3.26 in × 3.66 in).
  - 1999–2003 Renault Mégane I
  - 2001–2003 Renault Laguna II

=== F7x ===
The F7x was the first of the F-type engine family with a 16-valve DOHC configuration, the valves were directly actuated by Hydraulic tappets. Both the 1.8 and the 2.0-litre versions were equipped with a multi-point fuel injection system.

Applications:

- F7P 1.8 L (1,764 cc; 107.6 cu in), B x S: 82 mm × 83.5 mm (3.23 in × 3.29 in).
  - 1988–1997 Renault R19
  - 1991–1996 Renault Clio I
- F7R 2.0 L (1,998 cc; 121.9 cu in), B x S: 82.7 mm × 93 mm (3.26 in × 3.66 in).
  - 1993–1996 Renault Clio Williams
  - 1996–1999 Renault Mégane I
  - 1995–1999 Renault Sport Spider
  - 1999–2001 Moskvitch 214242 "Ivan Kalita" (Russia only)

=== F8x ===
The F8x is an indirect injected diesel version with an 8-valve SOHC architecture. It uses precombustion chambers to achieve the required air/fuel mixing.

Applications:

- F8M 1.6 L (1,596 cc; 97 cu in), B x S: 78 mm × 83.5 mm (3.07 in × 3.29 in).
  - 1982–1989 Renault R9
  - 1983–1989 Renault R11
  - 1985–1996 Renault Super 5
  - 1986–1994 Renault Express/Rapid/Extra
  - 1984–1990 Volvo 340/360 ("Volvo D16")
- F8Q 1.9 L (1,870 cc; 114.1 cu in), B x S: 80 mm × 93 mm (3.15 in × 3.66 in).
  - 1991–2000 Renault Express/Rapid/Extra
  - 1988–2000 Renault R19
  - 1990–1995 Renault R21
  - 1991–1998 Renault Clio I
  - 1998–2001 Renault Clio II
  - 1995–2002 Renault Mégane I
  - 1996–2003 Renault Scénic I
  - 1997–2001 Renault Trafic
  - 2002–2006 Dacia Pick-Up
  - 2003–2005 Dacia Solenza
  - 1994–1998 Mitsubishi Carisma
  - 2001–2004 Suzuki Samurai (built by Santana)
  - 1994–1996 Volvo 440/460
  - 1995–2000 Volvo S40/V40

=== F9x ===
The F9x is the direct injected Diesel version and also features an 8-valve SOHC configuration, it has swirl generating intake ports to create swirling (vortex) of the aspirated air, and either a toroidal- or an elsbett-shaped piston bowl to twist the injected fuel vapour, also to achieve the required air/fuel mixing. The diesel fuel is delivered either by a mechanical injection pump (dTi) or a common rail fuel injection (dCi) installation.

Applications:

- F9Q 1.9 L (1,870 cc; 114.1 cu in), B x S: 80 mm × 93 mm (3.15 in × 3.66 in).
  - 1995–2012 Renault Mégane
  - 1999–2002 Renault Espace III
  - 1996–2003 Renault Scénic I
  - 1997–2010 Renault Master
  - 1997–2001 Renault Laguna I
  - 1998–2004 Mitsubishi Carisma
  - 1998–2004 Mitsubishi Spacestar
  - 2000–2004 Volvo S40/V40
  - 2001–2005 Renault Laguna II
  - 2000–2002 Renault Clio
  - 2001–2006 Renault Trafic II
  - 2001–2006 Vauxhall Vivaro
  - 2001–2006 Opel Vivaro
  - 2002–2005 Nissan Interstar X70
  - 2002–2008 Nissan Primera P12
  - 2002–2006 Nissan Primastar
  - 2003–2009 Renault Scénic II
  - 2005–2015 Suzuki Vitara
  - 2009–2011 Renault Scénic III
