= Volvo 440/460 =

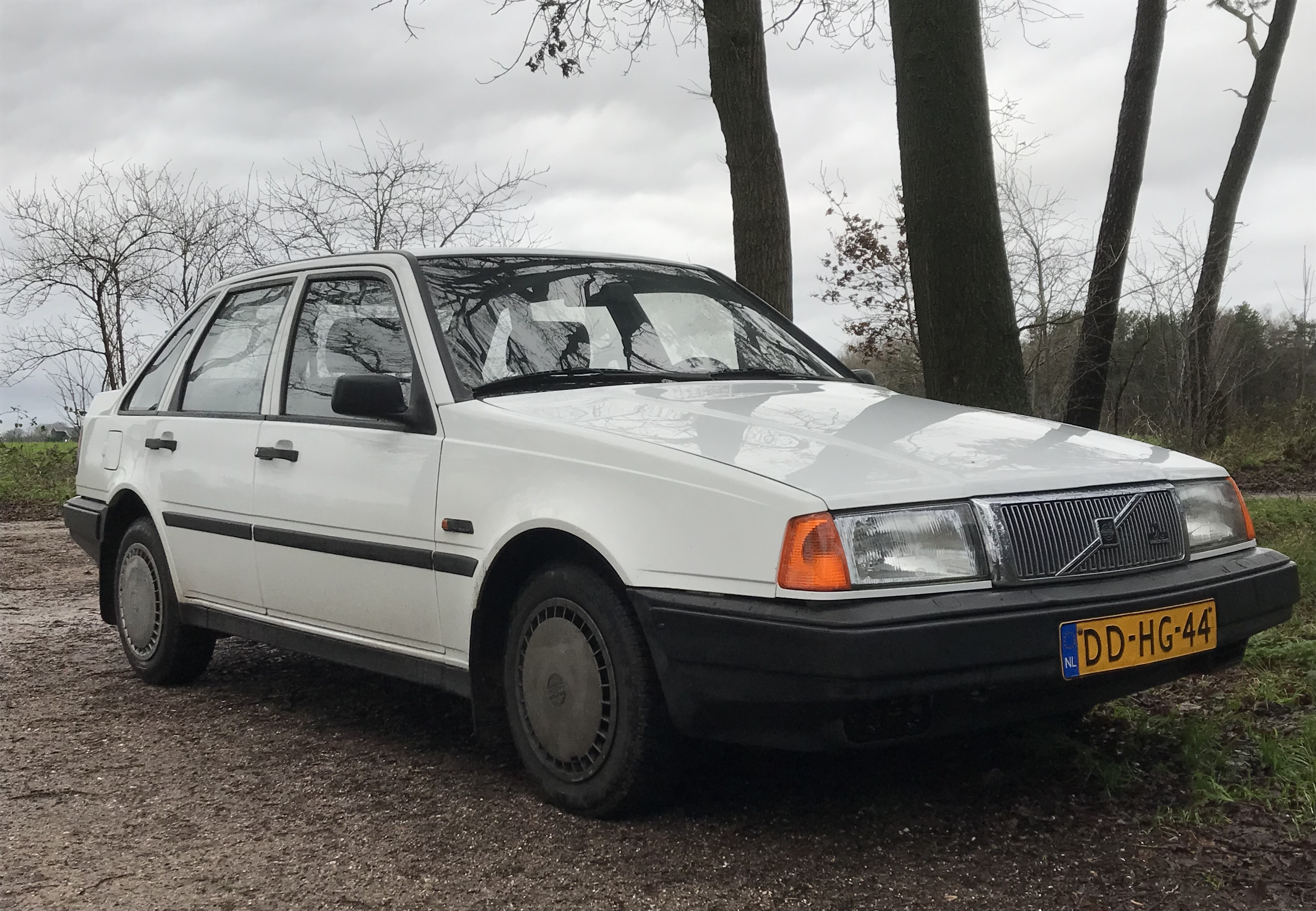
- Pre-facelift Volvo 440

Overview
- Manufacturer: Volvo Cars
- Production: June 1988 – September 1996
- Assembly: Netherlands: Born (NedCar)
- Designer: Peter van Kuilenburg

Body and chassis
- Class: Small family car (C)
- Body style: 5-door hatchback (440); 4-door saloon (460)
- Layout: Front-engine, front-wheel-drive
- Related: Volvo 480

Powertrain
- Engine: petrol: 1.6 L B16F I4; 1.7 L B18F I4; 1.7 L B18FT turbo I4; 1.8 L F3P I4; 2.0 L F3R I4; diesel: 1.9 L F8Q turbo I4
- Transmission: 5-speed manual; 4-speed automatic; CVT automatic

Dimensions
- Wheelbase: 2,503 mm (98.5 in)
- Length: 4,312 mm (169.8 in) (440, 1986–1994); 4,405 mm (173.4 in) (460, 1986–1994); 4,345 mm (171.1 in) (440, 1994–1996); 4,435 mm (174.6 in) (460, 1994–1996)
- Width: 1,686 mm (66.4 in)
- Height: 1,390 mm (54.7 in)
- Curb weight: 993–1,069 kg (2,189–2,357 lb)

Chronology
- Predecessor: Volvo 300 Series
- Successor: Volvo S40/V40

The Volvo 440 and 460 are versions of a small family car produced by the Swedish manufacturer Volvo between June 1988 and September 1996. The 440 was a five-door hatchback and the 460 a four-door saloon which followed in 1989. They were built at the NedCar factory in Born, the Netherlands and were only offered with front-wheel drive.

They shared many components with the earlier Volvo 480 coupé, including floorpan, front and rear suspension, engines from Renault, transmissions, and braking systems.

== Design and styling ==
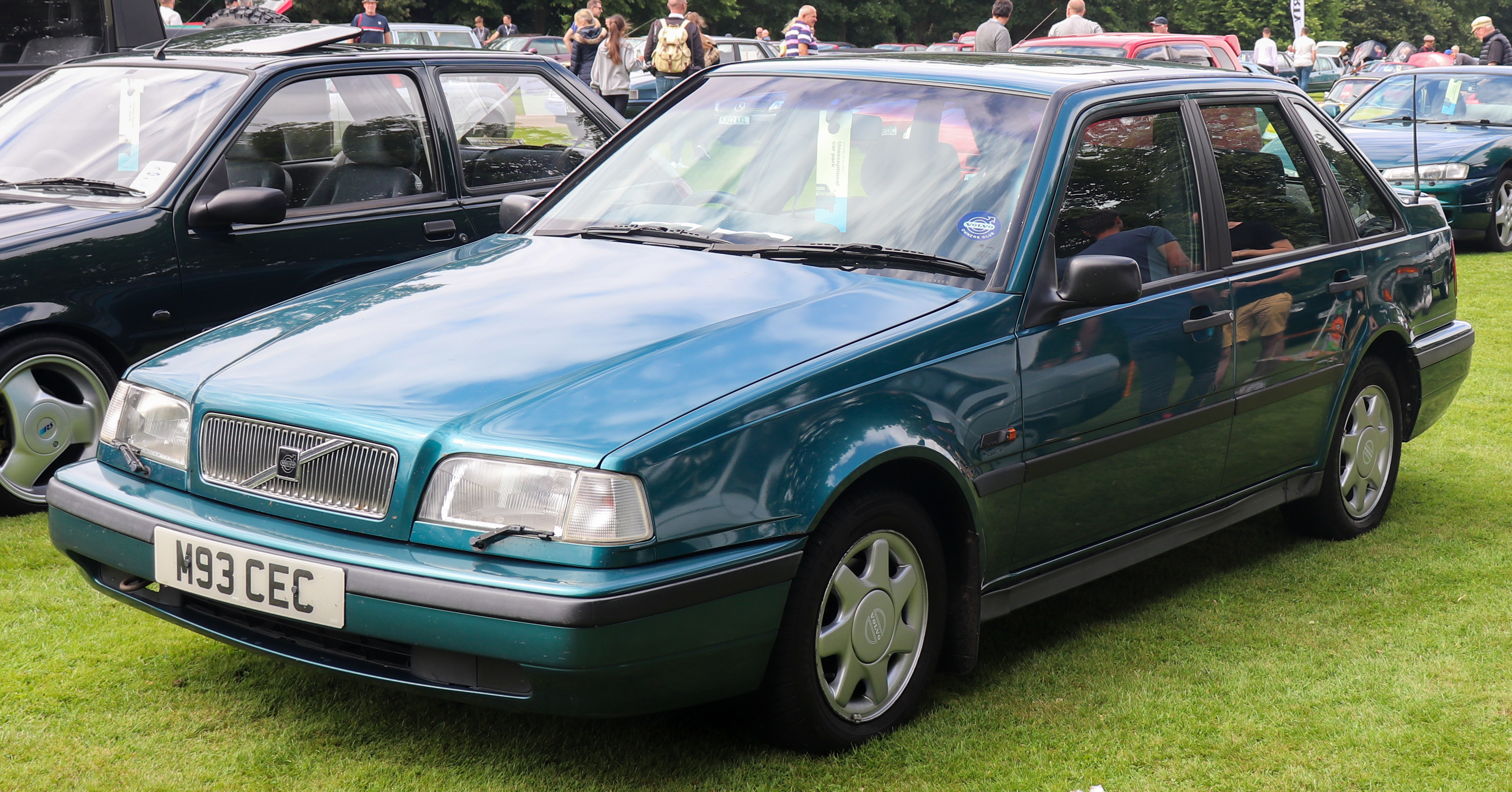
Volvo 440 SE (facelift)

The Volvo 440/460 Series models were designed to fit in below Volvo's bigger saloon and estate cars as a replacement to the 340/360 Series, to compete with the likes of the Alfa Romeo 33.

Development of the 440/460/480 started in 1978, as part of the "Galaxy Project" which was to create two lines of front-wheel drive cars to replace the 300- and 200-series. The smaller line was called G1, while the larger G2 was to become the new Volvo 850. The first G1 mule, designed by Jan Wilsgaard and called the G4, was completed in September 1980 and looked largely identical to the finished Volvo 440. The G1 project was split into three branches, the G13 becoming the 480, the G14 the 460, and the G15 the 440. In 1982, the entire project was sold by Volvo to Volvo Car B.V. in the Netherlands (the successor company to DAF), who started work on the 480 coupé version. As was Volvo's tradition, a new line of cars was always introduced with the most expensive and lowest selling model first, allowing Volvo time to iron out any problems before starting volume production.

The 480 had a lot of problems in its first year of production, and the Dutch office did not have the manpower to complete the G15 (440). A lot of the work was thus subcontracted to two English companies. With the project being shifted to the Netherlands, then partially shifted to England, and further held up by the troubled gestation and initial production of the 480, the 440 looked rather dated by the time it was introduced. While the actual design is credited to Peter van Kuilenburg, Gothenburg had laid down a lot of design provisions since this was to be a volume product for the company, and the final result looked near identical to Wilsgaard's 1980 design. A station wagon was never offered, to avoid competing directly with the larger 240 and 740 wagons. This did not stop independent suppliers ASC and Heuliez from designing station wagon models and presenting them to Volvo, while the Dutch company Toncar sold a bolt-on conversion which replaced the 440's tailgate with an add-on station wagon structure.

First generation 400 series cars resemble the bigger 940, whilst the facelifted example bore a resemblance to the Volvo 850 to increase sales. The interiors of the 400-series variants were designed by British Volvo designer Peter Horbury.

== Safety ==
Safety has always been an issue of primary importance to Volvo, who have developed many features since adopted widely throughout the car industry. Crumple zones were carried on from the previous 300 series into the design of 400 series cars. This aided by the addition of optional seatbelt pre-tensioners and airbags both for driver and front passenger in early 1991.

Other safety items included a high level brake light; a 'bulb blown' warning system; 'door open' warning light; a seatbelt reminder/warning light: all of which all came as standard on all models throughout the range.

Safety was further improved on models from 1993 onward with the introduction of Side Impact Protection System (or SIPS). This was virtually unheard of at the time, and was provided (again as standard) by the forerunner of the SIPS system used on all modern Volvo cars. United Kingdom models also included daytime running lights as standard, although these could be disabled by the dealer at the owner's request.

The original advertising campaign for the 400 range centred on occupant safety. A family of crash test dummies appeared to 'survive' intact after driving the car through a plate glass office window some storeys up. Various other scenarios simulating crashes were employed in addition, all of which ended with the family walking away relatively unharmed — only to be used again in further crash tests.

== Continuously Variable Transmission (CVT) option ==
At launch, Volvo decided to offer a four-speed ZF conventional style automatic transmission, even as they spent a few more years redesigning the DAF-derived constantly variable transmission (CVT) to work with engines with more torque than the ones used in the Volvo 340. The majority of automatic 440/460s thus had a conventional four-speed automatic.

The CVT transmission, as fitted to the last generation 440/460 Series, used steel belts (as opposed to the rubber belts used in the 300 Series) and was known as Transmatic, although cars equipped with this auto box were marketed HTA (short for High Tech Auto).

The Transmatic differs greatly in its construction, and apart from the basic CVT principle of belts running in expanding pulleys, it has nothing in common with the Variomatic CVT used in the earlier 300 Series.

Whilst the Variomatic system was completely exposed to the elements at the rear of the car and used dry rubber belts, Transmatic was mounted transversely in the front of the car, and featured steel belts running in oil within a sealed gearbox casing. Subsequent CVT transmissions (such as Audi's Multitronic), have continued to use this configuration.

The HTA gearbox was subsequently used in Rover's Metro redesigned model (last generation) and carries the VT-1 model component number.

== Standard specifications ==
The specifications of most models of 440 and 460 were relatively high when compared with similarly priced alternatives. The list of options included as 'standard' grew and changed regularly throughout the lifespan of the car, varying from country to country and later also differing according to trim level. Furthermore, various 'special editions' were also introduced with equipment differing from that found as standard on all other models; making any more general comparison difficult.

Heated front seats were found across the entire range, as was a five speed gearbox; adjustable seatbelt with pre tensioners; folding two thirds split rear seats; lockable glovebox with light; and boot and ashtray lights.

Options listed as standard on later models include anti-lock brakes (ABS); traction control; front fog lights; separate reading lights for passengers in the back (located in the rear grab handles and cleverly shielded from the driver's view); Radio/cassette player with six high fidelity Blaupunkt stereo speakers; tinted UV blocking windows; Map reading lights; Graduated sun visor; Self-supporting (propless) bonnet; rear window wash/wipe; lumbar support; electric windows/mirrors; heated wing mirrors; central locking; tachometer. The driver's console on all models housed an array of warning lights, a rheostat and a lambda sensor monitor.

There were two generations of 440/460: the facelift model replaced the original model in the autumn of 1993, for the 1994 model year. Changes included a new bonnet and nose, new rear light clusters, body coloured bumpers, a different grille and numerous new options of engine, spec. level and equipment. The changes made the cars resemble the very successful Volvo 850 model more closely.

== Engines ==
Both 440 and 460 had a 1.7 litre Renault engine at launch, carried over from the Volvo 300 Series; this was available between 1988 and 1992 in two different versions with a carburettor, 79 PS (58 kW; 78 hp) and 128 N⋅m (94 lb⋅ft) or 87 PS (64 kW; 86 hp) and 130 Nm, multipoint fuel injection in two different versions with either 95 PS (70 kW; 94 hp) and 140 N⋅m (103 lb⋅ft) or 106 PS (78 kW; 105 hp) and 140 N⋅m (103 lb⋅ft) in the early GLT models and with multipoint fuel injection and no catalytic converter. The simplest, carburetted version was not immediately available.

The standard, fuel injected and catalyzed 1,721 cc powerplant produced 102 PS (75 kW; 101 hp) and a claimed top speed of 185 km/h (115 mph), which was marginally superior to some of its contemporary counterparts, such as the Volkswagen Passat and the Opel Vectra, as their 1.8 litre engines only had 90 bhp. The turbocharged version offered 120 PS (88 kW; 118 hp), and a claimed top speed of 200 km/h (124 mph). This kind of performance put it on par with higher end 1.8 litre engines, or contemporary 2.0 litre engines, but at a significant cost increase. In August 1991, the lower cost 440/460 DL now became equipped with a somewhat larger, 1,794 cc with single-point fuel injection and 90 PS (66 kW; 89 hp). Thanks to the slight displacement increase, however, torque remained nearly identical.

From 1992, the engines offered were substantially different, with the range now including a 1.6i with 83 PS (61 kW; 82 hp) as well as the 1.8 from the DL and a 2.0i with 110 PS (81 kW; 108 hp). The naturally aspirated 1.7-litre was discontinued but the turbo option from the pre-facelift version remained unchanged. The 1.6 was equipped with multi point fuel injection; the 1.8 engine had single point injection, and the 2.0 came with a choice of single point and multi point injection units, the older 1.7 turbocharged version however had more power.

From 1994, the engines became slightly more powerful. Diesel versions also became available: a 1.9-litre Renault turbodiesel option with 90 PS (66 kW; 89 hp) was offered, badged as either TD or Turbo Diesel depending on which European market the car was sold in. Volvo also released a limited market 1.8 HTA, the "High Tech Auto", using a much improved electric belt assisted CVT auto transmission, but it was short lived and slow selling.

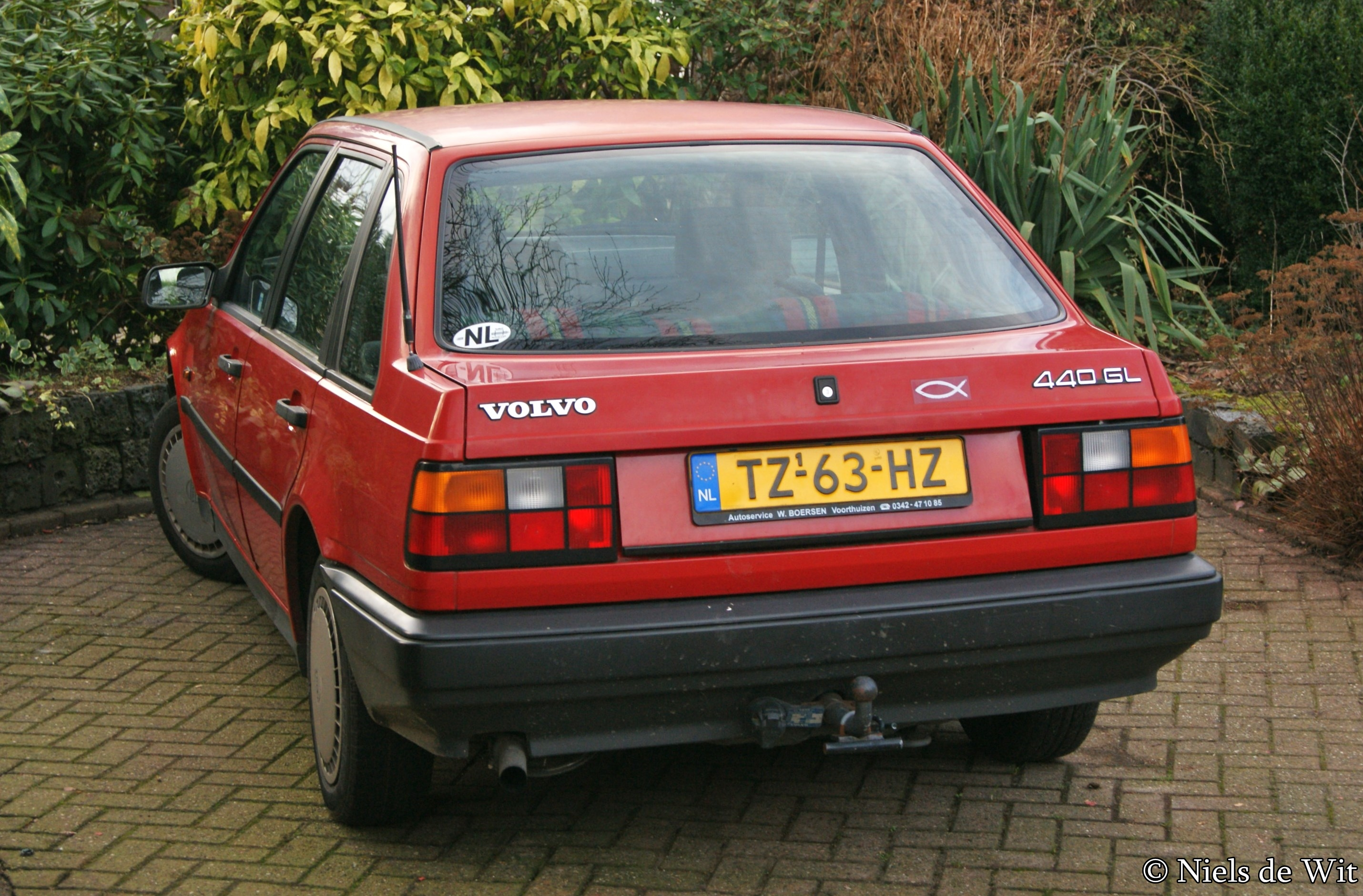
Pre facelift Volvo 440 GL (the Netherlands)

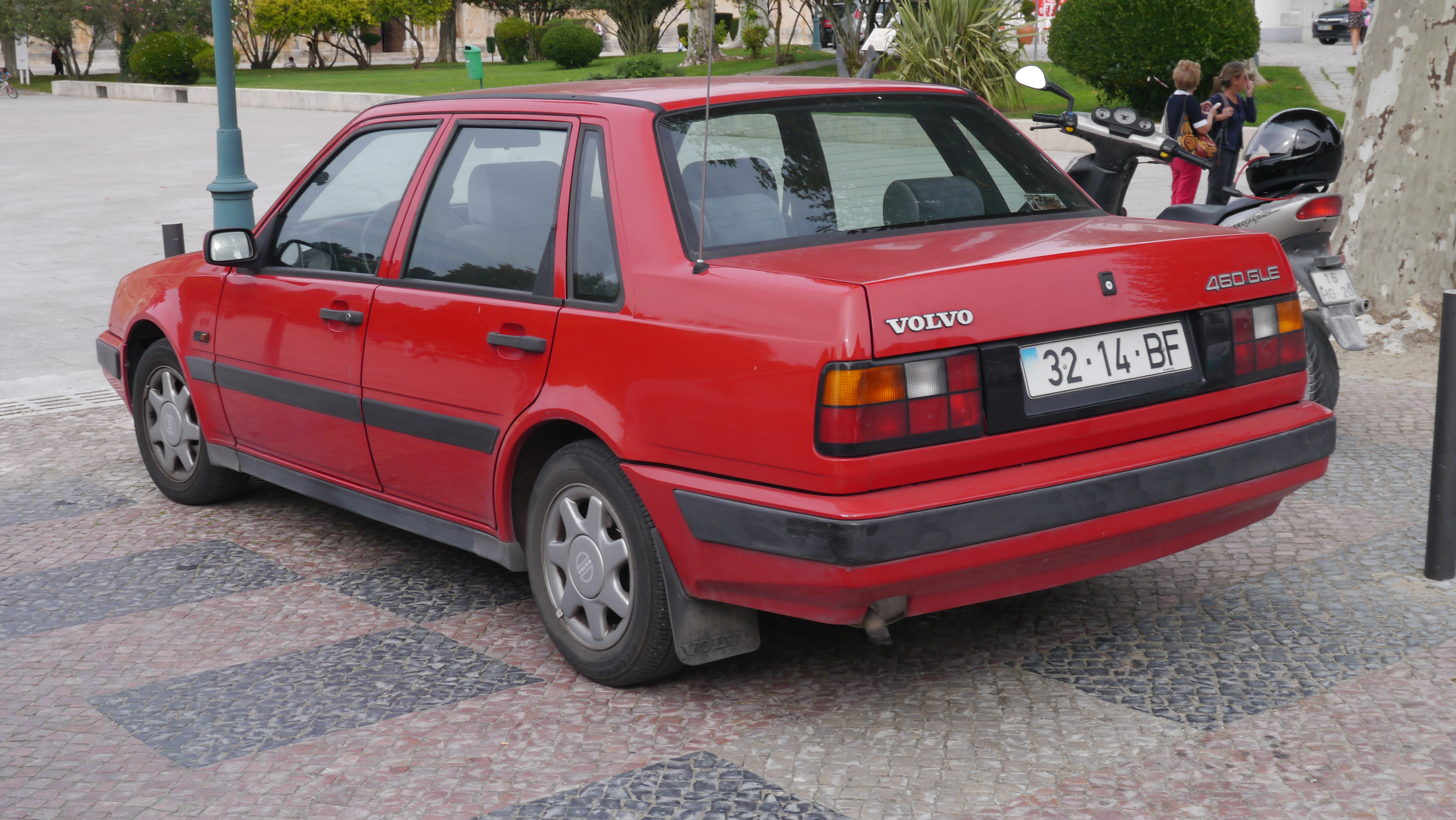
Pre-facelift Volvo 460 GLE (Portugal)

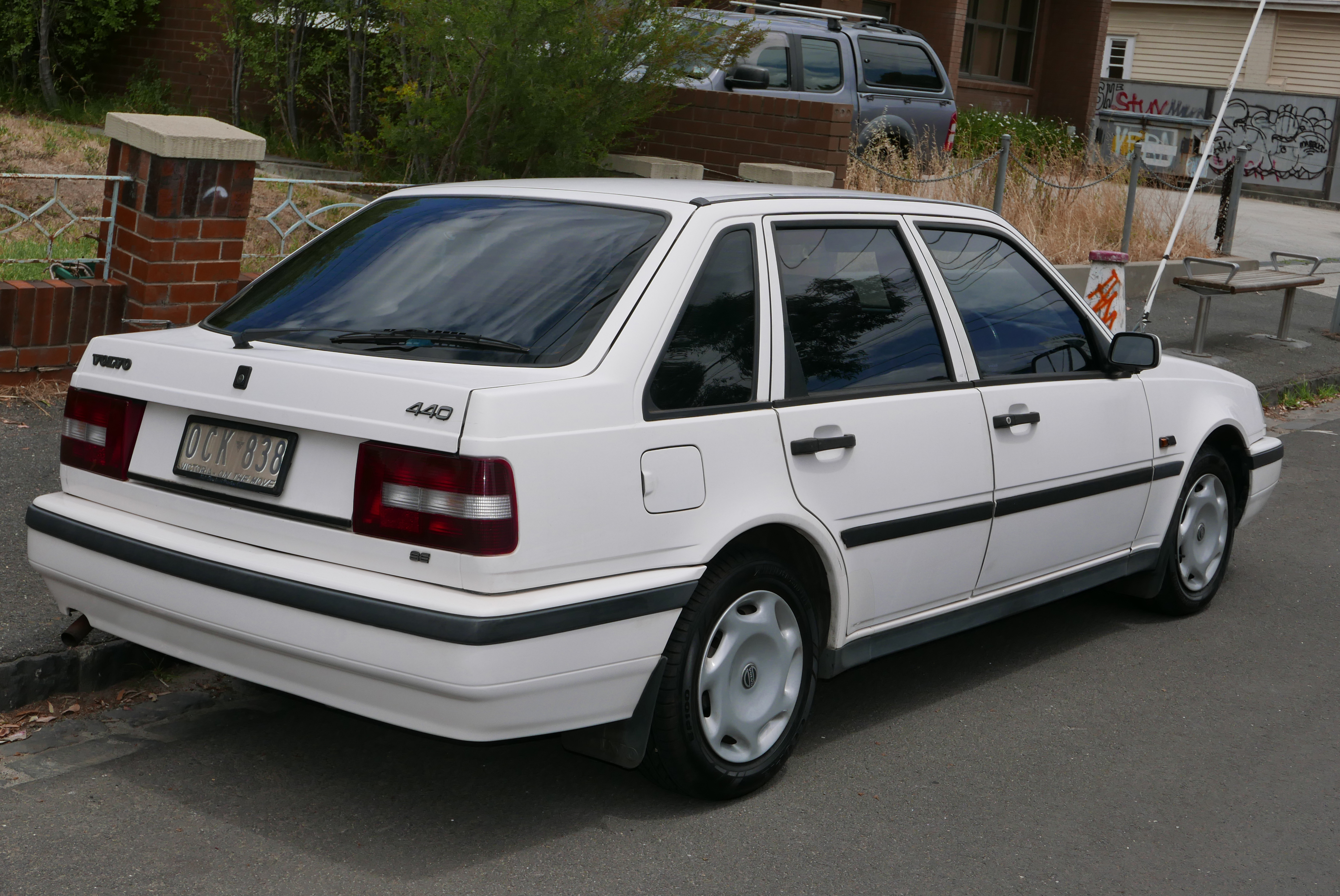
Facelift Volvo 440 SE (Australia)

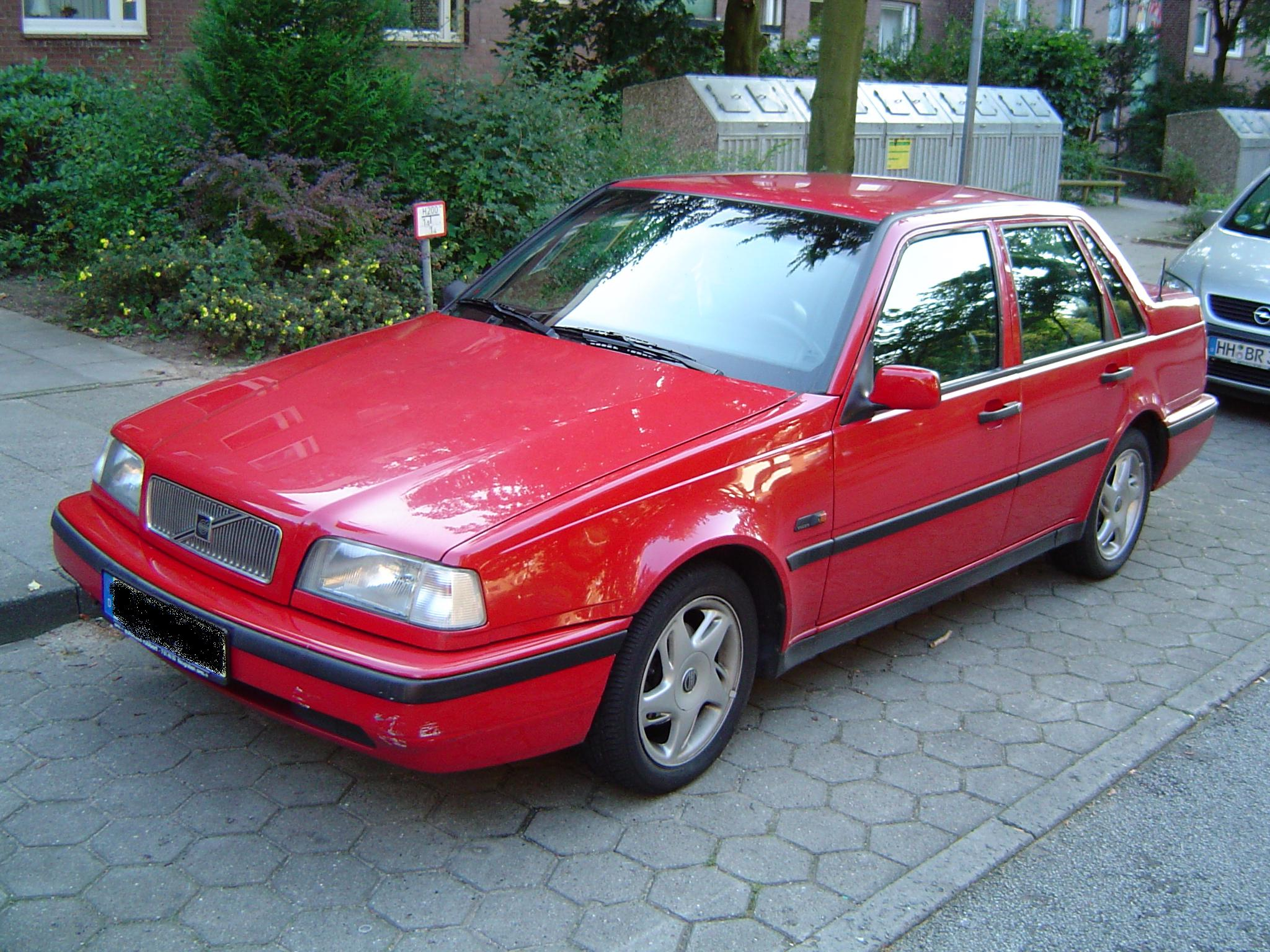
Facelift Volvo 460

== Trim levels ==
In the United Kingdom, equipment levels were different from mainland Europe. Early cars were available in L, GL, GLE, GLEi, GLT and Turbo trims. The L and GL trim levels were basic; GLE was plush and along with the GL model offered split rear seats compared to the fixed one piece rear bench on the L model; the GLT was a well equipped, mildly sporting trim level. GLT and Turbo were externally similar, both featuring lowered sports suspension and a large rear spoiler. Other trim levels were gradually phased in, such as limited edition Si and Xi, and Turbo later became simply an engine variant, rather than a full trim variant. In early 1991, the black plastic rear view mirrors were replaced by body colored ones.

From 1992, the range was the same for a year and a half. As a result of the facelift of 1994, the range altered drastically. Trim levels were now: base, S (which was intended as a "family" variant), Si (intended as a "sports" variant), SE ("business" variant), GLT ("performance" variant) and CD ("luxury" variant) trims. An Li model also appeared in 1994, offering base spec with the addition of power steering (and, on later models, a sunroof).

From at least 1995 onwards, all engine choices were available with all trim levels. The later Si models and all GLT models were easily distinguishable from the rest of the range, due to the additions of sports suspension (making the car ride visibly lower) and a large rear spoiler. The GLT's specification was, however, significantly higher in featuring part leather upholstery, alloy wheels, ABS, traction control and an uprated stereo system as standard equipment.

The SE was also slightly more distinguishable, having a small rear spoiler which it shared only with the limited edition ES pack model. The ES pack could be added to cars of any engine variant from late 1995. It featured sports suspension, 15" alloy wheels, metallic paint, door sill decals, electric front windows, electric heated mirrors, front and rear armrests, ABS and immobiliser in addition to the small spoiler and an uprated stereo unit.

The S model was also notable, having two foldout child booster seats integrated into the car's rear seat, a dustbin incorporated in the dashboard and rear headrests. However unlike all the 300 Series, the 440 had, at last split rear seats fitted, though only the basic models lacked a split.

Specification of all later cars was high, with many featuring air conditioning – particularly as a result of a special offer operated by Volvo in the United Kingdom in 1995, where £100 deleted the standard electric glass sunroof from the car's specification in favour of air conditioning and 15" alloy wheels, identical to those fitted to Volvo 850 CD models, albeit with lower-profile tyres.

The luxury CD trim came particularly well-specified especially on the later, facelifted cars, with features such as heated black leather seats, interior burr walnut fascia trim, Air-conditioning, electrically operated & heated door mirrors, remote central locking, electric windows (front and rear), electric aerial, premium Volvo RDS radio cassette, thick pile carpeting, alloy wheels as well as ABS. The CD trim level could be optioned with any engine with the exception of the 1.9 Turbo Diesel, where the GLT was the highest available trim line.

The line up was reduced (for example, the Si and GLT models were replaced by the GS, which had all of the Si's equipment and some of the GLT's, such as ABS) prior to production ceasing in late summer 1996, when the Volvo S40/V40, which shared its platform with the Mitsubishi Carisma, replaced the 440/460 Series.

=== Mainland Europe ===
In most European markets, the original trim levels consisted of GL, GLE, GLT, and Turbo. The lower cost DL model, while announced for some markets from the beginning, arrived a little bite later as the carburetted engine was not initially ready for sale. In some markets, such as Sweden, this model only arrived in August 1991 (for the 1992 model year).
