= Volvo 480 =

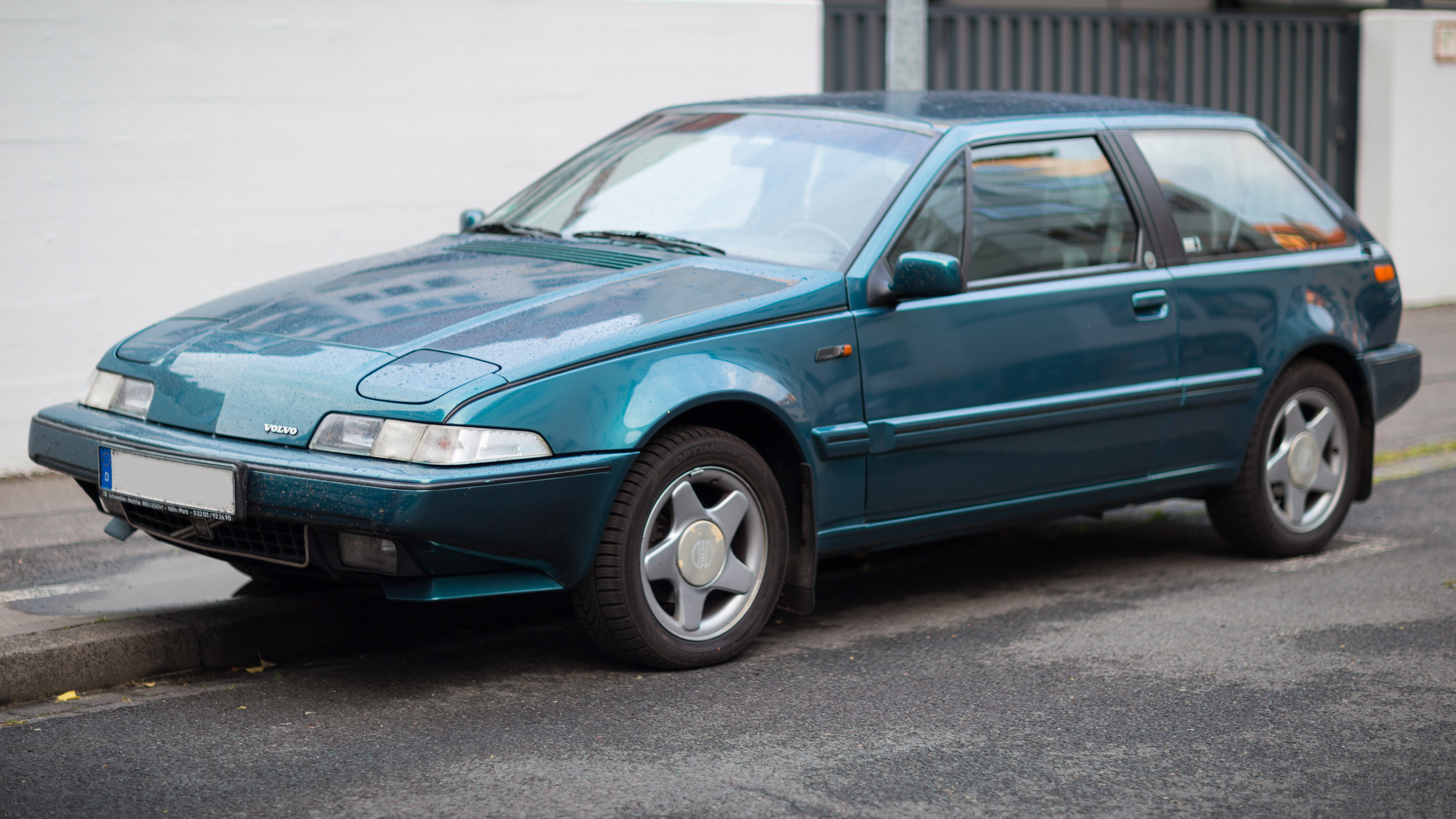

Overview
- Manufacturer: Volvo Cars
- Production: 1986–1995
- Assembly: Netherlands: Born (NedCar)
- Designer: John de Vries, Peter Horbury

Body and chassis
- Class: Compact car (C)
- Body style: Coupé
- Layout: FF layout
- Related: Volvo 440/460

Powertrain
- Engine: 1.7 L F3N I4; 1.7 L F3N turbo I4; 2.0 L F3R I4
- Transmission: 5-speed Renault JC5 manual 4-speed ZF 4HP14Q automatic

Dimensions
- Wheelbase: 2,503 mm (98.5 in)
- Length: 4,258 mm (167.6 in)
- Width: 1,710 mm (67.3 in)
- Height: 1,318 mm (51.9 in)
- Curb weight: 1,016–1,079 kg (2,240–2,379 lb)

Chronology
- Predecessor: Volvo P1800
- Successor: Volvo C30

The Volvo 480 is a sporty compact car that was produced in Born, Netherlands, by Volvo from 1986 to 1995. It was the first front-wheel drive car made by Volvo and the only Volvo featuring pop-up headlights. The 480 was available in only one body style on an automobile platform related to the Volvo 440/460 five-door hatchback and four-door saloon models.

It features an unusual four-seat, three-door hatchback body, somewhere between a liftback and an estate in form. The 480 was marketed as a coupé in Europe starting in 1986. The car was originally intended to be marketed in the United States as a 2+2 "sports wagon" in the fall of 1987, although these plans were cancelled in part due to the continued weakness of the U.S. dollar during 1987.

== Development ==
Volvo took six years from the time the 480 was conceived, through its development, and finally brought to production readiness. The press launch was on 15 October 1985. However, the 480 was first put on public show in March at the 1986 Geneva Motor Show, becoming available to mainland European buyers in May 1986 and the UK and Ireland on 11 June 1987. A total of 22,421 480s were eventually sold in the UK, the highest sales in any country.

Volvo described the car as a four-seater with "sporty styling" and the first front wheel driven Volvo. The press described it as having a "sleek hatch body" in contrast to Volvo's traditional "boxcar look". While the 480's design is often referred to as a shooting brake by commentators, Volvo themselves did not use the term. The 480 was the first Volvo of its style since the 1800ES, and the last until the unveiling of the C30. All of these models featured a frameless glass hatch for cargo access.

The 480 was produced in Born, Netherlands, at the factory that built DAF cars, including the DAF 66, based on the Volvo 66, and later, the Volvo 300 Series. The 480 was the forerunner of the Volvo 440 and 460 models, which were built on the same platform.

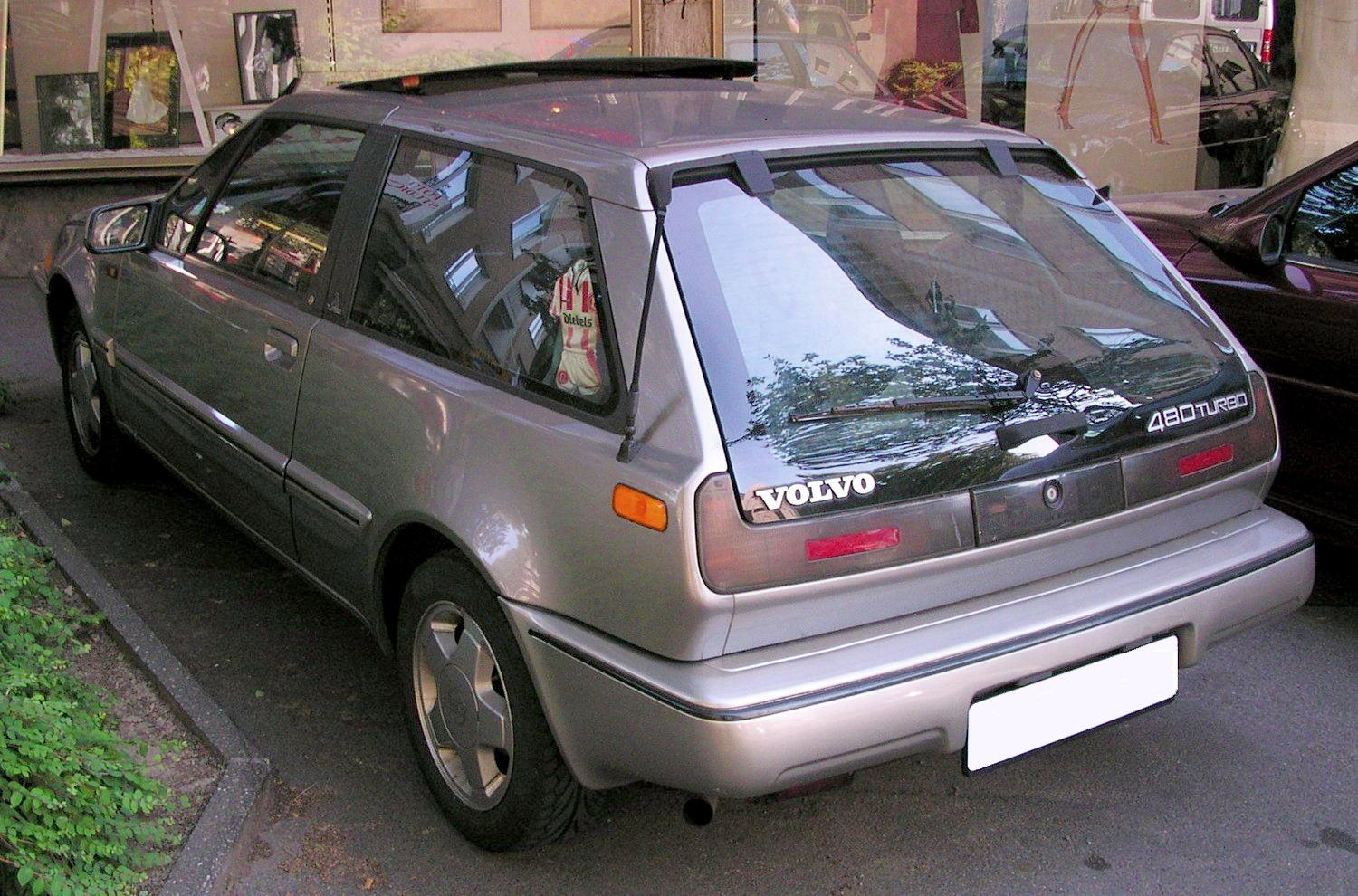
Rear end of a 480 Turbo

For weight-saving and pedestrian-safety reasons, certain panels, such as the nose-cone and bonnet, were made from composite materials. Volvo also claimed that it was one of the first cars sold in Europe featuring bumpers designed to comply with United States National Highway Traffic Safety Administration (NHTSA) regulations to withstand a 5-mile-per-hour (8 km/h) front rear impact without damage to the engine, lights, and safety equipment. The decision to incorporate pop-up headlights into the design was done to meet NHTSA standards on minimum headlight height while maintaining the aerodynamic shape. However, although it was foreseen to sell 25,000 cars overseas, the introduction of the Volvo 480 to the American market was postponed indefinitely in February 1988, citing unfavourable market conditions and the U.S. dollar exchange rate. The federalized engine, however, did allow Volvo to export the 480 Turbo to Japan in 1989 with some additional minor changes to the trim and side markers. The cleaned-up engine produced 115 hp (85 kW) at 5400 rpm and 175 N⋅m (129 lb⋅ft) at 4200 rpm. Of the 300 examples exported to Japan, 295 were left-hand drive with a manual gearbox, while the remaining five were right-hand drive automatics. To keep the width under the 1.7-metre threshold, allowing it to fit into the compact car tax class, Japanese-market cars have no trim strips on the bumpers and use the earlier, slimmer side trim pieces.

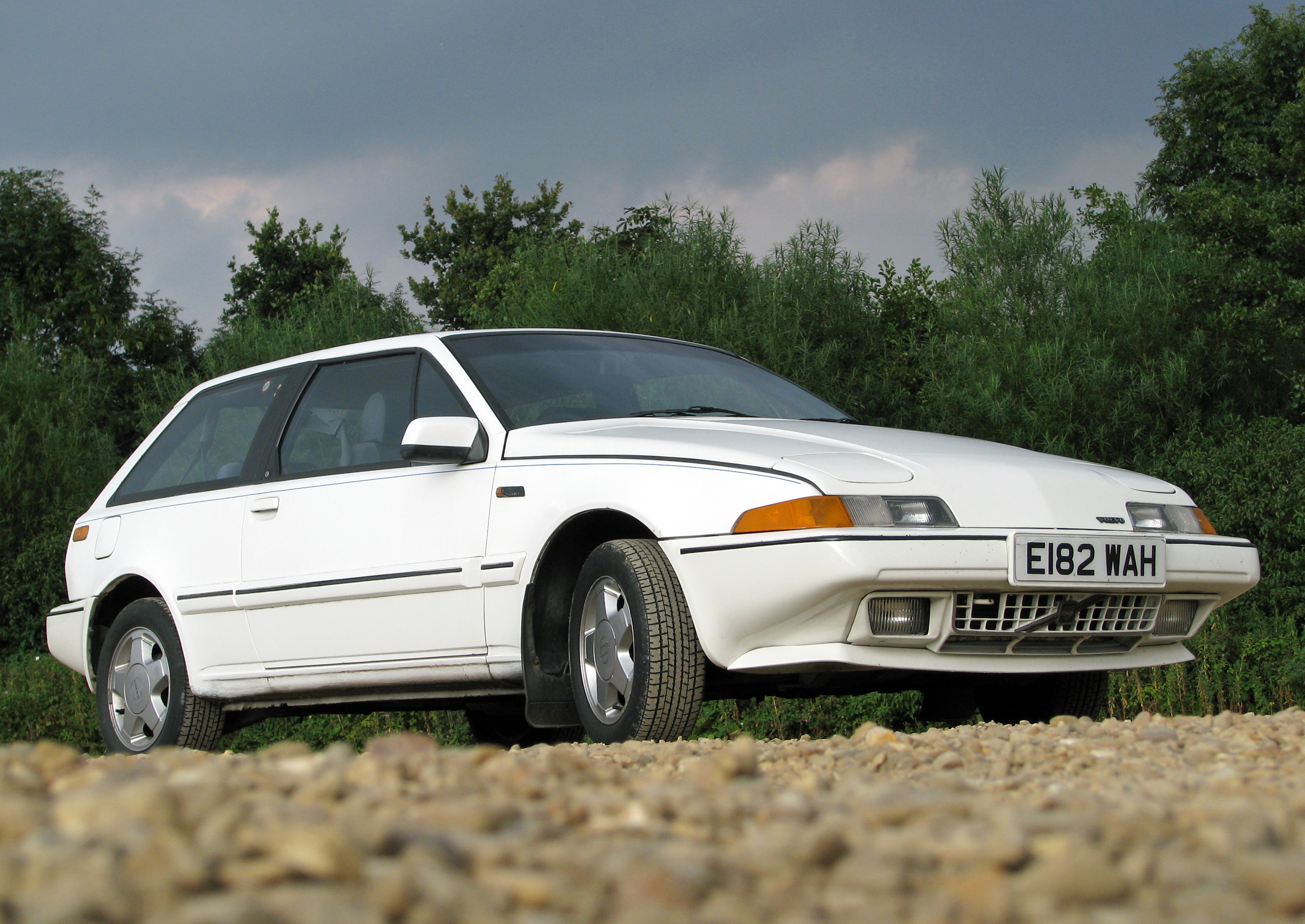
A 1988 1.7-litre 480ES with headlamps lowered

The concept was to market a modern, compact front-wheel drive car with a unique low-slung design targeting buyers "between 25 and 40, probably with a higher than average education and with a career." Designed by Volvo's Dutch subsidiary, the "sporty 480 ES coupé" was introduced to change the automaker's "frumpy image" and into the "yuppie" market segment.

Daytime running lights, an illuminated driver's door lock, follow-me-home headlights with 30-second delay and an automatic rear wiper in reverse gear were among the electronic features considered advanced for the time. A fully electronic 'Info Centre', which incorporated a fuel gauge and seven other measurements including estimated range, instant MPG, and average speed, was standard on most models.

Volvo highlighted that the car was "well-endowed with advanced electronics," and the press release described in detail the numerous features. The 480 had good handling, due in part to its Lotus-developed rear axle. The normally aspirated Renault engines, while not powerful, were reliable.

== Special editions ==
=== Limited Edition (Paris blue) ===
In 1991, Volvo offered a special edition. It featured turquoise bumpers and trim inserts, a unique interior with two-tone turquoise and grey leather upholstery, speckled multicoloured carpet, and a MOMO leather steering wheel with grey and turquoise strip. It also received a front chin spoiler, 14-inch Atlas 5-spoke alloy wheels, and was available from the factory with the naturally aspirated 1.7 catalysed engine. One car with 1.7 turbo engine was displayed at the 75th anniversary of the Paris Motor Show in 1992. This limited edition was discontinued following the release of the "Two-Tone" limited edition in 1992 and is commonly referred to as the "Paris Edition" by enthusiasts, while also being the rarest of the special editions.

=== Limited Edition (Two-Tone) ===
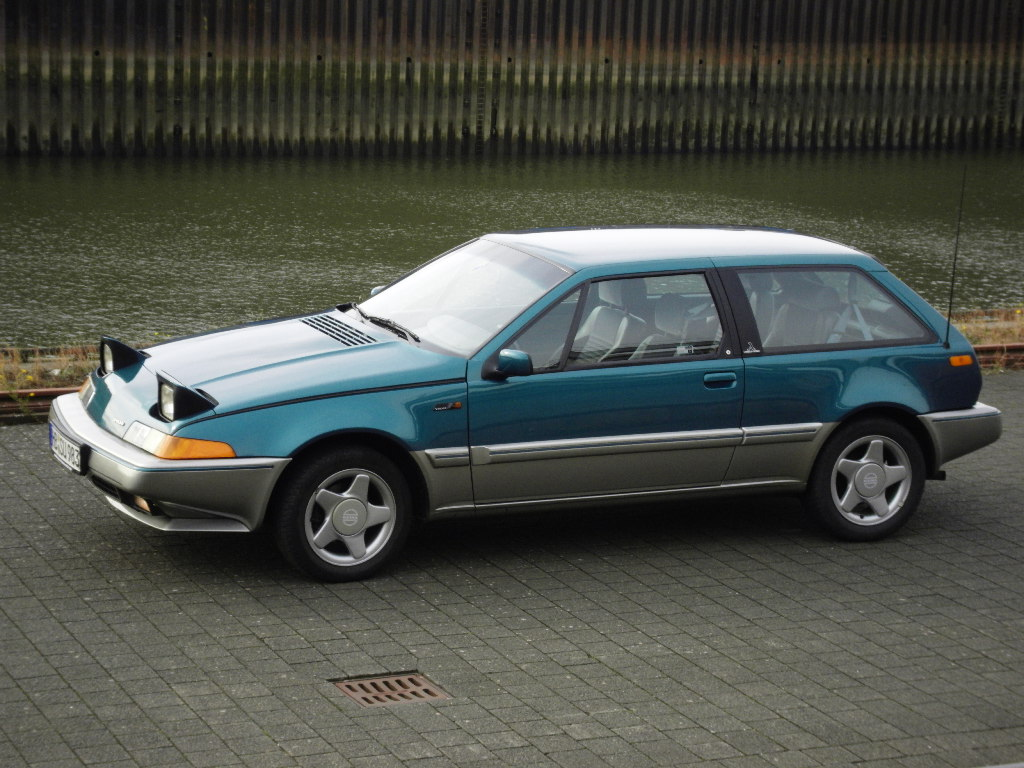
A Limited Edition featuring green and silver two-tone metallic paint

1992 saw the release of a second Limited Edition (commonly referred to as the "Two-Tone") featuring Peacock Green over Smoke Silver two-tone metallic paint scheme, leather steering wheel, and a split-vinyl and velour interior. The Two-Tone also featured a lower chin spoiler, 15-inch Taurus 5-spoke alloy wheels as standard until it was discontinued in 1993. Unlike the other special editions, the Two-Tone was available with all engine options and could be purchased as S, ES or Turbo spec (depending on the market). Like the 'Paris Blue' Limited Edition, the 'Two-Tone' Limited Edition was not limited to any specific production number.

=== GT ===
For the UK market on 1 June 1994, the GT was introduced and limited to 250 cars. It was available in two colours; Racing Green Metallic and Burgundy Pearl Metallic. The all-leather interior was designed by the German artist Wolf Cieciersci and featured a hand-painted red, green, and brown pattern, unique to each car and no two sets of seats were the same. The GT also featured air-conditioning as standard, 15-inch multi-spoke Vesa alloy wheels, and was only available with the 2.0 engine. The car retailed at £16,245.

A GT model was also sold outside of the UK; however, it was an option pack, not a standalone model and it did not feature the same interior or wheels as the UK models. Unlike the UK-market GTs, it could be optioned with a Turbo engine.

=== Celebration ===
May 1995 saw the United Kingdom release of the "Celebration" limited edition of 480 specially equipped and numbered cars. Celebrations were sold only in three colours, Dark Grey Metallic, Burgundy Metallic, and Satin White. A ruched leather interior, 15-inch 6-spoke Cetus alloy wheels, and air-conditioning (instead of a moonroof) were among the standard features on the Celebration. The Celebration was sold as the "Collection" in mainland Europe, and was limited to another 480 units.

== Technical Data ==
	1.7i			1.7i Turbo	2.0i
Model	ES		S, ES, LE	Turbo	S, ES, GT, LE, Celebration
Years	1986–1989		1989–1994	1987–1995	1992–1995
Engine code	B18E (F3N)	B18F (F3N)	B18EP (F3N)	B18FT/B18FTM (F3N)	B20F (F3R)
Engine Type, displacement	1.7 L (1,721 cc)				2.0 L (1,998 cc)
Engine Type, displacement	4-cylinder petrol engine with multi-point injection				
Engine Type, displacement	-	catalyzed		Turbocharged, catalyzed	catalyzed
Power output	109 hp (80 kW) at 5800 rpm	95 hp (70 kW) at 5400 rpm	102 hp (75 kW) at 5500–5600 rpm	120–122 hp (88–90 kW)	110 hp (81 kW) at 5400 rpm
Maximum torque	140 N⋅m (103 lb⋅ft) at 4000 rpm		142 N⋅m (105 lb⋅ft) at 3900 rpm	170–175 N⋅m (125–129 lb⋅ft) at 3300–4600 rpm	165 N⋅m (122 lb⋅ft) at 3500 rpm
Transmission	Renault JC5 gearbox or ZF 4HP14Q 4-speed automatic				
Transmission	Front-wheel drive				
Curbweight	1016 kg		1030 kg	1079 kg	1050 kg
Top speed†	190 km/h (118 mph)	180 km/h (112 mph)	185 km/h (115 mph)	200 km/h (124 mph)	191 km/h (119 mph)
Acceleration 0-100 km/h (62 mph)	9.5 s	10.8 s	10.5 s	8.9 s	9.3 s

†Volvo's figures vary considerably over the years

== Annual changes ==
- 1987 - Anti-locking braking system (ABS) becomes available as an optional extra.
- 1988 - The Turbo version was introduced, the Garrett AiResearch turbocharger increasing the power from 109 to 120 PS (80 to 88 kW; 108 to 118 hp). Maximum torque was 175 N⋅m (129 lb⋅ft) compared to the 140 N⋅m (103 lb⋅ft) for the naturally aspirated 1.7 engine. All Turbo models featured ABS as standard. Leather upholstery and moonroof both available as options.
- 1991 - The 480 received new mirrors, headrests for the back seats, as well as subtle modifications to the trim and body-coloured bumpers now standard for the ES models. That same year, upcoming EU Euro 1 emissions legislation meant that catalytic converters were fitted to all models except for certain export markets. The fuel tank size was also increased from 48 litres to 60 litres. At this time, the power of the uncatalyzed versions changed to 106 hp (78 kW) for the naturally aspirated B18 engine and 122 hp (90 kW) for the Turbo.
- 1992 - The introduction of a new trim level called the 'S'. This trim served as the entry model and lacked certain features as standard that were found on the higher spec 'ES' models, such as alloy wheels, front fog lamps, electric moonroof and the digital info centre. Also introduced was a total closure system whereby the key can be held in the lock position to close the windows and (where fitted) the moonroof. Initially, the 'S' came with unpainted bumpers as standard.

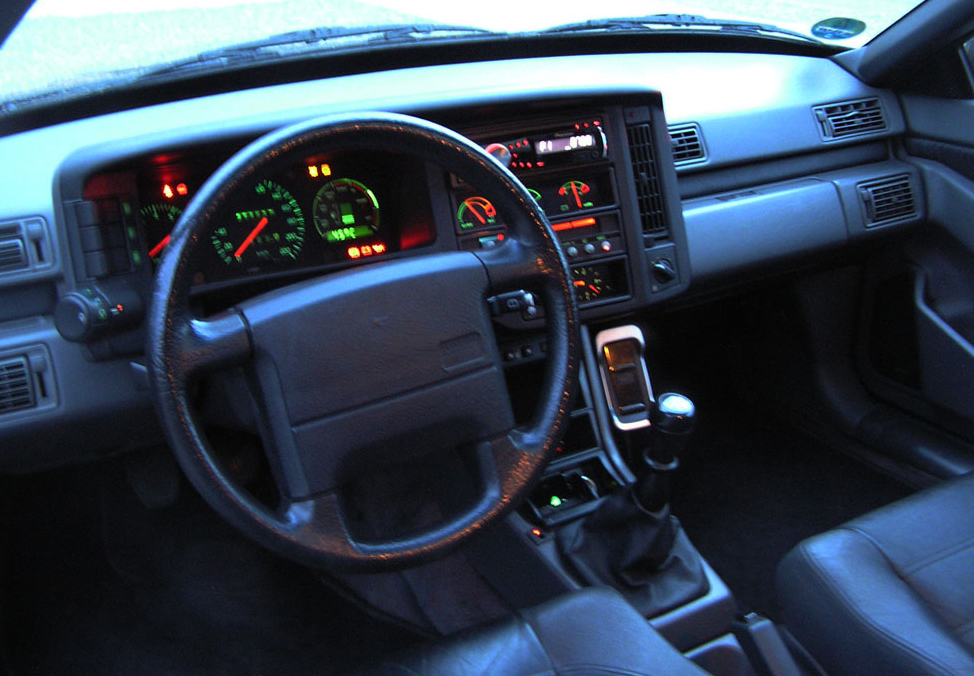
Volvo 480 interior with driver's airbag, optional leather upholstery and air-conditioning

- 1993 - Due to the lack of torque on the naturally aspirated 1.7, partly a result of power sapping emission controls, a larger 2.0 engine was introduced, also based on the same Renault F-Type engine architecture. It first became available for the 1993 model year, and the same ZF four-speed automatic transmission was also offered.
- 1994 - The 480 also received its last significant update, and now sported clear front turn signals, a third side intrusion bar in both doors, and a driver's airbag as standard. The standard grey velour upholstery was replaced with black half-leather. Full leather upholstery, however, remained a factory option.
- 1995 - There were no significant changes to the car in its final year. Celebration/Collection editions sold each with a run of 480 units to mark the end of production. Production ended on 7 September 1995, with 76,375 Volvo 480s made between over a 9-year period. The last 480 produced, a Storm Grey 2.0 ES, resides in the Volvo Museum in Gothenburg, Sweden.

Earlier CEM modules featured a "passing" function for the wipers, whereby fully depressing the accelerator pedal will switch intermittent wipers to full. All 480s featured automatic rear windscreen wiper when selecting reverse gear.

== Legacy and contemporary reviews ==
Following its release, the 480 was generally praised among the motoring press, both for its driving characteristics and comfort features, with motoring magazine What Car? declaring it the overall winner in a comparison with the Honda Accord Aerodeck in a 1987 twin-test. Motor Sport magazine commented on the sporty, but "obedient" handling, with "minimal understeer" and a stable chassis during cross-winds. Despite this, poor build quality and reliability at launch led to one Dutch car magazine to dub it the "coupe from hell".

Writing about the demise of the 480 in Car Magazine, journalist Richard Bremner wrote about the car's decent power and low weight combination. "This meant there was some danger of a sporty steer — pretty radical from a company that considered having fun at the wheel as acceptable as seducing a nun," he commented. "Good grief, a Volvo worth preserving. And there aren't many of them."

He also commented on the last versions for the United Kingdom as, "And Celebration it was too, as Europe waved goodbye to the badly built, pointless, DAF coupé with an outrageous asking price of £16,500. That paid for the CD player, alloys, leather, and a "pointless hallmarked plaque" glued to the dashboard." It "was no sports car" with most being "ridiculously underpowered" and available to collectors "at rock bottom" prices.

== Prototypes ==
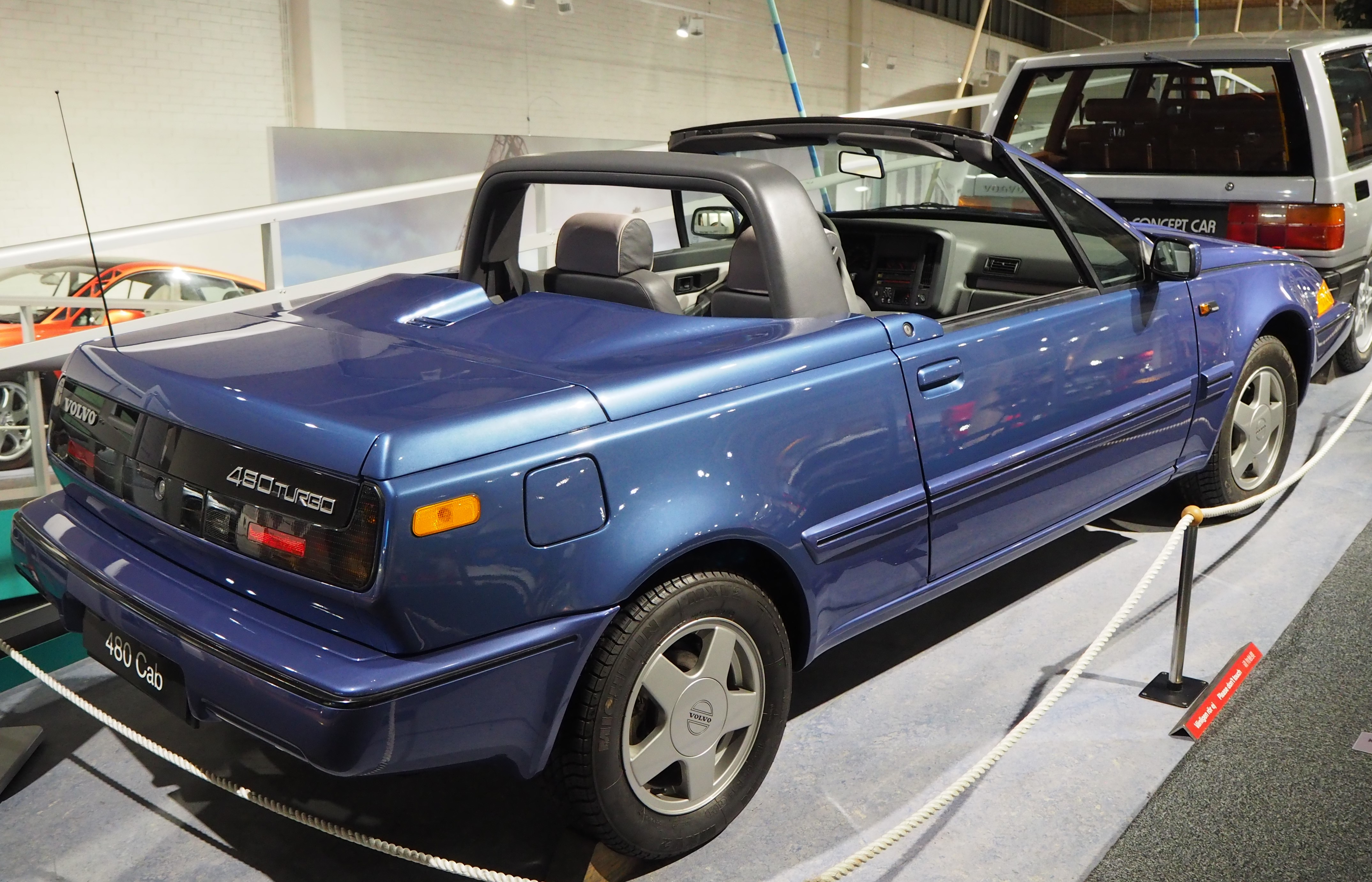
A Volvo 480 Cabriolet prototype in the Volvo Museum

The 480 factory also made several prototypes, including a supercharged version (G-Lader), a version with a sixteen-valve engine, and a version with a turbocharged 2.0 L engine.

A one-off electric prototype was produced in 1986 and had a claimed range of 120 km on a full charge. Its 15.6kWh nickel cadmium battery & separately magnetised DC motor produced 42 hp and 0-30 mph took around 9 seconds. The car could be recharged using a domestic plug socket located underneath the front number plate, and could seat two people, with the 300 kg battery replacing the rear seats. The spare wheel was relocated from the boot to the engine bay, with the electric motor taking the place of the standard petrol engine. This was purely a technical exercise, with Volvo having no intention on bringing it to market.

A convertible was announced to the press in the summer of 1987, but not seen in public until the 1990 Geneva Motor Show. It was planned to be launched at the beginning of 1991, but did not make production after a supplier declared bankruptcy, and concerns over rollover safety protection. Several convertible prototypes survive, as well as numerous aftermarket conversions. A Targa top was also proposed by the American Sunroof Company based in Detroit, but never made it past the prototype stage.
