= Volvo 300 Series =

Rear-wheel-drive small family car

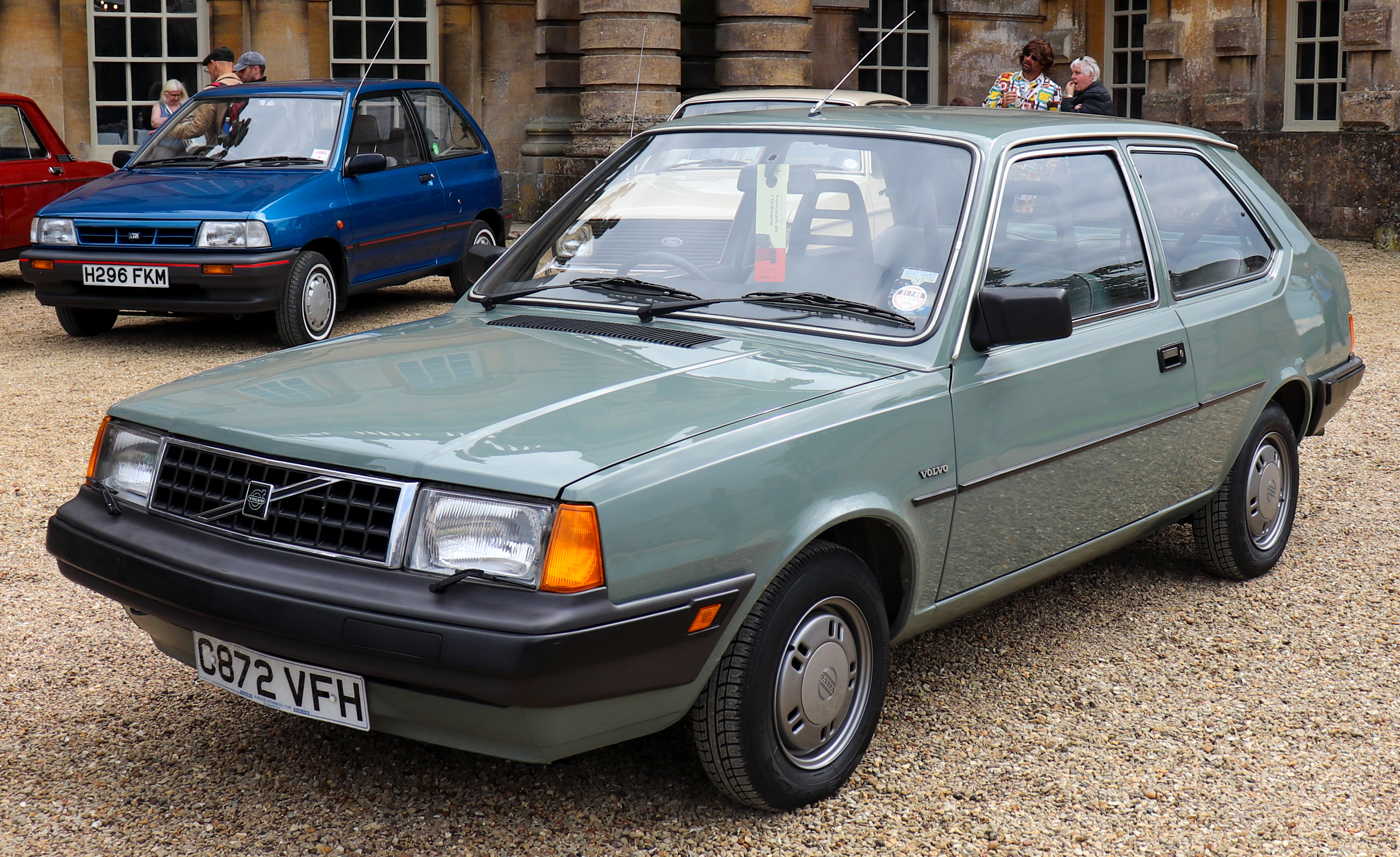
- 1986 Volvo 340 DL

Overview
- Manufacturer: Volvo Cars
- Production: February 1976 – March 1991
- Assembly: Netherlands: Born (Volvo Car B.V.); Malaysia: Shah Alam (Swedish Motor Assemblies, CKD); Indonesia: North Jakarta (PT. ISMAC)
- Designer: John de Vries

Body and chassis
- Class: Compact car / Small family car (C)
- Body style: 3/5-door hatchback; 4-door saloon
- Layout: FR layout

Powertrain
- Engine: 1289 cc B13 OHV I4; 1397 cc B14 OHV I4; 1721 cc B172 SOHC I4; 1986 cc B19/B200 SOHC I4; 1596 cc D16 diesel I4
- Transmission: 4-speed Volvo M45 R manual; 5-speed Volvo M47 R manual; CVT

Dimensions
- Curb weight: 3-door: 959–1,092 kg (2,114–2,407 lb); 4-door: 978–1,097 kg (2,156–2,418 lb); 5-door: 985–1,113 kg (2,172–2,454 lb)

Chronology
- Predecessor: none
- Successor: Volvo 400 Series

The Volvo 300 Series is a rear-wheel-drive small family car sold from 1976 through 1991, both as a hatchback and (from 1984) as a conventional notchback saloon.

It was launched in the Netherlands shortly after Volvo acquired a significant stake in the passenger car division of DAF in 1973. The series consisted of the Volvo 340 (previously 343/345) and the later Volvo 360.

== Background ==
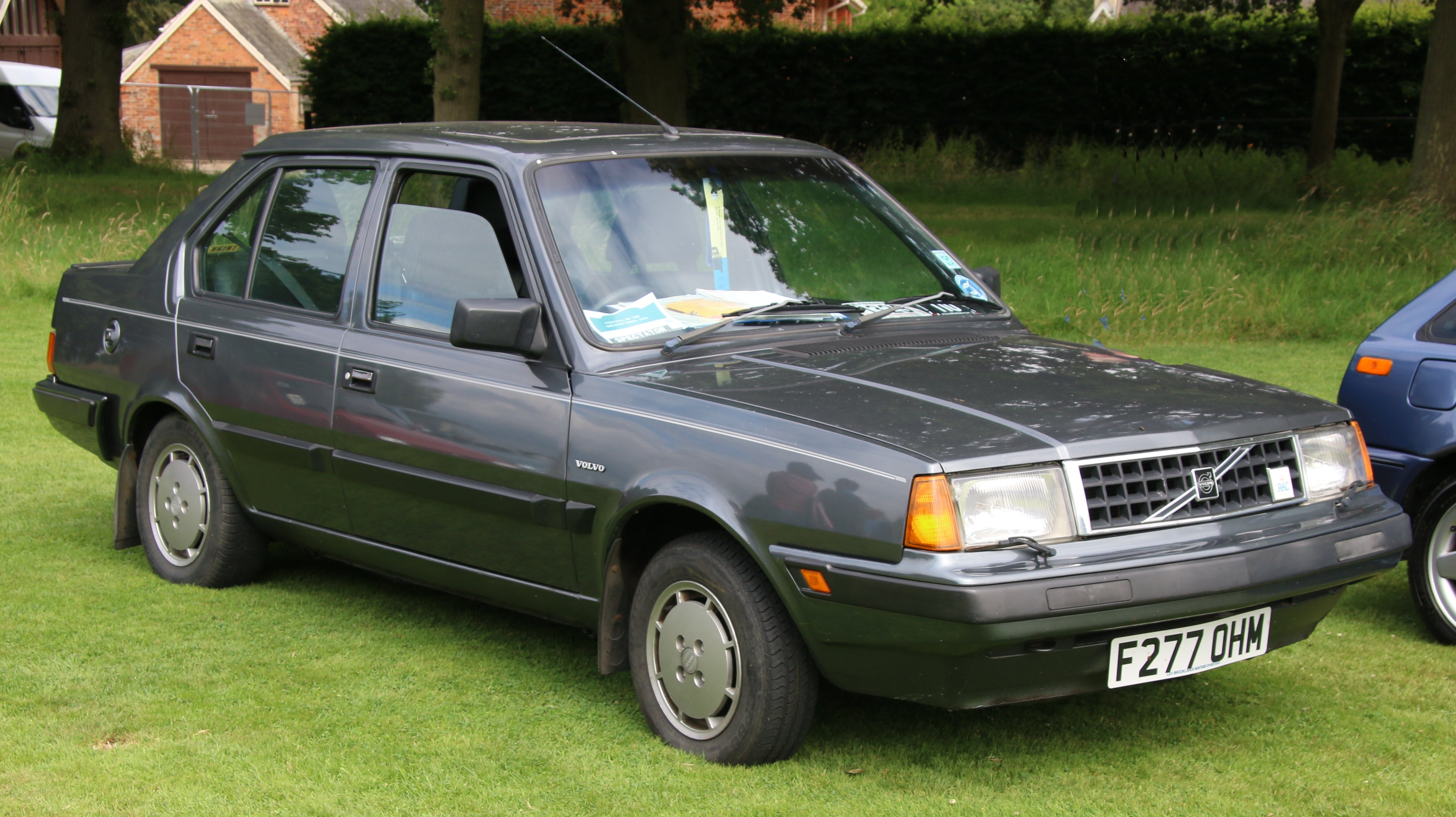
Volvo 340 notchback saloon

After building a series of compact cars, DAF sought a partner to bring its new, larger model, codenamed P900, intended to become the DAF 77, to market in 1970. Several manufacturers were approached, including Audi, BMW, and Volvo.

Due to the cost, Volvo was not initially interested, but DAF's access to Renault engines later persuaded the automaker. This arrangement helped Volvo expand its model lineup without the enormous expenditures of developing a new model. Building cars in the Netherlands also helped the Swedish Volvo to access the markets of the European Community, of which Sweden was not yet a member, and it was also because it was not economically viable for Volvo to build a compact model sold at a lower price point in its Swedish plants with the high cost of labour.

Volvo purchased a one-third share in DAF in 1973, increasing to a three-quarters stake in 1975; the DAF company's name was changed to Volvo Car BV that year. Free of its passenger car division, the commercial vehicle division, DAF Trucks, has continued to operate under the ownership of Paccar since 1996.

== Design ==
DAF began developing a new car design in 1970 as Project P900, initially intended as a replacement for the DAF 66 and due to launch in 1975, probably as the DAF 77. In 1971, four designs were presented anonymously to DAF employees: one by Bertone, one by Michelotti, and two by DAF in-house designers. The design by DAF's designer, John de Vries (who would later win a similar contest for the Volvo 480 design), was chosen. In 1972, Volvo bought a stake in DAF, followed by a takeover in 1975, and the design was gradually adapted to Volvo's standards, though there were a lot of quality concerns.

The 300 series was unusual in having the gearbox mounted to the De Dion tube rear axle as a transaxle, with the 2 L models having the driveshaft enclosed in a "torque tube". The rear-mounted gearbox helped with weight distribution, but resulted in a large transmission tunnel, especially compared with contemporary front-wheel-drive competitors, such as the Mk III Ford Escort and the Opel Kadett E/Mk. II Vauxhall Astra.

Overall, the 300 series was considered heavy and often underpowered, but reliable and safe by the standards of its day. However, the 360 GLT versions were well regarded by more enthusiastic drivers, with the gearbox location ensuring good weight distribution, balance, and traction. The fuel tank was located ahead of the rear axle, straddling the rear-mounted transmission, the safest possible location and one that ensured consistent handling characteristics whether the tank is full or empty.

== Model chronology ==
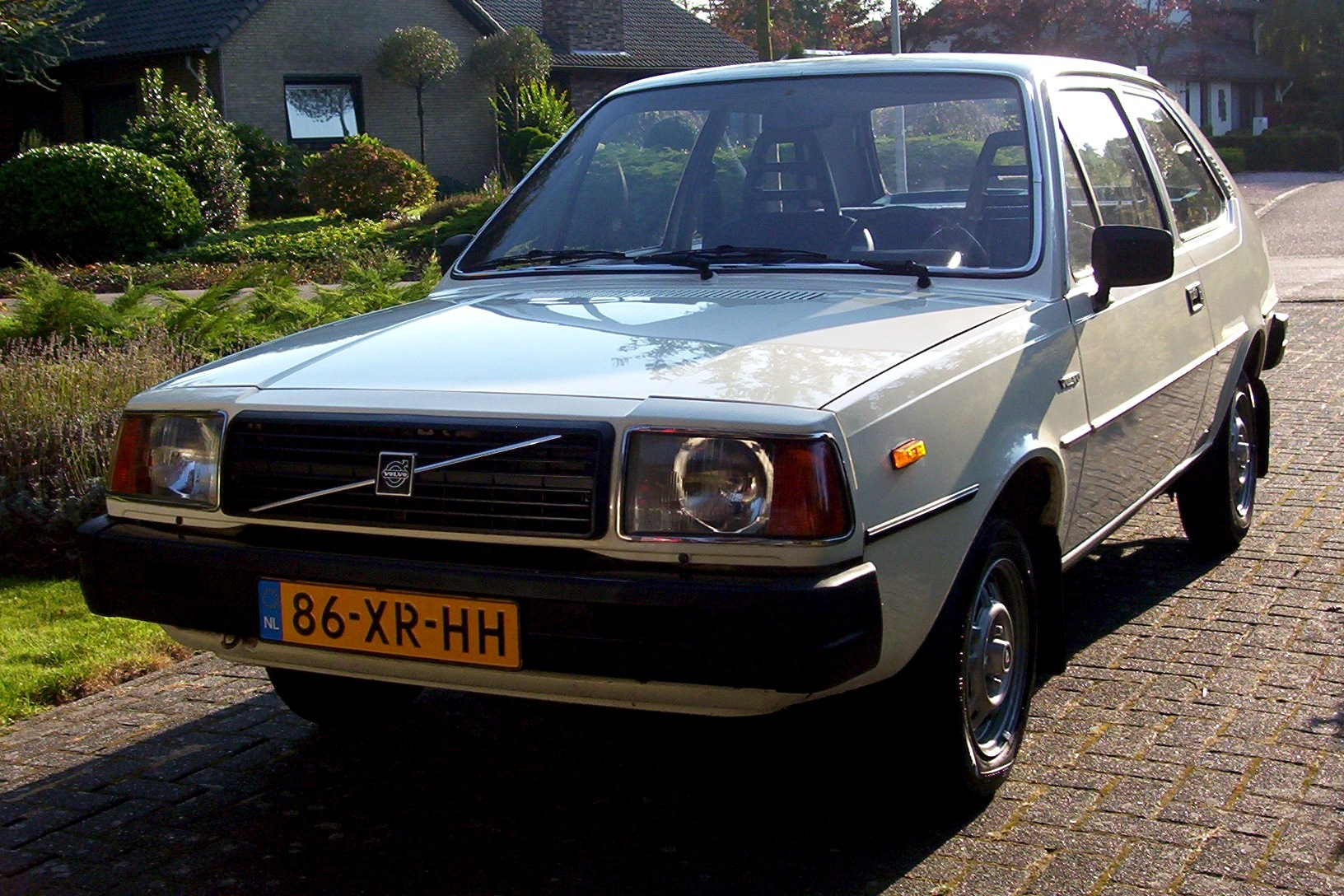
343 DL, 1980 model (before first bumper and front facelift)

The Volvo 343 was introduced on 19 February 1976. The introduction model was fitted with a 70 PS (51 kW; 69 hp) 1.4-litre Renault Cléon-Fonte engine in the front and DAF's radical Variomatic continuously variable transmission, unusually mounted in the rear, helping weight distribution. The engine was an enlarged version of those fitted to the DAF 55 and 66. To enhance the car's appeal and boost sales, Volvo adapted the M45 manual transmission from the 200 series to fit in place of the CVT, and sold the manual version alongside the CVT models from 1979. Volvo also redesigned the interior with a higher-quality dashboard, new seats, steering wheels, and various features derived from the larger 200 Series model. These addressed the criticism of the DAF-designed interior of the early cars. A five-door model, the 345, was added in August 1979 for the 1980 model year. The extra doors added 30 kg (66 lb); other modifications included better brakes, a slightly larger track due to wider wheels, and interval wipers. During 1980, larger wrap-around bumpers were introduced. In 1981, another engine option was added to the range, the Volvo-designed B19, which was only available in the GLS model with a manual transmission.

A facelift in summer 1981 for the 1982 model year featured a revised bonnet, grille, front lamp arrangement, and slightly different bumpers. The interior was revised, and the cars received a new dashboard more aligned with other Volvo models. Overall length was increased to 4,300 mm (169 in).

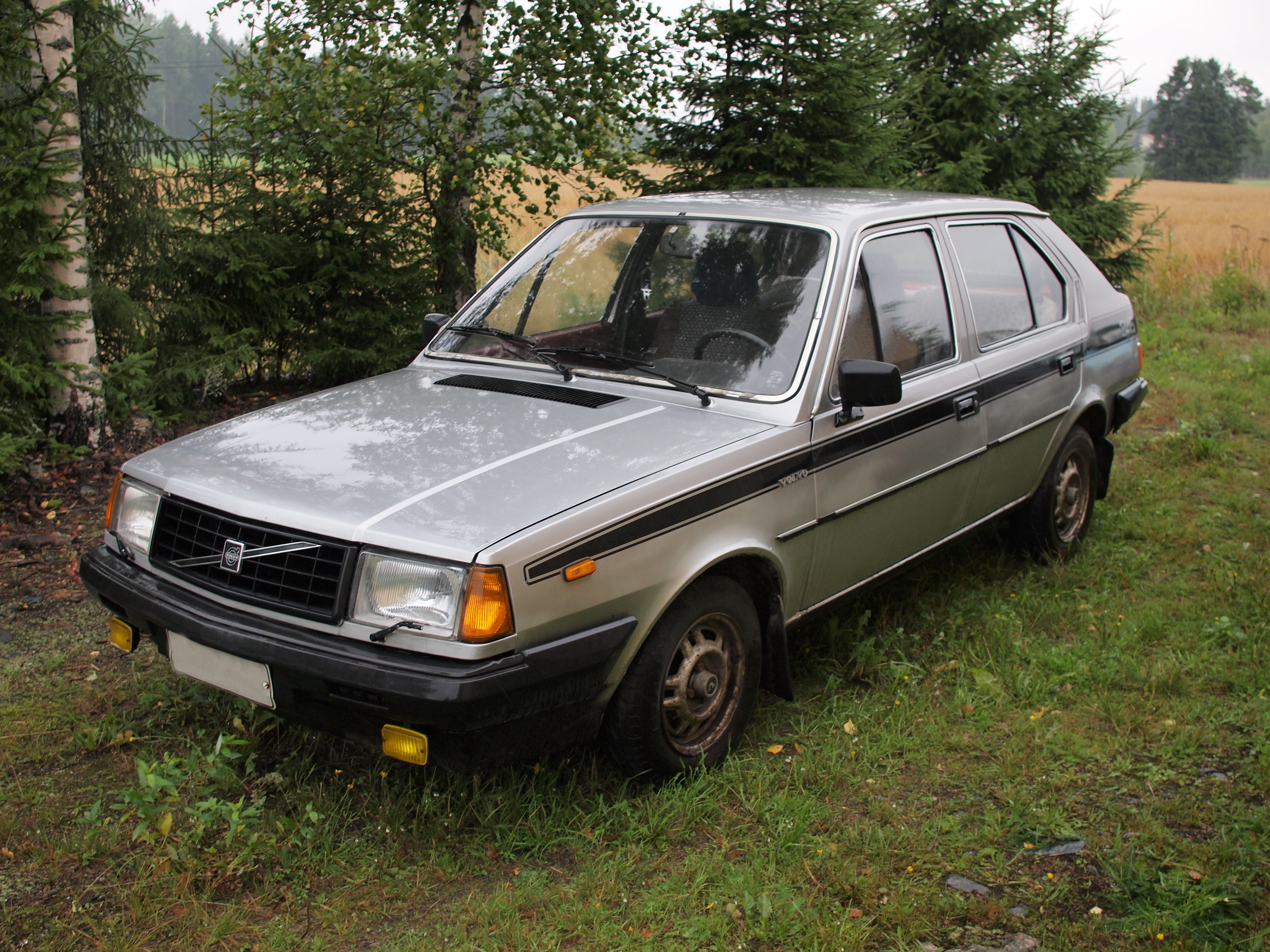
Volvo 345 DL, the five-door version, 1982 model

The third digit designating the number of doors was dropped from model designations starting with the 1983 model year. The rear seat also gained a little more space thanks to a shallower seat pad and a flatter plate beneath it. The more powerful 360 arrived that year with two 2.0 L engine choices, Volvo's 95 PS (70 kW) B19A (360 GLS) and the fuel-injected 115 PS (85 kW) B19E. The B19A was also available in the 340 DL. The more powerful 360 GLT was only available with a five-speed manual transmission and the engine was equipped with a breakerless ignition system. The interior featured velour upholstery and other enhancements as well as a front spoiler with integrated extra lights and a rear spoiler. This model was also 1.5 cm (1 in) lower. The "360" name was used to "give the new model a stronger profile in the Volvo range." This 2.0 L 360 model was available in five-door and three-door hatchback form, with four-door "notchback" saloon models added in 1984. Trim levels were GL, GLE, or GLT, depending on engine output and standard equipment.

In 1985, the 300 Series received another facelift. Changes included wraparound bumpers (optionally body-coloured) with integrated turn-signal lights. The taillights were also redesigned. Instrumentation changed from Smiths units to VDO. The older Volvo "redblock" engines in the 360 were upgraded to the low-friction B200 unit. Capacities and outputs remained much the same. The carburetor version was designated B200K, and the Bosch LE-Jet fuel-injected versions were named B200E.

An advertisement for the 300 series in the late 1980s saw a crash test dummy "come alive" and drive a 340 out of a second-floor factory window, nosediving into the concrete pavement.

From 1987 on, incremental improvements in features and emissions control were made. The newly designed power steering from the new Volvo 480 became available as an option for the 1988 model year, while rust protection was improved with the increased use of galvanised steel. Production of the 360 came to an end in 1990, while the 340 was discontinued in 1991, despite the fact it had supposedly been replaced by the Volvo 440 in 1987. The last car of the Volvo 300 series (a white Volvo 340) rolled off the production line on 13 March 1991, three years after the launch of the 400 series.

== Engines ==
The 300 Series had a choice of three petrol engines: 1.4, 1.7, and 2.0 L. The 1.4 L B14 was a 72 PS (53 kW; 71 hp) Renault C-series OHV pushrod unit, and for the 360 there was the B200 (originally the earlier B19 version) 2.0 L engine taken from the Volvo 240 with outputs varying from 95 to 118 bhp (71 to 88 kW). A new Renault F-series 82 PS (60 kW; 81 hp) 1.7 L petrol engine (designated the B172) was introduced in the 340 during the summer of 1985. This followed the range facelift, along with a 340 version of the saloon, which was only available with the new engine. There was also a catalyzed version (B172K) available later on, with 75 PS (55 kW; 74 hp).

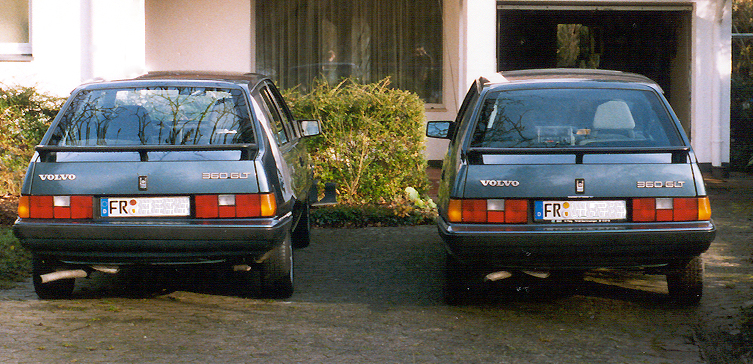
Volvo 360 GLT 1987 and 1988

A diesel engine for the 340, developing 54 PS (40 kW), was only available in select export markets and was added to the 340 models in 1984. This diesel was a Renault F-series (like the petrol 1.7), and was available with a 1.6 L naturally aspirated engine only - called the "D16" in Volvo's internal terminology. While these diesel models were never offered in the UK, they were marketed with right-hand drive in Ireland. In 1985, a 360 diesel with the same mechanics was made available. The diesel was discontinued in 1989, when a 1.3 L "tax special" was introduced for Finland, Italy, and Belgium. Volvo also experimented with LPG tanks, a feature available in 1979 with the Volvo 343 and 345, but with limited liquefied petroleum gas availability, sales were negligible.

== Sales ==
The 300-series was a strong seller for Volvo. Sales began at a low level, not helped by the absence of a manual transmission option and an early reputation for poor build quality. Sales gradually increased as the lineup expanded to include a manual transmission and a 5-door body style, and the initial quality issues were resolved through an interior and dashboard redesign. The 300-series cumulative production broke 100,000 units on 12 December 1983, with the total reaching 102,000 before the end of the year. The 100,000th car, finished in white, was donated to the Dutch Red Cross.

In 1988, 12 years after its introduction, the one-millionth 300 was built. Finished inside and out in red, it ended up in the DAF museum in Eindhoven. Production of the 300 series ended in 1991 after 1.14 million units were produced, averaging 76,000 vehicles per year.

While the car was fundamentally robust, the vehicle was rushed to production too early. The first (1976) model year 343 suffered from teething problems, with unsubstantiated claims that Volvo ordered its dealer network to scrap early model-year cars that were traded in, to remove them from circulation. As a result, few 1976 and 1977 cars survived. The build quality gradually improved, but was never up to the same standard as Volvo's larger models. Because of this bad reputation, the car was not popular in Sweden. Sales of the 340 with Variomatic in Sweden were down to 200 per year in the late 1980s. The 300's sales were also limited because the price of a 2.0 L 360 was more than a base 240 in the home market.

=== Markets ===
While not a major sales success, the Volvo badge ensured that the car had a strong middle-class following (often as a second car) in some places, particularly in the UK in the 1980s. It regularly made it onto Britain's top annual 20 sales tables for that decade and was the best-selling import car at several points in the early 1980s. They are robust and mechanically simple (and therefore easy to maintain). Variomatic transmissions are reliable if when properly maintained. The rust protection was poorer than that of other Volvos, but the engines were durable. In February 2016, it was reported that 627 examples of the 300 Series were still in use on Britain's roads.

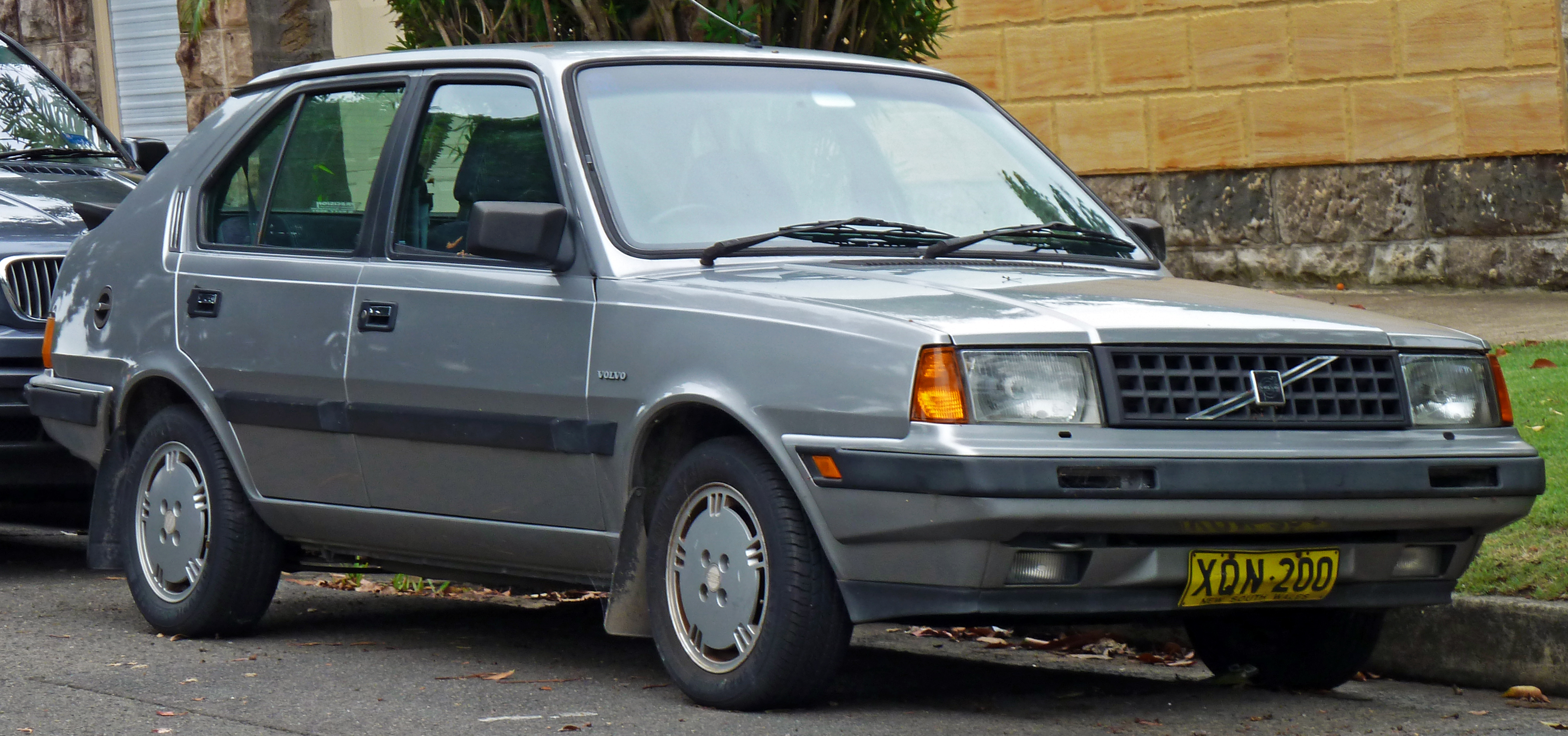
1985–1988 Volvo 360 GLT 5-door (Australia)

Up to 1982, sales of the 300-series were almost entirely limited to Western Europe. In the following years, exports to other parts of the world slowly expanded, reaching 4% of total sales in 1984. In 1985, CKD kits of the Volvo 340 GL were exported to Indonesia, and CKD kits of the Volvo 360 GLE were shipped to Malaysia for local assembly.

The Volvo 300-series was not sold in North America. Only the 360GLT was introduced in Australia and New Zealand in 1984 and exported until 1988.

== Models and special editions ==
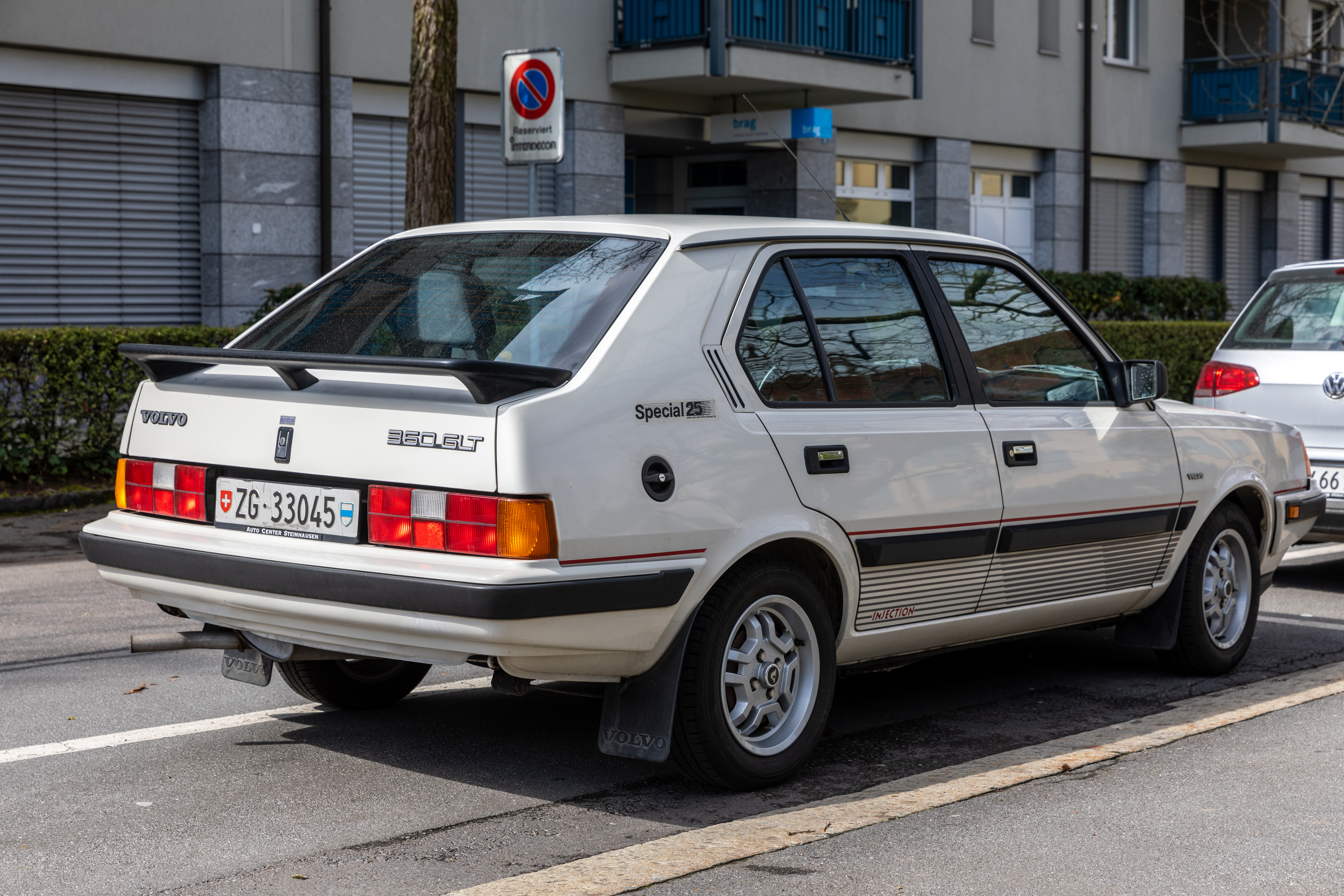
Volvo 360 GLT "Special 25" in Switzerland

The 300 series was available in various trim levels throughout its production run. There were also special editions.

Phase 1 343s and 345s were available in DL, GL, DLS, and GLS trim levels, while Phase 2 and 3 340s and 360s were available in the following range of trim levels: 340; 340DL; 340GL; 340GLE; 340 DLS; 340GLS; 340 Blueline; 340 Redline; 360; 360GL; 360DLS; 360GLS; 360GLE; 360GLT. No market received all models.

One such variation on a theme was the 1981 343 R-Sport. This was intended as a sporty offering to the lineup, pre-dating the introduction of the 360GLT by some two years. One hundred cars were produced in the DLS and GLS trim levels, featuring sporty additions such as self-adhesive 'R-Sport' decals, a rev counter, front and rear spoilers, and body-coloured bumpers and alloy wheels on some models. The B19A engine also featured some modifications, including twin Solex carburetors. Power was increased from a quoted 95 to 122 PS (70 to 90 kW).

A similar model was the 1979 343 Oettinger. This model was based on the standard 343 DL, with the 1397 cc capacity increased to 1596 cc. It was modified by the VW Group tuning company Oettinger and released in 1979. The 343 Oettinger was available in red or silver metallic. A total of 125 cars were produced.

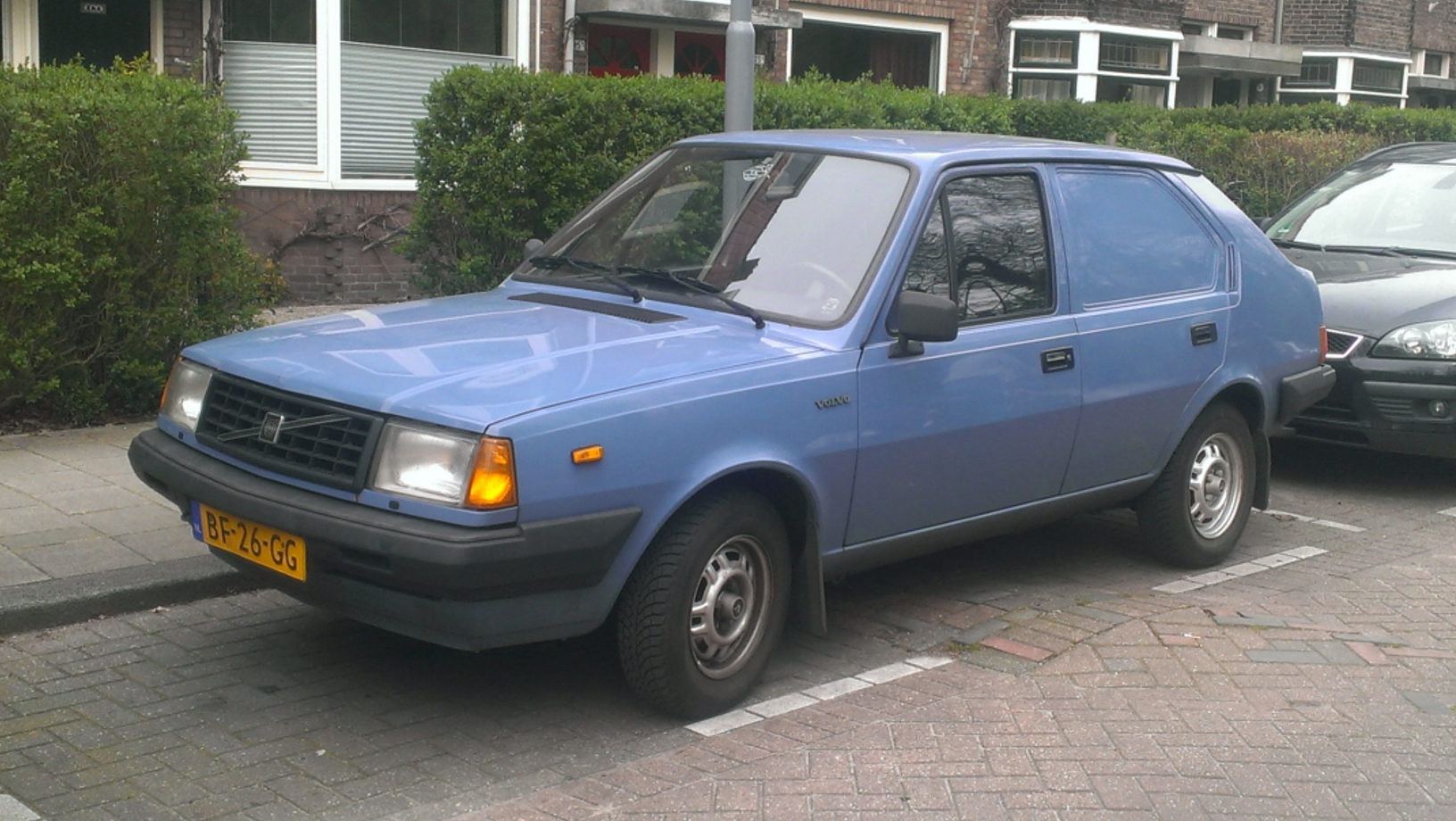
1982 Volvo 345 Van front

A van version also entered production. The van was essentially a five-door 340, but the rear doors were replaced with full body-coloured metal pieces, and the rear seats were removed. A glazed version was also available. The 1,200-litre (42 cu ft) cargo compartment has a flat floor and a metal bulkhead behind the front seats to protect occupants from moving loads. It was called "Volvo 345 Van" and was developed for commercial use at the behest of the Dutch Postal Services, who preferred a Dutch-made vehicle. It was first presented at a commercial vehicle show in Amsterdam in February 1982 and offered to the public. The only engine was the petrol B14, combined with either the CVT or a four-speed manual.

The Millionaire edition was introduced in 1988 to commemorate the production of the one-millionth car in the 300 series. This edition featured all options on both the 340 GLE and 360 GLE/T, including air conditioning, electric front windows and mirrors, alloy wheels, and a leather interior.

== Prototypes ==
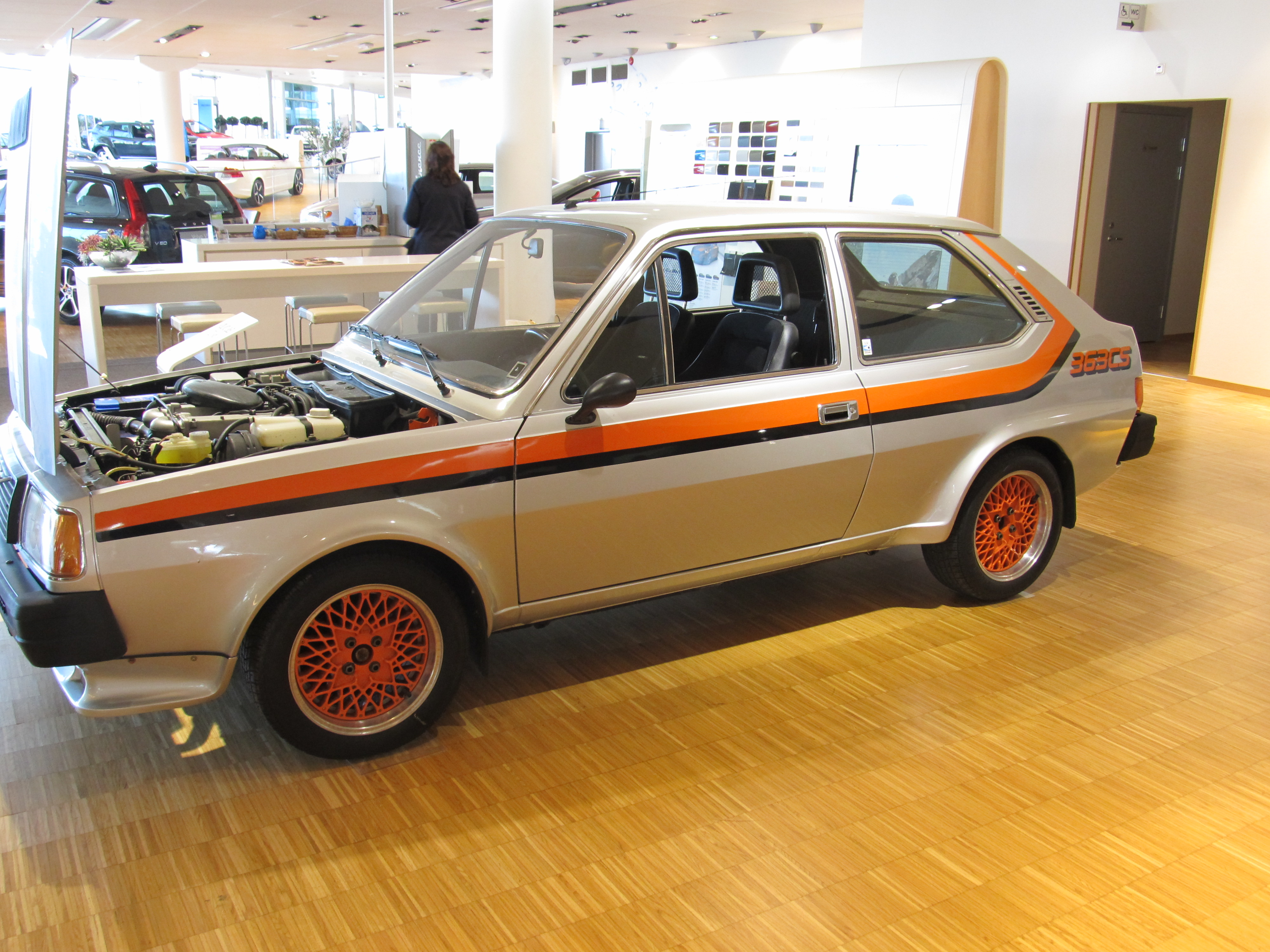
363 CS

The Volvo 340 estate and a convertible were built for design studies, but neither was produced. The convertible version of the Volvo 340 was mooted and only exists as a clay model.

The 363 CS stood for 'Competition Services', to indicate a high-performance version. The 1977 363 CS was based on the three-door bodyshell and fitted with the B27F 2.7 L V6 PRV engine used in the Volvo 260 series. The gearbox was a five-speed Alfa Romeo unit, as Volvo did not have a suitable unit to fit a transaxle design. One prototype was built finished in metallic silver with black and orange stripes down both sides. Flared wheel arches and orange-painted, multi-spoke alloy wheels were also added.

At the 1979 Geneva Motor Show, Bertone presented a three-door hatchback coupé concept on 343-basis called the Volvo Tundra. The angular design was by Marcello Gandini and continued the themes developed for the Reliant (Anadol) FW11.

== In motorsport ==
A heavily modified version using Alpine/Gordini cross-flow engines bored out to 1770 cc was driven by Per-Inge Walfridsson to win the European Championship of Rallycross in 1980. The cars gained homologation for rallying in Sweden's Standard-B class (minimum weight of 15 kg/ps) in the spring of 1977, with some minor modifications to the engine and gearing. In the UK, several Volvo 360 GLT models can be seen in action on road-rally events.

The Volvo 360 GLT also participated in a 24-hour endurance record-breaking run at the Surfers Paradise raceway in Queensland, Australia, to showcase the introduction of the model in Australia in 1984. This same Volvo 360 GLT was later converted to rallying specifications and participated in many Australian rally events and was still running in 2009.
