= John de Vries (designer) =

Dutch designer of cars and trucks (1945–2025)

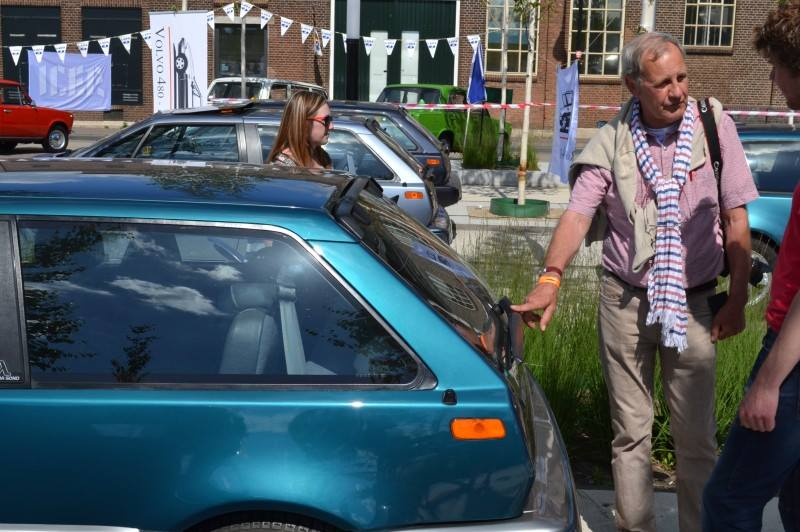
- John de Vries explaining the rear wiper design of the Volvo 480 in 2014
- Born: John Robert de Vries; 18 February 1945; Bergeijk, The Netherlands
- Died: 21 June 2025 (aged 80); Helmond, The Netherlands
- Education: Academy of Visual Arts
- Occupation: Designer
- Known for: Volvo 343, DAF 95 and Volvo 480

John Robert de Vries (Bergeijk, 18 February 1945 - Helmond, 21 June 2025) was a Dutch designer of cars and trucks.

== Career ==
De Vries started at the design department of DAF in Helmond, where he worked on the design of Project 900, the successor of the DAF 66. In 1971, out of two in-house designs and designs by Giovanni Michelotti and Bertone, De Vries' design was chosen for the car that ultimately became the Volvo 343.

In 1980, the first front wheel drive Volvo was in development, and once again competing with a number of Italian designs, Volvo in Sweden went for De Vries' design that became the Volvo 480 in 1986.

After his work for Volvo, he started to work for DAF Trucks in 1985, where he designed the DAF 95.

In February 1998 he designed the Alliance bus for Den Oudsten.
