= Scenic =

Scenic may refer to:

- Scenic design
- Scenic painting
- Scenic overlook
- Scenic railroad (disambiguation)
- Scenic route
- Scenic, South Dakota, United States
- Scenic (horse), a Thoroughbred racehorse

== Aviation ==
- Airwave Scenic, an Austrian paraglider design

== Companies and organizations ==
- Scenic Airlines
- Scenic America, nonprofit advocacy organization
- United Scenic Artists, United States labor union
- Woodland Scenics, manufacturer of model railroad scenic materials

== Music ==
- The Scenics, band
- Scenic (album), 2004 album by band Denver Harbor

== Vehicles ==
- Scenic Daylight, defunct express train in New Zealand
- Renault Scénic, a compact MPV automobile produced by French automaker Renault
- Tranz Scenic, passenger train in New Zealand

== See also ==
- Scenic Drive (disambiguation)
- List of scenic trails
- Scene (disambiguation)
- Scenery (disambiguation)
