= Scene =

Scene (from Greek σκηνή skēnḗ) may refer to:

== General ==
- Scene (performing arts), a part of the story held in a single location
- Scene (perception), a set of information that can flow from a physical environment into a perceptual system via sensory transduction

== Arts, entertainment, and media ==
=== Music ===
- Scene (subculture), a youth subculture from the early 2000s characterized by a distinct music and style

==== Groups and performers ====
- Scene, the stage name used by Japanese Punk guitarist Minoru Kojima
- Selena Gomez & the Scene, an American band
- The Scene (Canadian band), a late 1960s psychedelic Canadian band
- The Scene (Dutch band), a Dutch band formed by Thé Lau

==== Albums ====
- Scene, a 2005 noise album by Merzbow
- Scenes (album), a 1992 music album by Marty Friedman
- The Scene (Eskimo Callboy album), an Eskimo Callboy album
- The Scene, the debut album of The Scene

==== Other uses in music ====
- S.C.E.N.E. Music Festival, an annual festival held in downtown St. Catharines, Ontario, Canada
- "The Scene" (song), a song by Canadian band Big Sugar from their 1998 album Heated

=== Periodicals ===
- Scene (see London Advertiser, a bi-weekly entertainment magazine published for London, Ontario, Canada
- Cleveland Scene, an alternative newspaper in Cleveland, Ohio, United States

=== Television ===
- CBC News: The Scene, a Canadian entertainment news show on CBC, hosted by Jelena Adzic
- Scene (TV series), a BBC drama anthology for teenagers
- "The Scene" (Entourage), Entourage episode
- The Scene (miniseries), a miniseries about unauthorised distribution of films and the warez scene
- The Scene, WGPR-TV Detroit dance show, October 1975 to December 1987, replaced by The New Dance Show

=== Other uses in arts, entertainment, and media ===
- Scene (2026 film), a 2026 Indian film
  - Scene (soundtrack), the soundtrack to the 2026 Indian film
- The Scene (play), a black comedy written by Theresa Rebeck

== Brands and enterprises ==
- Scene Club, London music venue, opened in 1963, associated with 1960s mod youth culture
- The Scene (performance venue), New York City nightclub operated by Steve Paul between 1964 and 1970; commonly known as "Steve Paul's The Scene"

== Other uses ==
- Scene (BDSM), the setting where BDSM activity takes place, as well as the activity itself
- Scene+, a Canadian loyalty program operated by Scotiabank and Cineplex Entertainment
- Warez scene, an underground community of people that specialize in the distribution of copyrighted material

== See also ==
- Stage (disambiguation)
- Demoscene, an international computer art subculture focused on producing demos.
- Cene (disambiguation)
- Scenery (disambiguation)
- Scenic (disambiguation)
- Seen (disambiguation)
