= Seen =

Seen may refer to:

- Seen (album), by Tom Bailey, 2001
- Seen (artist) (born 1961), American graffiti artist
- Seen (Winterthur), a district of Winterthur, Switzerland
- Shin (letter), or Seen in Arabic, a Semitic abjad
- "Seen", a song by Kings of Leon from Can We Please Have Fun, 2024
- "Seen", a song from the musical The Devil Wears Prada

== See also ==
- Xian (disambiguation), also transliterated as Seen
- Scene (disambiguation)
