= Scenic Drive =

A scenic drive, scenic route, or scenic byway is a specially designated road or a waterway of interest.

Scenic Drive may also refer to:

== Roads ==
- Scenic Drive, Auckland, New Zealand
- Scenic Drive, El Paso, Texas, United States
- Scenic Drive, Lethbridge, Alberta, Canada
- 49-Mile Scenic Drive
- Bras d'Or Lakes Scenic Drive
- Kettle Moraine Scenic Drive
- La Jolla Scenic Drive, La Jolla, San Diego, California, United States (see also: Mount Soledad)
- North Shore Scenic Drive
- Pierce Stocking Scenic Drive
- Talimena Scenic Drive
- Veterans Evergreen Memorial Scenic Drive
- Yarra Scenic Drive

== Music ==
- Scenic Drive (mixtape), a 2021 mixtape by Khalid

== See also ==
- Scenic (disambiguation)
- Drive (disambiguation)
