= Renault R-Space =

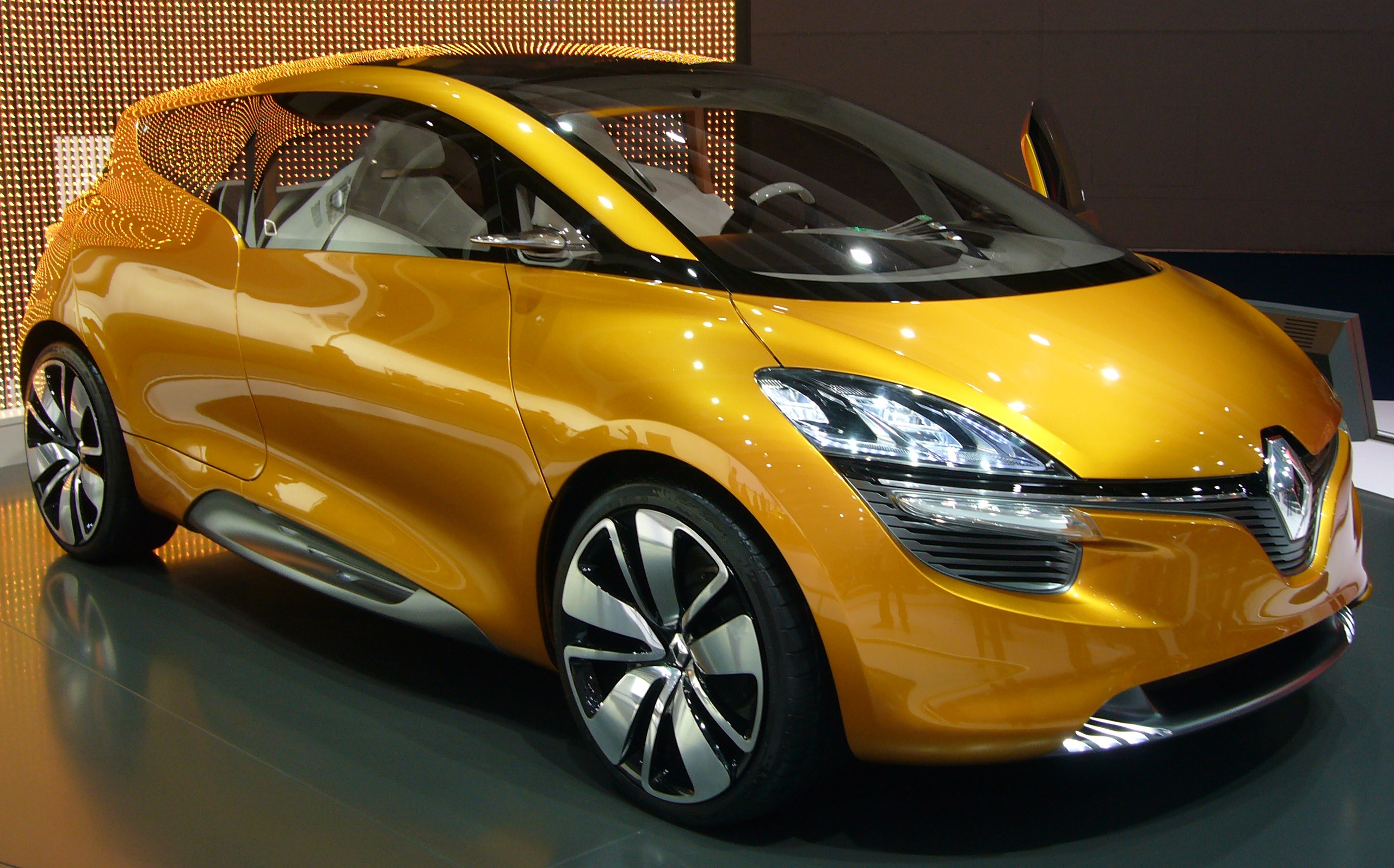

Overview
- Manufacturer: Renault
- Production: 2011 (Concept car)
- Designer: Laurens van den Acker

Body and chassis
- Class: Small family car (C)
- Body style: 5-door hatchback
- Layout: FF layout
- Related: Renault Mégane III

Powertrain
- Engine: 900 cc 3-cylinder

Dimensions
- Length: 4,300 mm (169.3 in)

Chronology
- Predecessor: Renault Modus

The Renault R-Space is a concept small family car designed by Renault for the 2011 Geneva Motor Show and is a similar size to the production Renault Mégane. It was designed by Renault's design chief Laurens Van den Acker and has handclap suicide doors that reveal a large single opening without a B-pillar.

== Technical details ==
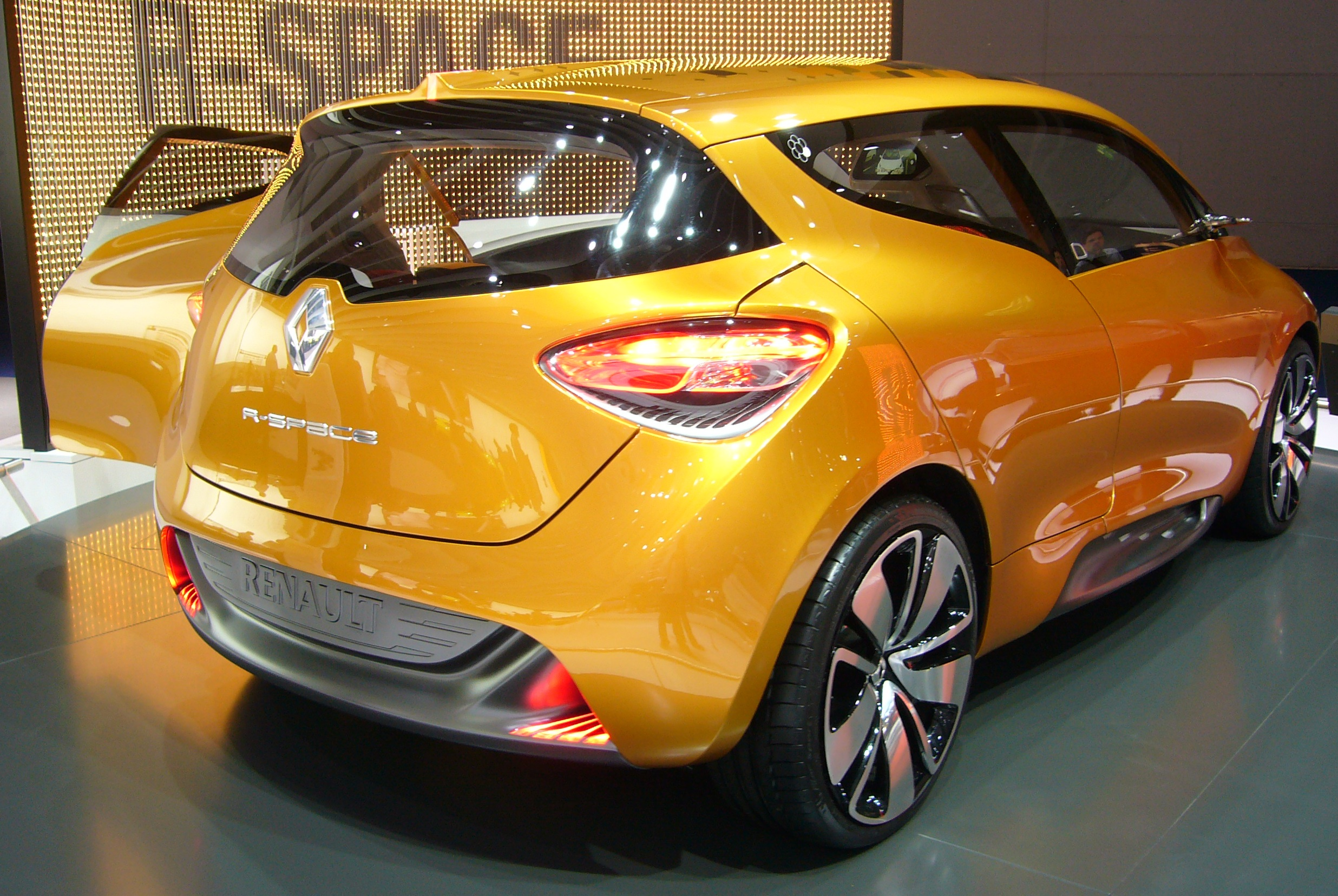
Renault R-Space rear

The R-Space is powered by a 900cc turbo three-cylinder mated to a twin-clutch gearbox. The engine develops 107 bhp (80 kW; 108 PS) and 160 N⋅m (118 lb⋅ft) of torque and features direct-injection and stop start technology and produces just 95g/km of CO_{2} and averages 76mpg. Top speed is 124 miles (199.6 km) and 0-62 mph takes 11 seconds. The body boasts a low 0.28 drag coefficient.

As a small family car, the interior incorporated innovative features such as a floating dashboard design and a rear cabin that has been designed for children with motorised cubes that can change into a number of shapes such as a booster seat and a table. The design is almost similar to the Renault Mégane III, it is a 5-door hatchback (four door, front engine). The Renault R-Space has suicide doors that reveal a single opening without a B-pillar and it has 5 seats that it has 2 suicide doors that open backward and it has a boot that opens upward like most hatchbacks.

The Autofacíl magazine of Spain assumed the car will be released in late 2012, as a successor to the Renault Modus. However, this never made it to production. The Renault R-Space concept was a preview of the Renault Scénic IV.
