= Kish Khodro =

Car manufacturer of Iran

Kish Khodro is an Iranian car company established in 1995 and registered in Kish Island. It was owned by Mohammad Saffari (51%), Bank of Industry and Mine (40%) and Kamran Naghdi, the Managing Director of BMS Automotives Ltd from the United Kingdom (9%) who sold the license to manufacture, designed the prototype and provided the know how and the production plant. The production line was launched in 2000. Company ownership changed to 52%/41%/7% in 2002.

The purpose for creation of Kish Khodro was to produce a vehicle named Sinad.

== Models ==
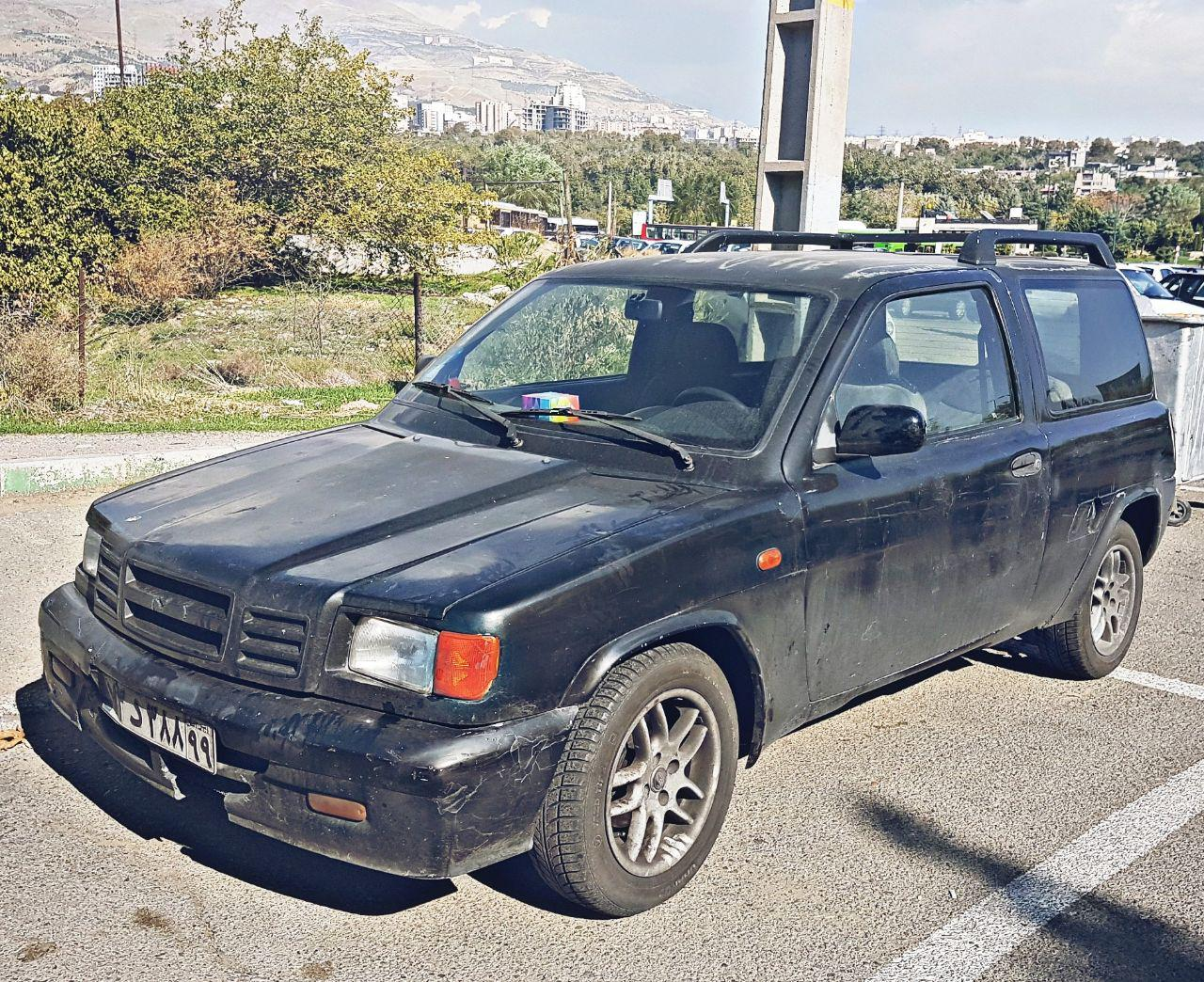
Kish Khodro Sinad

- Sinad
- Sinad Coupé
- Veek

Their original model was the plastic-bodied Sinad I hatchback (styled as an SUV in press releases) launched in 2000. This was followed by the facelifted Sinad II, which received a larger grille in three compartments. A coupé version, the Sinad III was also presented. In 2003 the Axon 5-door estate version of the Sinad was launched. The development of the car was undertaken by BMS Automotives Ltd of United Kingdom based on an existing Renault model and a concept by International Automotive Design. The air conditioned vehicle named Sinad in Iran and Sultan for export markets has a 1,600 cc (98 cu in) Renault K7M engine and mechanical components. The Sinad body was manufactured using the Vacuum Injection Shell Process. The Sinad was successfully crash tested and obtained the MIRA/VCA certification allowing the Sinad circulation in the UK, Europe and in other parts of the world. After production of a claimed 900 units in the first year, the company said they would increase their production to 3,600 in 2002. Another source states their 2001 production to have been 238 cars. Their production volume in 2003 was 100 cars.
