= Scenic railroad =

Scenic railroad (American English) or Scenic railway (British English) may refer to:

- Heritage railways operating leisurely train tours of sights such as mountain scenery, historic areas, and foliage tours
- Scenic gravity railroad, early terminology for roller coasters
- Scenic railway (roller coaster design), early type of roller coaster
- Scenic Railway (Euclid Beach Park), a roller coaster
- Scenic Railway (Dreamland Margate), a roller coaster
- The Great Scenic Railway, a roller coaster at Luna Park Melbourne
- Scenic World in the Blue Mountains, Australia, which contains a attraction called the "Scenic Railway"
