= List of scenic trails =

A scenic trail is a trail (mostly, if not exclusively, in the United States) that may refer to:

- Appalachian National Scenic Trail
- Arizona National Scenic Trail
- Catskill Scenic Trail
- Continental Divide National Scenic Trail
- Florida National Scenic Trail
- Ice Age National Scenic Trail
- Little Miami Scenic Trail
- Natchez Trace National Scenic Trail
- National Scenic Trail
- New England National Scenic Trail
- North Country National Scenic Trail
- Pacific Crest National Scenic Trail
- Pacific Northwest National Scenic Trail
- Potomac Heritage National Scenic Trail
