= Scenery (disambiguation) =

Scenery or theatrical scenery is anything used as a setting for a theatrical production.

Scenery may also refer to:

- Mount Scenery, a volcano in the Caribbean Netherlands
- Scenery (Ryo Fukui album) (1976)
- Scenery (Emily King album)
- "Scenery", a song by Neil Young from Mirror Ball

== See also ==
- Scene (disambiguation)
