= Scene (soundtrack) =

2026 film soundtrack album

Soundtrack album by Sushin Shyam
- Released: 5 November 2026
- Recorded: 2025–2026
- Studios: Mystic Room Studios, Chennai; MLounge Studios, Kochi; 2BarQ Studios, Chennai; Le Music Studios, Chennai; Soundtown Studios, Chennai; 20db Sound Studios, Chennai; Future Tense Studio, Chennai; Roldan Records, Chennai; Blue Cassette Studios, Chennai; AM Studios, Chennai; The Sanctuary, Mumbai
- Genre: Feature film soundtrack
- Length: 37:15
- Language: Tamil
- Label: Sony Music India
- Producer: Sushin Shyam

Sushin Shyam chronology
Balan: The Boy (2026)	Scene (2026)	Gracias El Clasico (2026)
External audio
- Scene – Jukebox on YouTube

Singles from Scene
- 1. "Scenuke Scene" Released: 9 September 2026; 2. "Aathi Iva Yarraa" Released: 8 October 2026; 3. "Aeroplane" Released: 19 October 2026; 4. "Killin' 'em" Released: 23 October 2026; 5. "Respectaa" Released: 27 October 2026

Scene is the soundtrack album composed by Sushin Shyam to the 2026 Tamil-language action comedy film of the same name directed by Jithu Madhavan and produced by Zhagaram Studios and 2D Entertainment, starring Suriya, Naslen and Nazriya Nazim. The film is Sushin's Tamil debut as a composer. The soundtrack album accompanied 17 songs with lyrics written by Vaasi, Rajpriyan, Yung Raja, Kaber Vasuki and Arun Srinivasan. Led by five singles, the soundtrack album was released on 5 November 2026 through the Sony Music India record label.

== Background ==
The film's music and score is composed by Sushin Shyam, renewing his association with Jithu for the third time after Romancham (2023) and Aavesham (2024); it is also his first collaboration with Suriya as well as his Tamil debut. Like their earlier collaborations, Jithu narrated the entire script to Sushin before they proceeded with the music, so that he could understand the vision, tone and mood of the specific sequences and the film overall. Most of the songs and score had been composed after watching the film.

Sushin worked on the film's music, after completing Balan: The Boy (2026) and described the album to be "enjoyable and commercial space" and would have the flavors of Aavesham which he considered challenging as he did not want to repeat that flavor. With Scene being his maiden Tamil project, he further challenged himself to suit the sensibilities of Tamil audience.

The film accompanied 17 songs overall. Social media creator Rajpriyan, besides making his acting debut, had wrote lyrics for three songs while also singing the track "Aathi Iva Yarraa". Other lyricists included Kaber Vasuki, Arun Srinivasan as well as rappers Vaasi and Yung Raja, whom of the former having contributed lyrics to most of the tracks. Composers Santhosh Narayanan and Sean Roldan had also recorded the songs "Raasadhi Raasan" and "Kaathu Veesum Desam". The other featured singers included Gana Bala, Arivu, Sublahshini, Vijay Narain, Rockzane, Kaber, V. M. Mahalingam and The Indian Choral Ensemble.

== Marketing and release ==
The audio rights were acquired by Sony Music. The track "Scenuke Scene", which featured in the title teaser, was released on 9 September 2026. The first single "Aathi Iva Yarraa" was released on 8 October 2026. The promotional music video for the story featured singer and lyricist Rajpriyan, while also serving as a character introduction for Nazriya as Maya. The second single "Aeroplane" was released on 19 October 2026. To avoid any revelations regarding the story, the team used stylized animations for the lyrical video which were used only for promotional purposes. The track "Killin' 'em" which featured in the character reveal glimpse of Naslen as Eeswaran, released on 23 October 2026. The track "Respectaa" which featured in the character reveal glimpse of Suriya as Inbaraj, was released on 27 October 2026. The audio launch was held on 31 October at Sri Sairam Engineering College, Chennai, while the complete album was released on 5 November 2026.

== Reception ==
M Suganth of The Times of India wrote "the music is refreshingly low-key. Not too dramatic as in usual serial killer films and not overloud like in mass hero movies. Sushin Shyam, making his Tamil debut, keeps it breezy [...] and groovy." Avinash Ramachandran of Cinema Express wrote that "Sushin Shyam, in his Tamil debut, delivers a soundtrack more interested in championing" the characters over the actors. Yashaswini Sri of The Indian Express wrote "Sushin Shyam's background score, his first for a Tamil film, is a standout. Making his Tamil debut alongside Jithu Madhavan, he provides a score that enhances both the comedic and suspenseful moments without overwhelming either. The songs are less memorable, but the BGM compensates handsomely."

B. V. S. Prakash of Deccan Chronicle wrote "Sushin Shyam's background score stands out. While the songs fail to make an impression, the background music adds freshness and energy to several scenes." Sia Viju of Mathrubhumi wrote "Sushin Shyam's background score deserves special mention. Marking his Tamil debut as a music composer, he adds considerable energy to the narrative. The score complements the film's twists, action sequences and dramatic developments, enhancing several key moments without losing the film's playful tone." Latha Srinivasan of NDTV wrote "Music director Sushin Shyam, who makes his Tamil debut with this film, has provided a background score and songs that perfectly complement the film's unusual and quirky mood."

== Track listing ==
Tamil
No.	Title	Lyrics	Singer(s)	Length
1.	"Aeroplane"	Rajpriyan	Gana Bala	2:27
2.	"Aathi Iva Yarraa"	Rajpriyan	Rajpriyan	3:07
3.	"Respectaa"	Vaasi	Arivu	2:05
4.	"Killin' 'em"	Yung Raja	Yung Raja	1:34
5.	"Imaginoromancophilia"	Vaasi	Vaasi	2:55
6.	"Unakke Nizhalaanen"	Kaber Vasuki	Sublahshini, Vijay Narain	2:39
7.	"Raasadhi Raasan"	Rajpriyan	Santhosh Narayanan	2:34
8.	"Maayangal Saathiyam"	Kaber Vasuki	Rockzane	3:51
9.	"Kaathu Veesum Desam"	Arun Srinivasan	Sean Roldan	2:39
10.	"Kombendhi"	Kaber Vasuki	Kaber Vasuki	3:11
11.	"Maatikichu"	Vaasi	Vaasi	1:43
12.	"Repeat"	Vaasi	V.M. Mahalingam, Vaasi	1:34
13.	"Aathiram"	Vaasi	The Indian Choral Ensemble	1:58
14.	"Hello"	Yung Raja	Yung Raja	1:32
15.	"Kattam Katti Vaaraapla"	Vaasi	The Indian Choral Ensemble	1:06
16.	"Scenuke Scene"	Vaasi	The Indian Choral Ensemble	1:08
17.	"Ayya Scene"	Vaasi	Vaasi	1:05
Total length:				37:15

Telugu
No.	Title	Lyrics	Singer(s)	Length
1.	"Aeroplane"	Rakendu Mouli	Mukesh Mohamed	2:27
2.	"Ammo Idi Evarraa"	Rakendu Mouli	Vinayak	3:07
3.	"Respectey"	Rakendu Mouli		2:05
4.	"Killin' 'em"	Rakendu Mouli, Yung Raja		1:34
5.	"Imaginoromancophilia"	Rakendu Mouli		2:55
6.	"Kaalam Disa Maarey"	Rakendu Mouli		2:39
7.	"Raajaadhi Raajukila"	Rakendu Mouli		2:34
8.	"Kalane Pilichi"	Rakendu Mouli		3:51
9.	"Gaalikedhi Gamyam"	Rakendu Mouli		2:39
10.	"Vetaagadhe"	Rakendu Mouli		3:11
11.	"Madathettesthe"	Rakendu Mouli		1:43
12.	"Repeat"	Rakendu Mouli		1:34
13.	"Oochakothe Lera"	Rakendu Mouli		1:58
14.	"Hello"	Rakendu Mouli		1:32
15.	"Sketch Vese"	Rakendu Mouli		1:06
16.	" Scenuke Scene"	Rakendu Mouli		1:08
17.	"Ayya Scene"	Rakendu Mouli		1:05
Total length:				37:15

== Personnel ==
Credits adapted from Sony Music South:

- Music composer: Sushin Shyam
- Additional music producer: Nivin Raphael, Dilruba, Saroja, Kiran Manoharan, Moses Toby, Gopu Krishna, allanfromtheotherside
- Session preparation: Christo George
- Music editor: Christo George
- Recording: Vishnu Namboodiri (Mystic Room Studios, Chennai); Amal Raj, Ajay Surya (MLounge Studios, Kochi); Amal Mithu, Sujith Sreedhar, Vishnu Raj (2BarQ Studios, Chennai); Leroy Jerson (Le Music Studios, Chennai); Midhun Manoj, Vishnu Sankar (Soundtown Studios, Chennai); Hariharan, Avinash Satish (20db Sound Studios, Chennai); Santhosh Narayanan, Karthick Manickavasakam, Rupendar Venkatesh (Future Tense Studio, Chennai); Sabari Barathi Krishna (Roldan Records, Chennai); Jomon George (Blue Cassette Studios, Chennai); Pradeep Menon, Aravind MS (AM Studios, Chennai), Vedant Uttarkar (The Sanctuary, Mumbai)
- Mixing: Abin Paul (mixwithabin); Balu Thankachan, Sreenivasa Sharma (20db Sound Studios, Chennai); pixlpxl; Akash Shravan, Rupendar Venkatesh (Mix Magic Studios, Chennai); Nitin Muralikrishna (Palindroma Music Studios, Mumbai)
- Mastering: Abin Paul, Donal Whelan (Haford Mastering, London); Balu Thankachan, Sreenivasa Sharma (20db Sound Studios, Chennai); Ohad Nissim (pixlpxl); Akash Shravan, Rupendar Venkatesh (Mix Magic Studios, Chennai)
- Artist coordinator: K D Vincent

Musicians

- Backing vocals: Gana Mani, Gana Minsaram, Gana Mohan, Gana Gullu
- Choir: Aruvi, Riya Anna Roy, Sreenandana Hari, Moses Toby, Sarang Sunil, Naifya Jaffer, Krithika, Tojan Toby, Lal Krishna
- Guitar: Kiran Manoharan, Sandeep Mohan, Godfray Immanuel
- Tabla: Anandan P K
- Bass: Aswin Lal, Derick McArthur
- Brass: Jason Zac
- Brass arranger: allanfromtheotherside
- Sitar: Kishore Kumar
- Percussions: Shruthi Raj, Erai Arasu
- Melodyne: Lijesh Kumar
- Shehnai: Balesh, Rudresh Bhajantri
- String quartet: Sravan Krishnakumar
- Vocal tuning: Moses Toby, Lijesh Kumar

The Indian Choral Ensemble

- Choir conductor: Moses Toby, Karthick Manickavasakam
- Choir director: Kalyani Nair, Karthick Manickavasakam
- Sopranos: Bavathayini Nagarajan, Asvitha Ram, Aruvi, Riya Anna Roy, Aparna Harikumar, Nidhi Sarogi, Rajeevi Ganesh
- Altos: Vanathishree Suresh, Sivaranjini Chandramouli, Nayansee Sharma, Sreenandana Hari, Sushmita Narasimhan, Geethu Nirmala, Prasanthi Keerthivasan
- Tenors: Shibi Srinivasan, Sudharsan Hemaram, Shridhar Ramesh, Vivian Richards, Karthik P Govind, Akash Ravikumar,
- Basses: Shivsundar R, Prashanth Mohanasundaram, Manikandan Chembai, Vikram Chandrakumar, Aravind Annest

Budapest String Orchestra

- Conductor: Péter Illényi
- Orchestra Indian representative: Balasubramanian G
- Orchestrators: Abhishek V, Balasubramanian G, Sanjay RA
- Session producer: Bálint Sapszon
- Recording studio: Rottenblier Hall, Budapest
- Engineer: Viktor Szabó, Dénes Rédly
- Studio assistant: Levente Böde
- Librarian: Anna Sapszo, Kati Réti
