= Renault Scénic =

Compact multi-purpose vehicle (MPV manufactured by Renault)

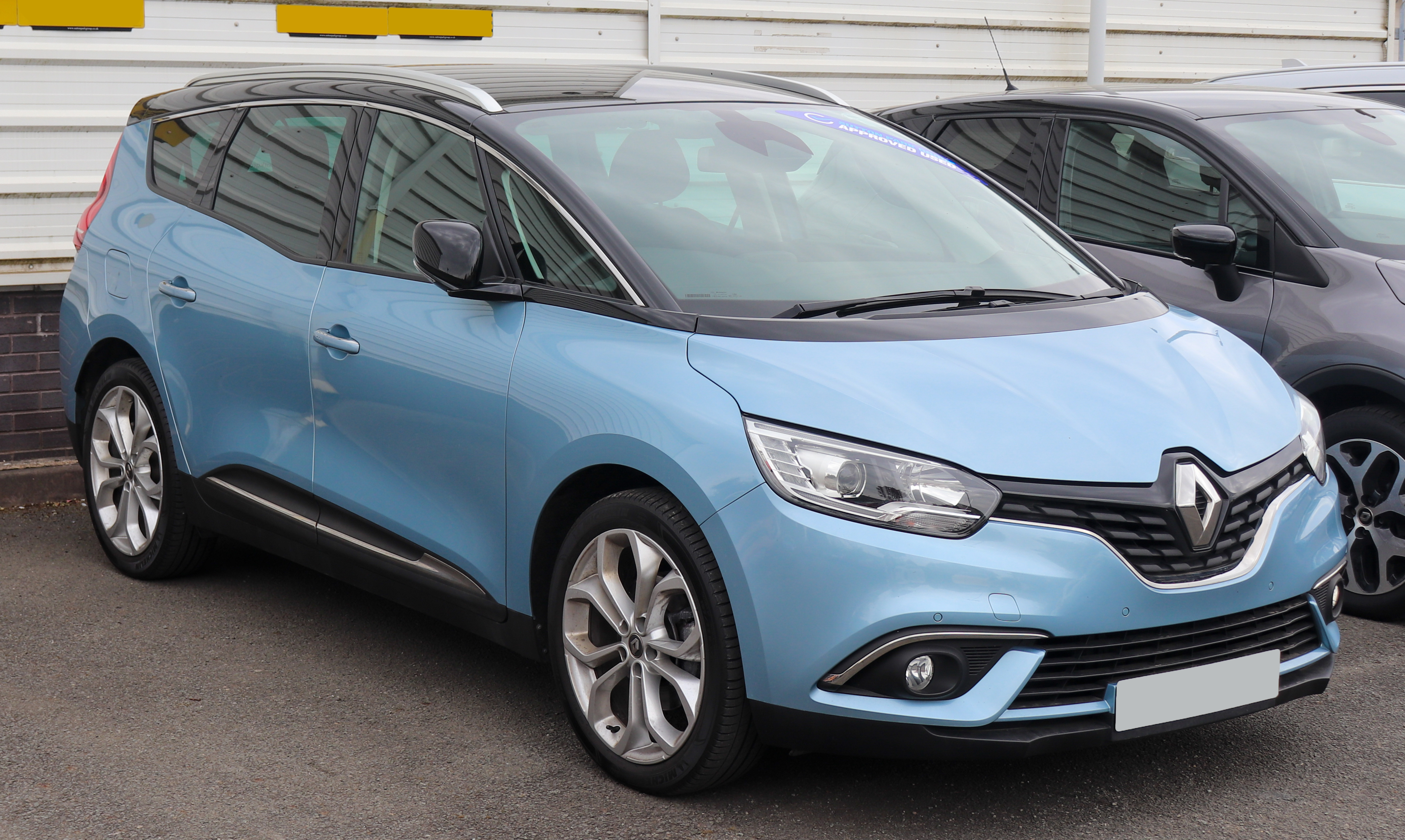
- Renault Grand Scénic

Overview
- Manufacturer: Renault
- Also called: Renault Mégane Scénic (1996–1999); Renault Grand Scénic (2004–2022); Renault Scenic RX4 (2000–2003)
- Production: 1996–2022

Body and chassis
- Class: Compact MPV
- Body style: 5-door MPV
- Layout: Front-engine, front-wheel-drive four-wheel-drive (Scenic RX4)

Chronology
- Successor: Renault Scenic E-Tech; Renault Espace VI (for Grand Scénic)

The Renault Scénic (French pronunciation: [senik]), also spelled without the acute accent as Scenic, especially in languages other than French, is a car which was produced by French car manufacturer Renault, the first to be labelled as a small multi-purpose vehicle (MPV) in Europe. The first generation was based on the chassis of the Mégane, a small family car. It became the 1997 European Car of the Year on its launch in November 1996. In May 2022 Renault announced it was discontinuing the standard Scénic with the Grand Scénic following shortly after. It was relaunched in 2024 as a fully electric vehicle called the Renault Scénic E-Tech which is the production version of the Renault Scénic Vision concept unveiled in 2022, with the production version to be unveiled at the 2023 Munich Motor Show on September 4.

The first generation facelifted Scénic added a four-wheel drive model called the Renault Scénic RX4, which was discontinued by the arrival of the Scénic II. The second, third and fourth generations have a model called Grand Scénic, which has seven seats rather than five. From the fourth generation (2016), the Scénic now utilizes 1/3-2/3 bench rear seats instead of three individual rear seats used in previous three generations, due to cost-cutting measures.

== First generation (1996) ==
Mégane Scénic & Scénic I
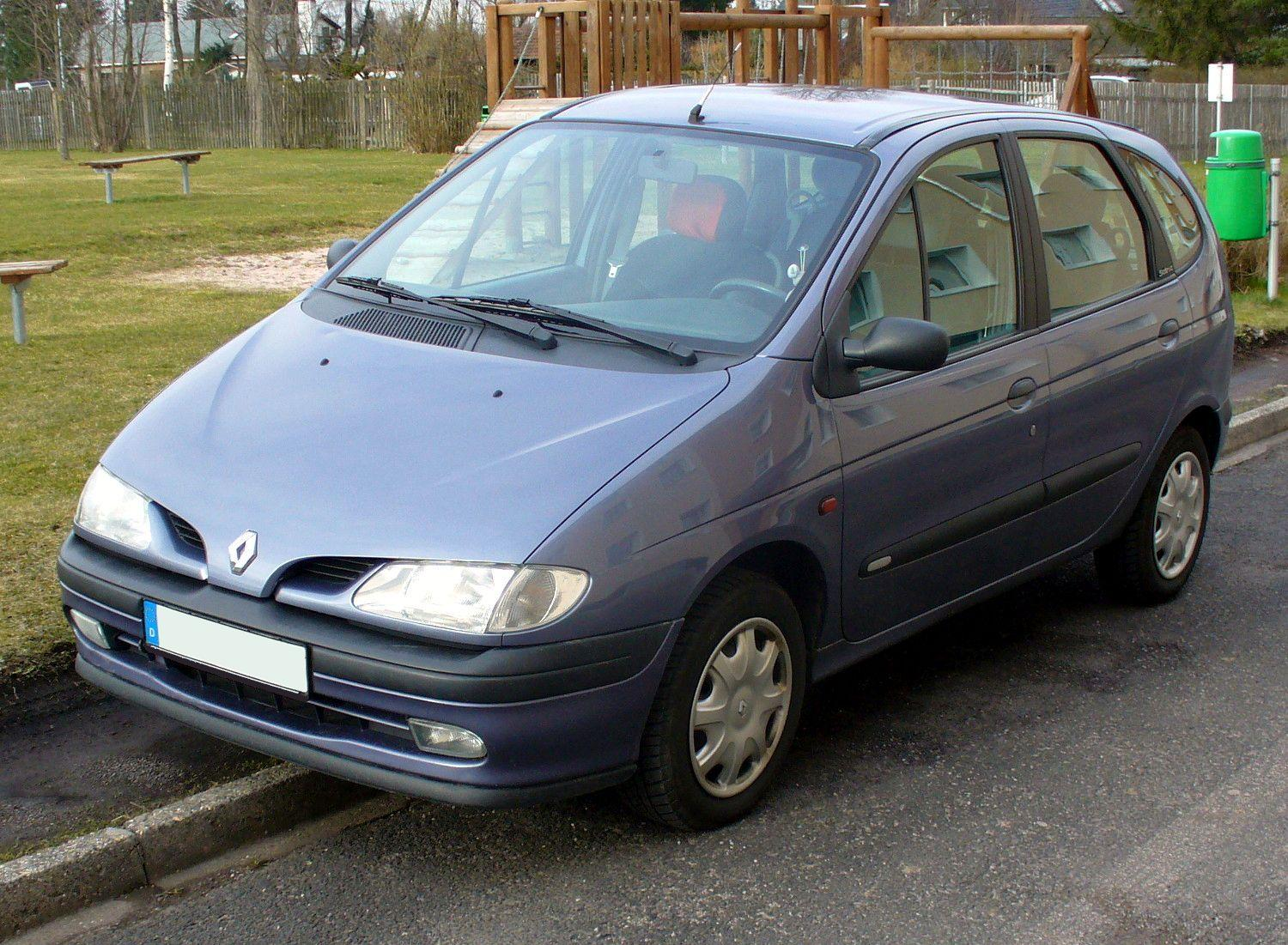
- Renault Mégane Scénic (1996–1999)

Overview
- Also called: Beijing Fengjing (BJ6410)
- Production: 1996–2003 (France); 1998–2010 (Brazil)
- Assembly: France: Douai (Douai Factory); Brazil: Curitiba (Ayrton Senna Factory); Mexico: Cuernavaca (Nissan Cuernavaca Factory)
- Designer: Patrick Le Quément

Body and chassis
- Related: Renault Mégane

Powertrain
- Engine: Petrol: 1.4 L E7J I4; 1.4 L K4J 16V I4; 1.6 L K7M I4; 1.6 L K4M 16V I4; 1.8 L F4P 16V I4; 2.0 L F3R I4; 2.0 L F4R 16V I4; Diesel: 1.9 L F8Q I4; 1.9 L F9Q I4
- Transmission: 5-speed manual 4-speed automatic

Dimensions
- Wheelbase: 2,580 mm (101.6 in)
- Length: 4,168 mm (164.1 in)
- Width: 1,719 mm (67.7 in)
- Height: 1,609 mm (63.3 in)

The Mégane Scénic can be traced back to a concept car of 1991, the Renault S.C.E.N.I.C. (Safety Concept Embodied in a New Innovative Car) designed under the supervision of Anne Asensio, then designer at Renault.

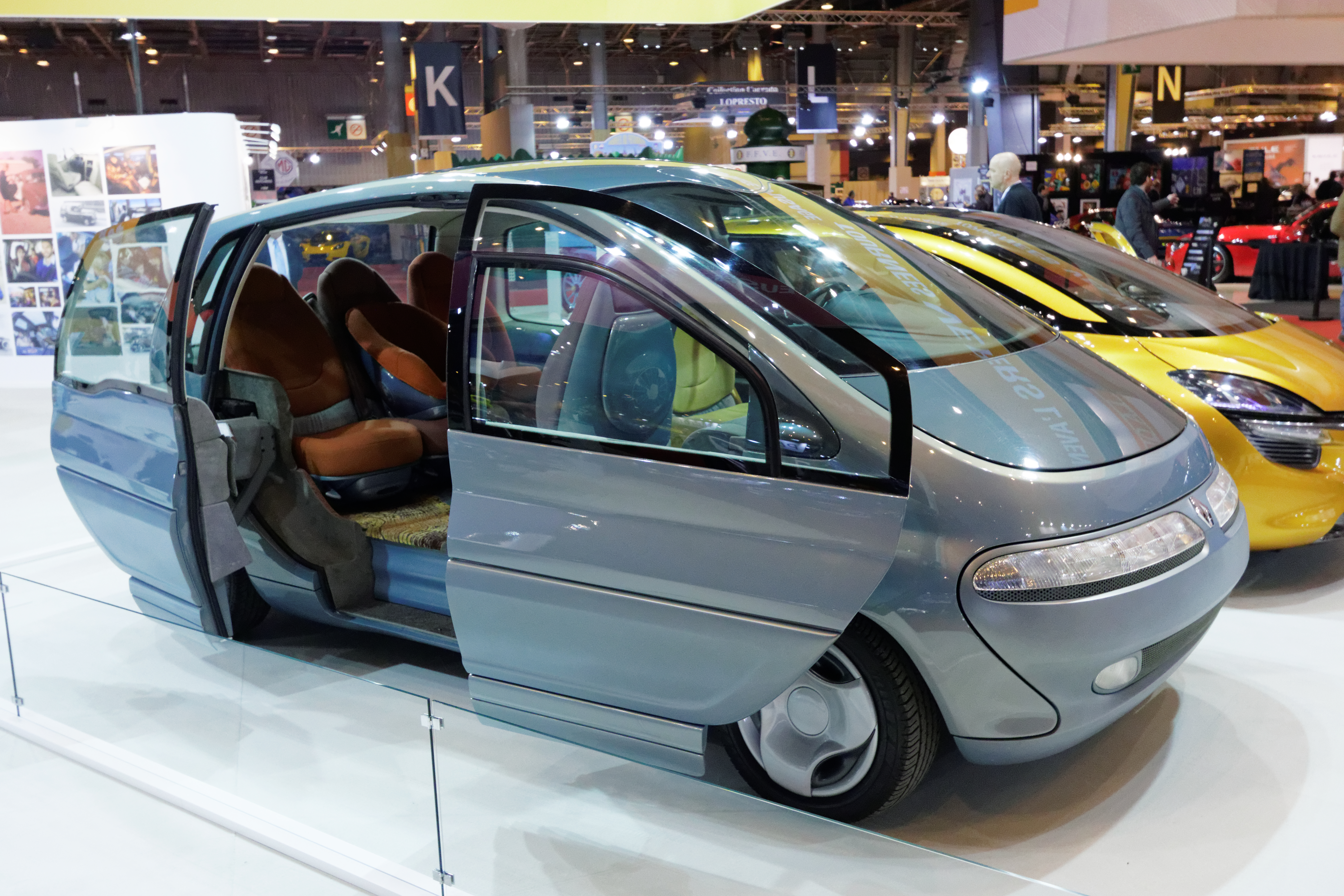
Renault S.C.E.N.I.C. Concept

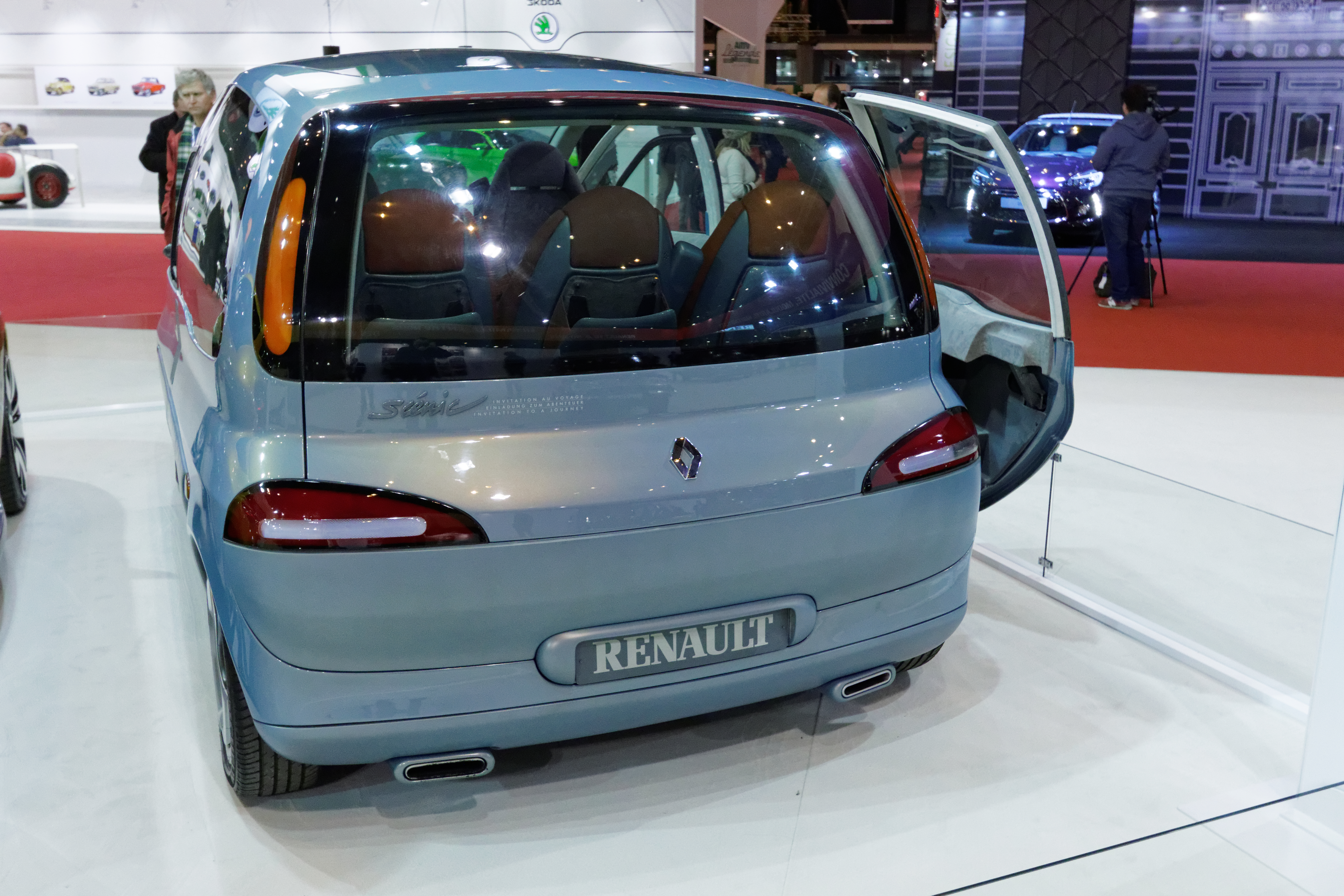
Renault S.C.E.N.I.C. Concept

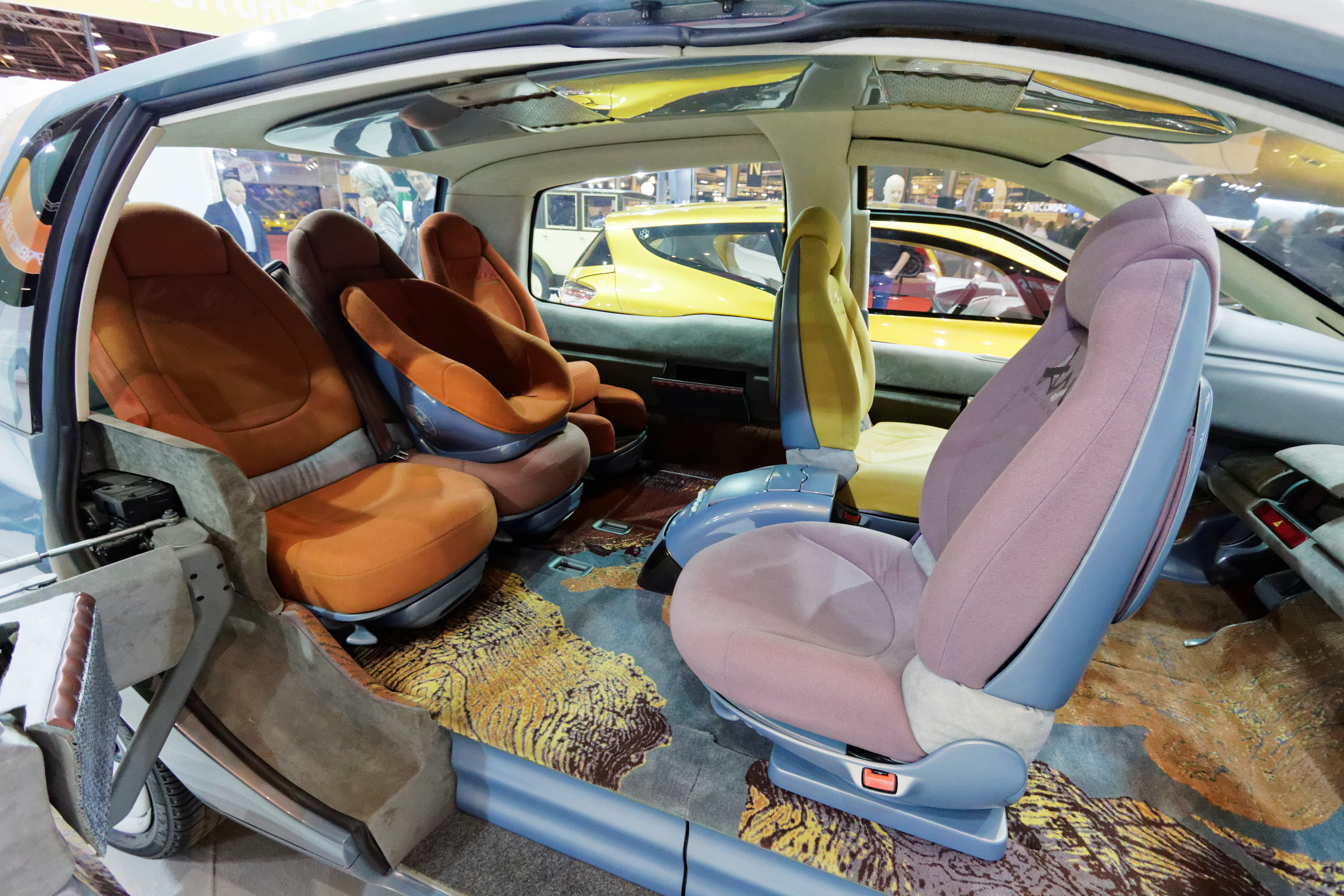
Renault S.C.E.N.I.C. Concept

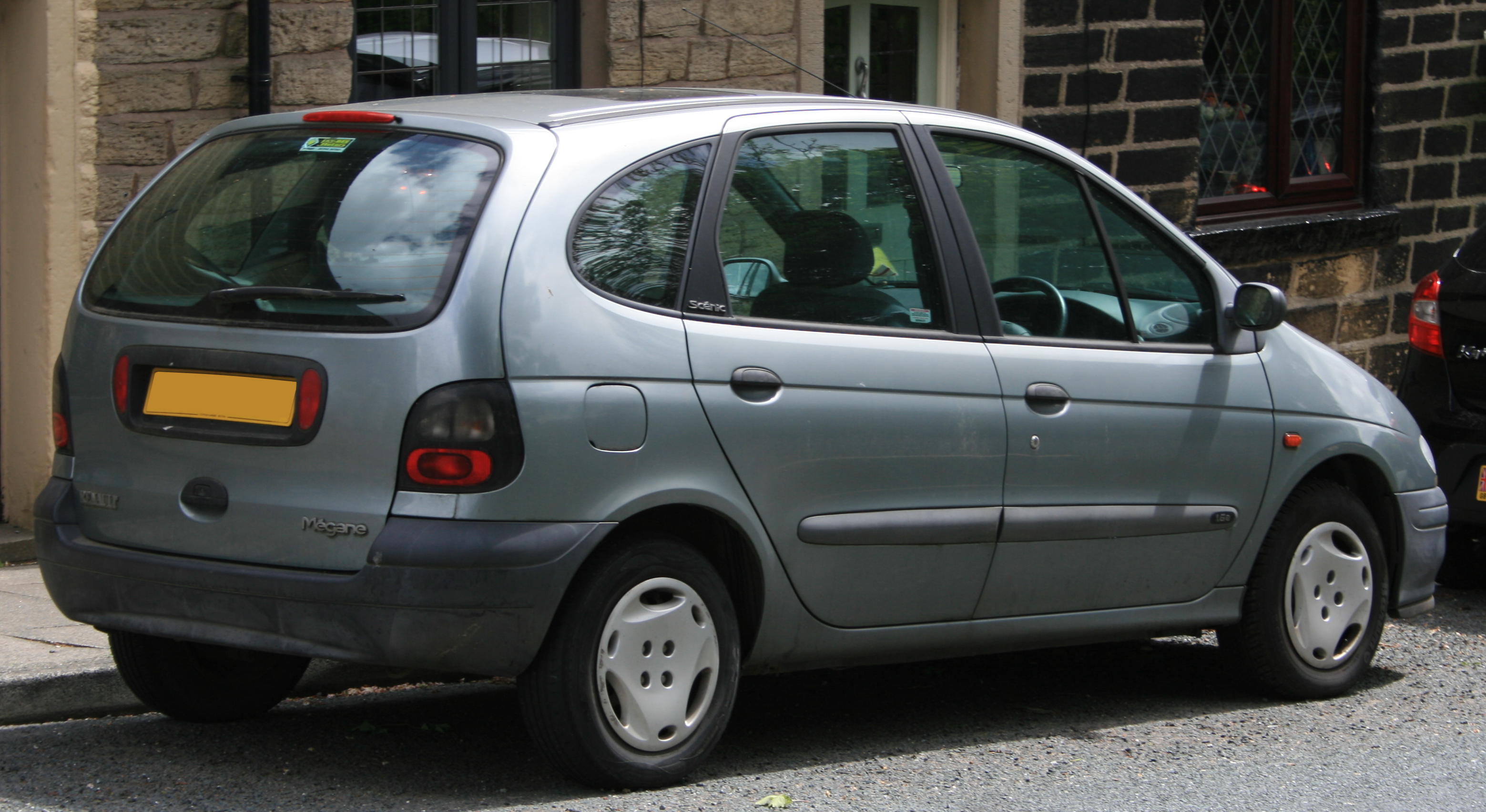
Pre-facelift Renault Mégane Scénic

The production vehicle, the Mégane Scénic was launched in November 1996. It was marketed as a multi purpose vehicle, in a smaller size and lower price than such vehicles as Renault's own Espace. As its name suggests, the Mégane Scénic was mechanically identical to the Mégane hatchback (itself based on the older R19). The 1.4 L, 1.6 L "Energy", 1.8 L "F Type" petrol and 1.9 L diesel engines were shared with the hatchback range. The production model kept the independent seats of the concept car, but didn't offer sliding doors.

Renault decided to add an acute accent to the production model name (Mégane Scénic), in order to assert its European identity, in a context of growing competition of newer car manufacturers coming from Japan.

Renault underestimated the market demand that the Scénic would have — predicting that it would be a niche model with only 450 produced a day. Production at the company's Douai plant would eventually peak at nearly 2,500 cars a day.

=== Facelift ===
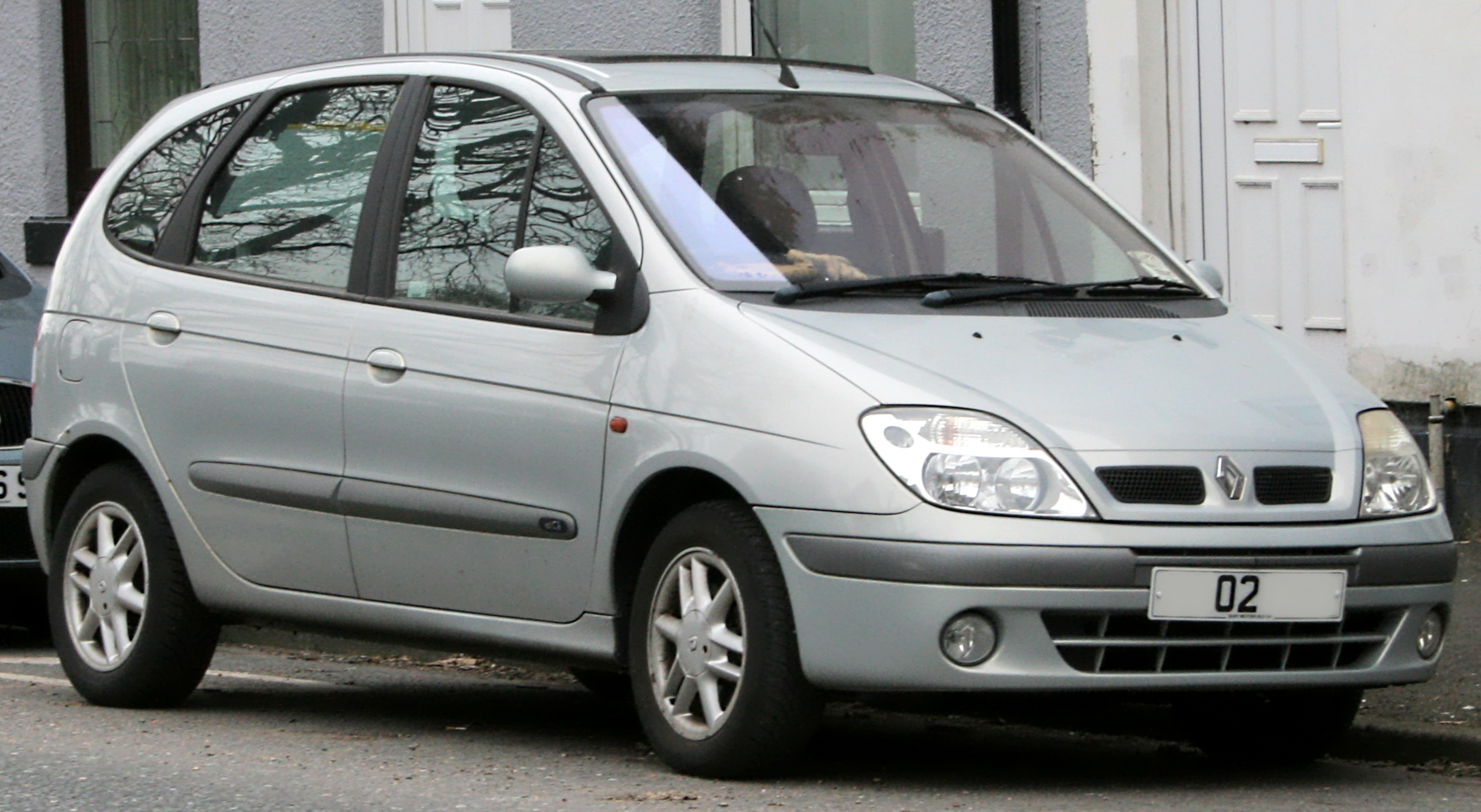
Facelifted Renault Scénic

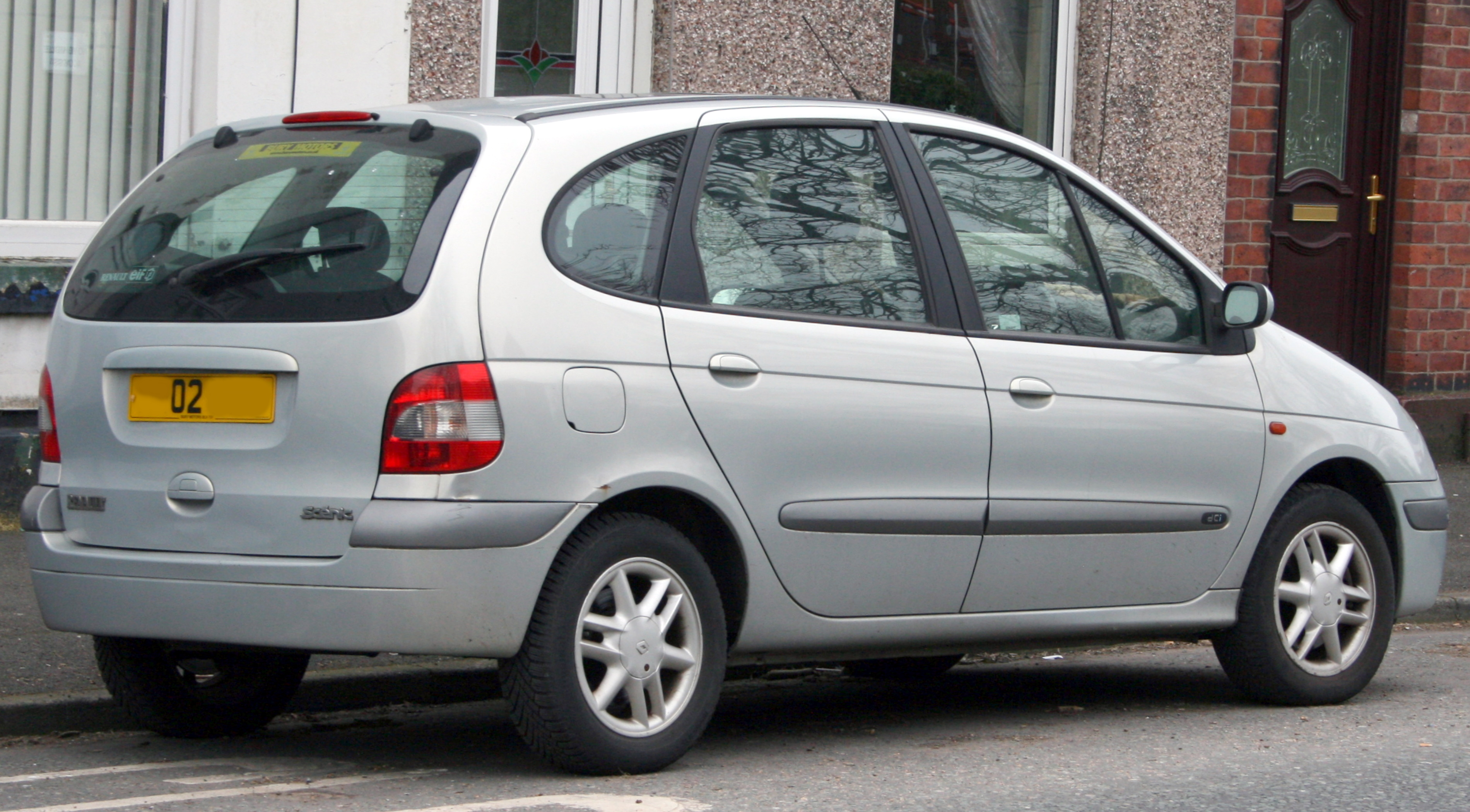
Facelifted Renault Scénic

Along with the Mégane hatchback, the Scénic underwent a major frontal restyle in September 1999, and the newer 16 valve engines were introduced. The front end was quite a bit different from the Mégane counterpart, and there were also redesigned rear lights.

From the time of this restyle, it became officially known as the Renault Scénic, although a small "Mégane" badge still appeared on the rear door signifying the car's origin. Production ended in June 2003.

The Phase 2 allowed the Scénic to be separate from the Mégane and its predecessor by introducing improvements, such as a storage compartment on the dashboard, and a separate opening rear window on the tailgate.

Another small improvement with the Scénic were the rear head restraints, which were fixed over the back of the seat rather than being upright. This increased rear visibility.

=== Latin America ===
From 1998 to July 2010, the Scénic was manufactured in Curitiba, Brazil, for South American markets. It was available with flex fuel engines. From 2006, an appearance package which added black plastic bumpers and fog lamps called the Scénic Sportway was produced. It was different from the European Scénic RX4.

It was also assembled in Mexico from December 2000 to mid-2004 at Cuernavaca Nissan plant. This was the very first cross-manufacturing operation between the two brands of the newly created Renault-Nissan Alliance.

=== Asia ===
In 2004, Iran's Kish Khodro had planned to build a facelifted version of the Scénic as the Kish Khodro/Sinad Veek, but in 2005 Renault decided to focus on their long standing relationship with SAIPA and ended other Iranian collaborations. The Sinad Veek was listed as available for a little bit longer (without the discreet Renault logos which appeared on the first prototype), but it appears not to have entered production.

=== Engines ===
1996–2003
Sales designation	Engine model	Displ.	Power	Torque	Valvetrain	Top speed
1.4	E7J	1390 cc	55 kW (75 PS; 74 hp) at 6000 rpm	107 N⋅m (79 lb⋅ft) at 4000 rpm	SOHC	160 km/h (99 mph)
1.6	K7M	1598 cc	55 kW (75 PS; 74 hp) at 5000 rpm	130 N⋅m (96 lb⋅ft) at 3400 rpm	SOHC	165 km/h (103 mph)
1.6	K7M	1598 cc	66 kW (90 PS; 89 hp) at 5000 rpm	137 N⋅m (101 lb⋅ft) at 4000 rpm	SOHC	170 km/h (110 mph)
2.0	F3R	1998 cc	84 kW (114 PS; 113 hp) at 5400 rpm	168 N⋅m (124 lb⋅ft) at 4250 rpm	SOHC	185 km/h (115 mph)
1.9 d	F8Q	1870 cc	48 kW (65 PS; 64 hp) at 4500 rpm	120 N⋅m (89 lb⋅ft) at 2250 rpm	SOHC	152 km/h (94 mph)
1.9 dT	F8Q	1870 cc	70 kW (95 PS; 94 hp) at 4250 rpm	176 N⋅m (130 lb⋅ft) at 2000 rpm	SOHC	174 km/h (108 mph)
1.9 dTi	F9Q	1870 cc	73 kW (99 PS; 98 hp) at 4000 rpm	200 N⋅m (148 lb⋅ft) at 2000 rpm	SOHC	173 km/h (107 mph)
1999–2003
Sales designation	Engine model	Displ.	Power	Torque	Valvetrain	Top speed
1.4 16V	K4J	1390 cc	70 kW (95 PS; 94 hp) at 6000 rpm	127 N⋅m (94 lb⋅ft) at 3750 rpm	DOHC	173 km/h (107 mph)
1.6 16V	K4M	1598 cc	81 kW (110 PS; 109 hp) at 5750 rpm	148 N⋅m (109 lb⋅ft) at 3750 rpm	DOHC	185 km/h (115 mph)
1.8 16V	F4P	1783 cc	85 kW (116 PS; 114 hp) at 5750 rpm	164 N⋅m (121 lb⋅ft) at 3500 rpm	DOHC	189 km/h (117 mph)
2.0 16V	F4R	1998 cc	102 kW (139 PS; 137 hp) at 5500 rpm	188 N⋅m (139 lb⋅ft) at 3750 rpm	DOHC	198 km/h (123 mph)
1.9 d	F8Q	1870 cc	47 kW (64 PS; 63 hp) at 4500 rpm	120 N⋅m (89 lb⋅ft) at 2250 rpm	SOHC	152 km/h (94 mph)
1.9 dTi	F9Q	1870 cc	59 kW (80 PS; 79 hp) at 4000 rpm	160 N⋅m (118 lb⋅ft) at 2000 rpm	SOHC	162 km/h (101 mph)
1.9 dTi	F9Q	1870 cc	72 kW (98 PS; 97 hp) at 4000 rpm	200 N⋅m (148 lb⋅ft) at 2250 rpm	SOHC	174 km/h (108 mph)
1.9 dCi	F9Q	1870 cc	75 kW (102 PS; 101 hp) at 4000 rpm	200 N⋅m (148 lb⋅ft) at 1500 rpm	SOHC	177 km/h (110 mph)

=== Scenic RX4 ===
Scenic RX4
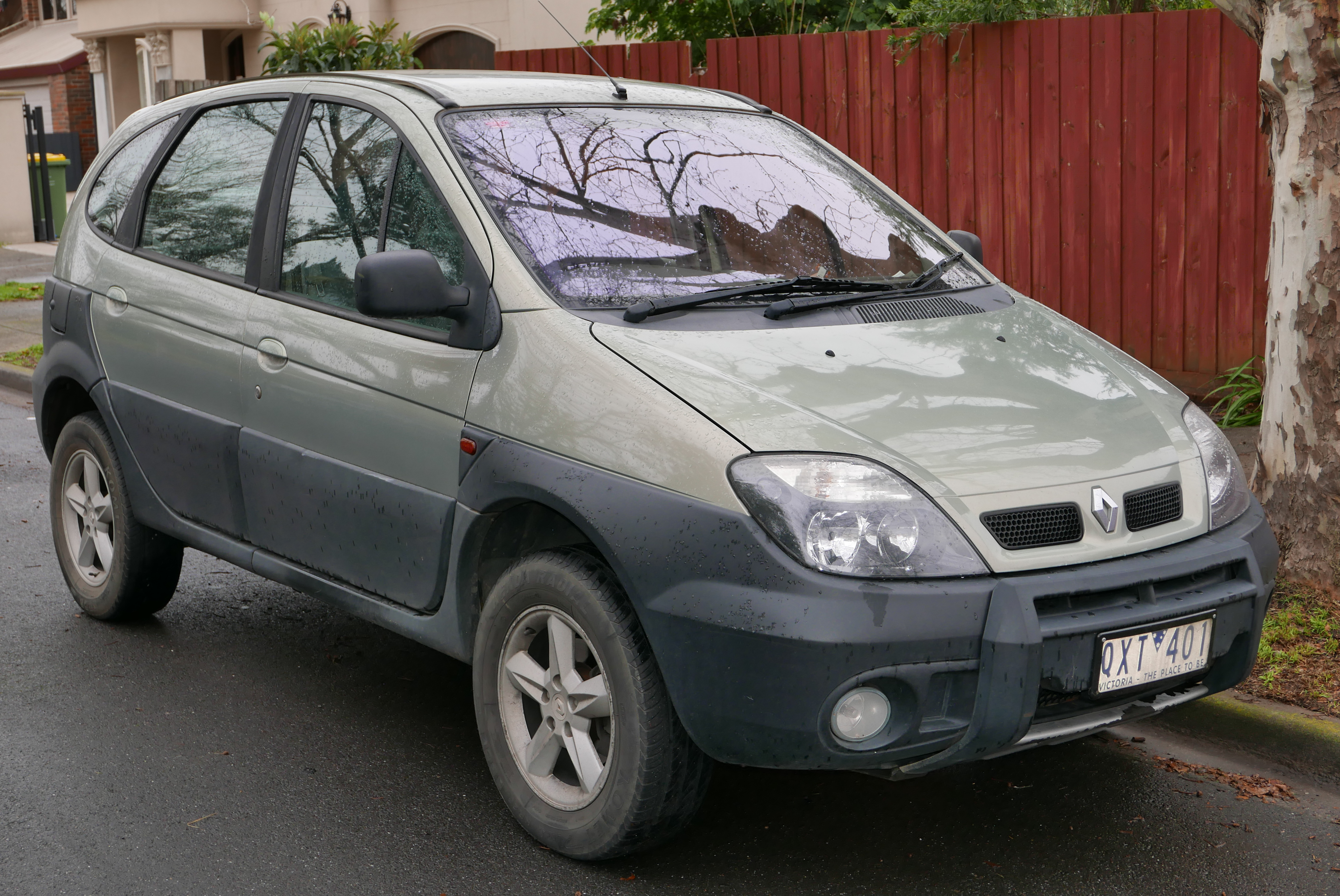
- Renault Scénic RX4

Overview
- Production: 2000–2003 (France)
- Assembly: France: Douai (Douai Factory)
- Designer: Patrick Le Quément

Powertrain
- Engine: Petrol: 2.0 L F4R 16V I4; Diesel: 1.9 L F9Q I4
- Transmission: 5-speed manual

Dimensions
- Wheelbase: 2,624 mm (103.3 in)
- Length: 4,444 mm (175.0 in)
- Width: 1,785 mm (70.3 in)
- Height: 1,730 mm (68.1 in)
- Curb weight: 1440kg (3174lbs)

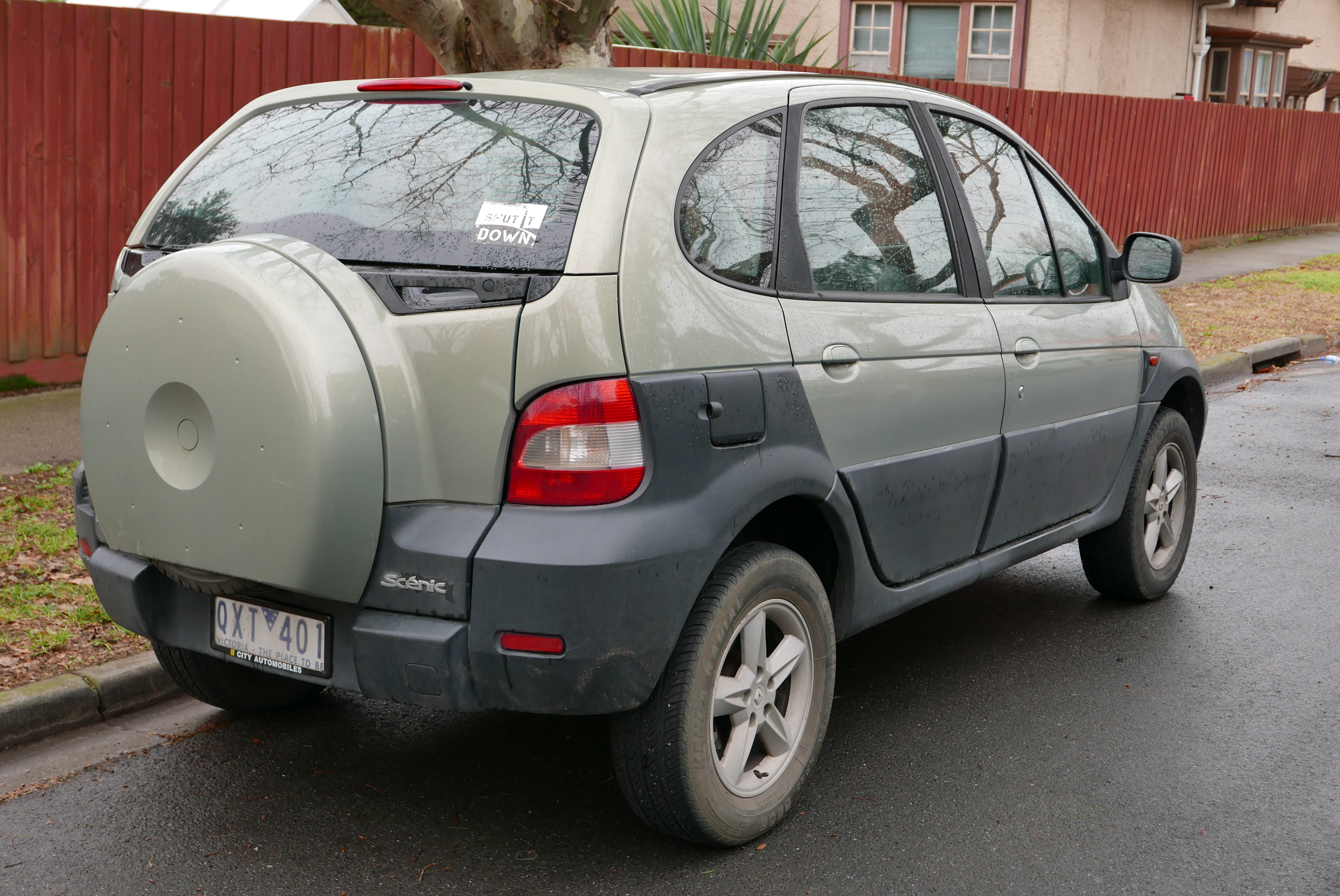
Renault Scenic RX4 Privilege

Renault developed a four-wheel drive crossover derivative of the original Scénic, the Scénic RX4, launched in 2000 in both LHD and RHD formats. Featuring a viscous, multi disc central differential designed by Austrian specialists Steyr Daimler Puch, it offered part time four wheel drive. The rear suspension was re-engineered, the suspension was strengthened, the gearbox was redesigned to accommodate the four-wheel drive system, and the engine undercover was thickened and strengthened. The exterior was also changed, featuring plastic cladding around the entire car, a spare wheel on the tailgate, and different wheels from the standard Scénic, using five lug-nuts as opposed to the standard four.

The new rear suspension now occupied part of the space that was used for the spare wheel well and led to the spare tyre being placed on the rear hatch, which was converted into a split swing out tailgate. To save weight, the redesigned tailgate was constructed from plastic, which meant the door was prone to cracking under its own weight with the spare wheel under normal use (becoming especially prevalent as the plastic aged). The RX4 rode higher with increased suspension travel and larger wheels than the Scenic.

While these changes provided better ground clearance, the RX4 was offered with 2.0-litre petrol and 1.9-dci diesel engines, both already known from the Mégane. Unlike the standard Scénic, the RX4 was only offered with a 5 speed manual transmission, with no automatic transmission available.

In most markets, the RX4 was offered in several trim levels, including the Sport Alize (2000), Privilege Monaco (2000), Expression (2001–2003), Dynamique (2001–2003), Salomon (2001–2003), Sportway (2001–2003), and Privilege (2001–2003). In less popular markets such as Australia, the RX4 was only offered the Expression and Privilege trim levels.

The RX4 was also offered with twin electric sunroofs, a luxury pack (including leather seats, climate control, and a CD player), a spare wheel cover, and roof racks as optional extras.

The RX4 sales made a good start (becoming France's best-selling 4wd vehicle in 2001), but sales rapidly declined due to poor gearbox reliability. Renault only produced 40,000 examples of the RX4, 5000 right-hand drive and 35,000 left-hand drive examples. Production was ultimately halted due to the arrival of the Scénic II and due to poor sales. Production of the RX4 ceased in December 2003, with no direct successor, most likely a result of the unreliability of the Steyr Daimler Puch 4wd system. It was eventually partially replaced in 2007 by the 2wd Scénic Conquest.

The RX4 sold particularly poorly in Australia, New Zealand, Japan, and Malaysia. Selling fewer than 500 units in each country. Due to low demand, these countries did not receive the diesel F9Q engine, instead only receiving the petrol F4R engine.

As of 2023, approximately only 1,500 of the original 40,000 RX4 examples remain on the road worldwide. The RX4 is the second rarest Renault model of the 2000s, following the Renault Avantime. This low number is attributed to low parts availability and reliability; with no more parts produced and a limited number of RX4's built, parts are becoming increasingly scarce.

Scénic RX4
Sales designation	Engine model	Fuel type	Oil Viscosity	Aspiration	Cyl.	Displ.	Power	Torque	Valvetrain	Valves	Top speed	0-100kph
2.0 16V	F4R	Petrol	10w-40/15w-40	Naturally Aspirated	4	1998 cc	102 kW (139 PS; 137 hp) at 5500 rpm	188 N⋅m (139 lb⋅ft) at 3750 rpm	DOHC	16	180 km/h (110 mph)	11.9
1.9 dCi	F9Q	Diesel	5w-40	Turbocharged	4	1870 cc	75 kW (102 PS; 101 hp) at 4000 rpm	200 N⋅m (148 lb⋅ft) at 1500 rpm	SOHC	8	160 km/h (99 mph)	14.3

== Second generation (2003) ==
Scénic II
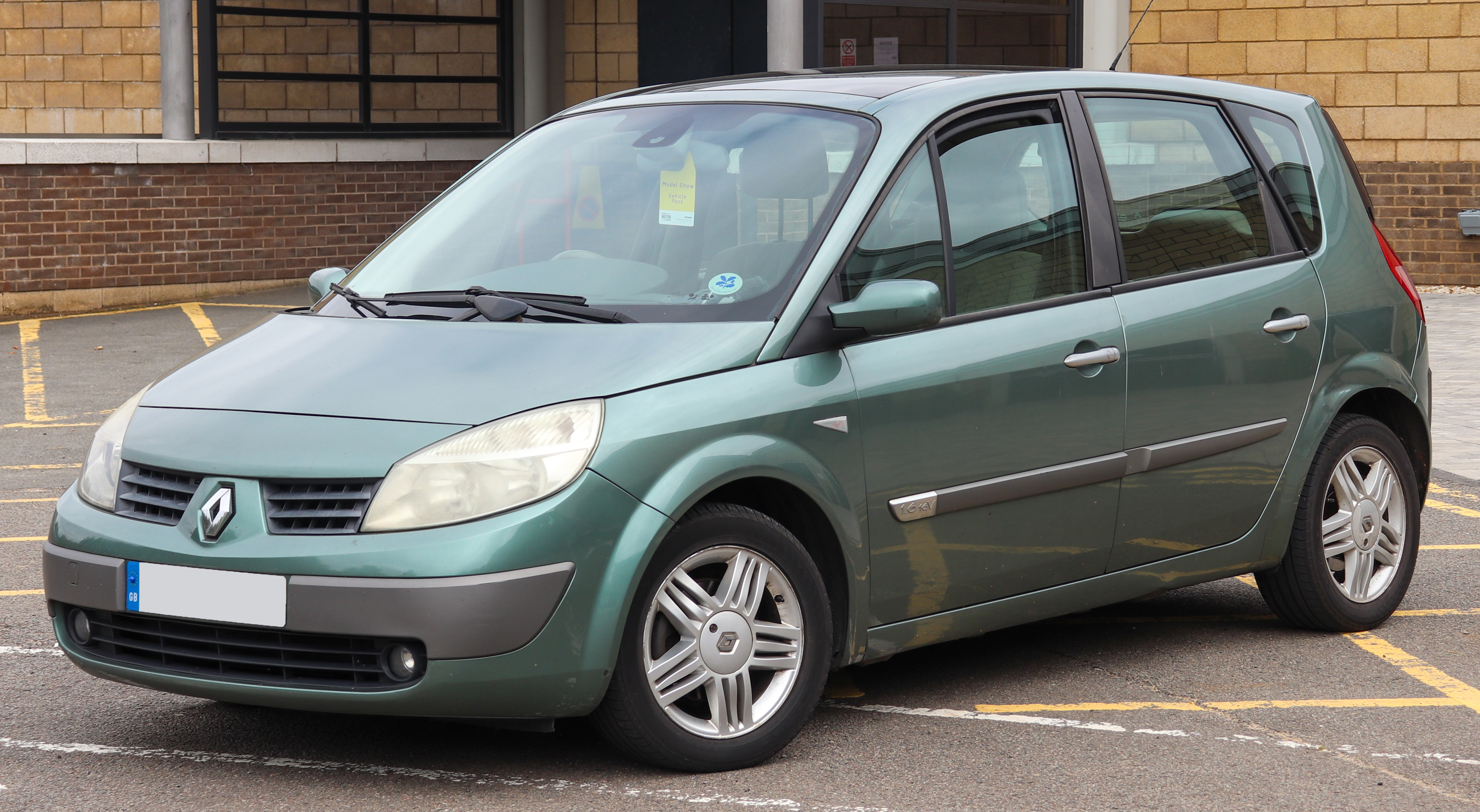
- Pre-facelift Renault Scénic

Overview
- Production: June 2003–2009
- Assembly: France: Douai (Douai Factory)
- Designer: Vincent Pedretti (exterior)

Body and chassis
- Platform: Renault–Nissan C Platform
- Related: Renault Mégane

Powertrain
- Engine: Petrol: 1.4 L K4J 16V I4; 1.6 L K4M 16V I4; 2.0 L F4R 16V I4; 2.0 L F4Rt 16V turbocharged I4; Diesel: 1.5 L K9K 8V I4 dCi; 1.9 L F9Q 8V I4 dCi; 2.0 L M9R 16V I4 dCi

Dimensions
- Wheelbase: 2,685 mm (105.7 in) (Scénic); 2,736 mm (107.7 in) (Grand Scénic)
- Length: 4,259 mm (167.7 in) (Scénic); 4,493 mm (176.9 in) (Grand Scénic)
- Width: 1,811 mm (71.3 in)
- Height: 1,621 mm (63.8 in) (Scénic); 1,641 mm (64.6 in) (Grand Scénic)

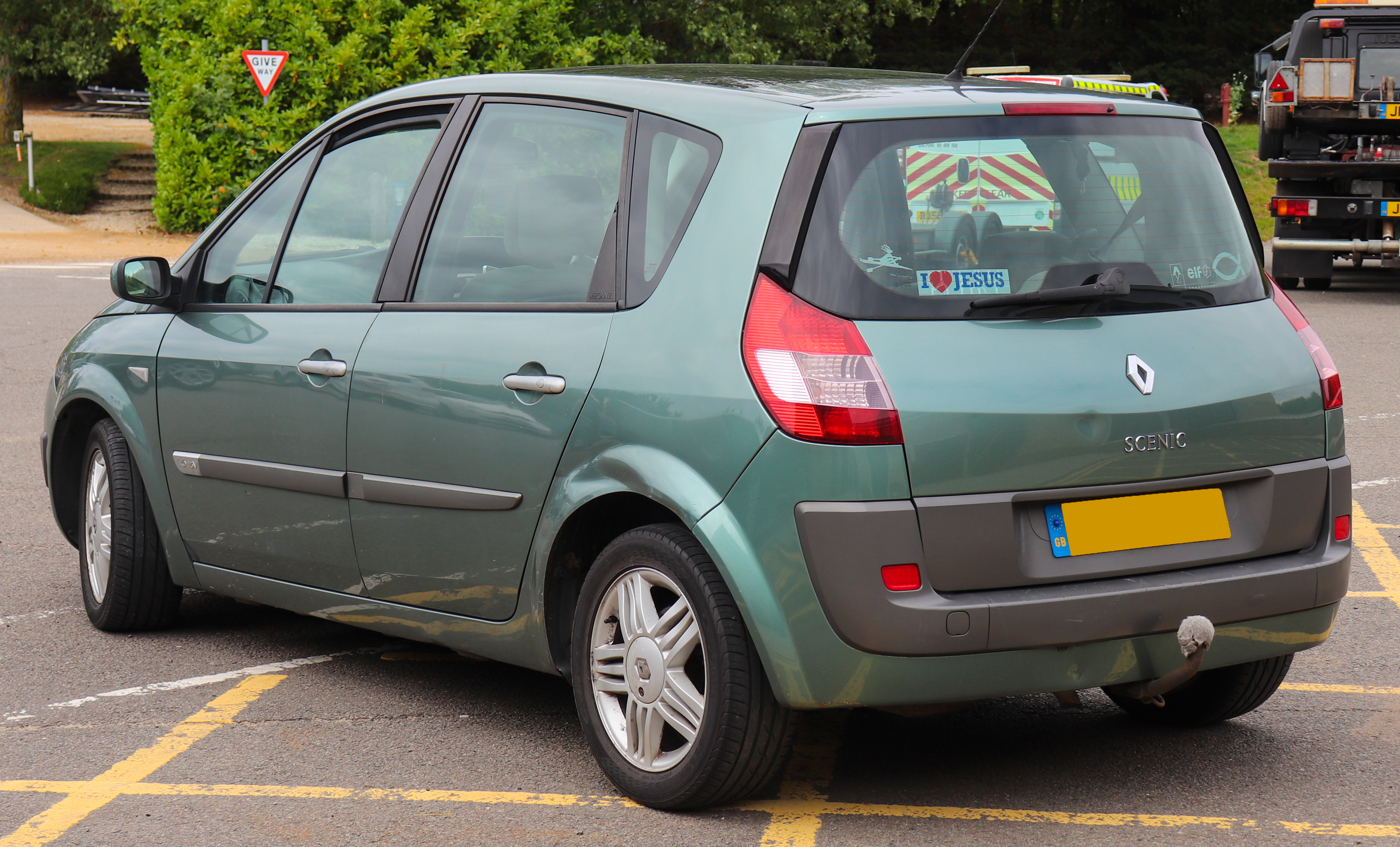
Pre-facelift Renault Scénic

Shortly after the launch of the Mégane II, an all new Scénic was launched in June 2003. There was also a seven-seater Compact MPV Grand Scénic, with a longer wheelbase and rear overhang, which has two small child sized seats in the enlarged luggage area. The Grand Scénic was officially launched in April 2004.

As with the Mégane, the new car employs corporate styling cues and new technology, including the "Renault Card" keyless immobiliser and an automatic parking brake on certain trim levels. It integrates LEDs on all trims since 2006. As with the Scénic I Phase 2, a raised "Mégane" logo appears on the C pillar.

The car received a different dashboard design to that of the Mégane, and featured a fully digital electroluminescence instrument display.

The Scénic II includes folding rear passenger seats, each separately adjustable and removable. With integrated table, a folding front passenger seat (on certain trim levels), automatic headlights and windscreen wipers, 'Child minder' mirror, as well as front and rear electric windows.

=== Facelift ===
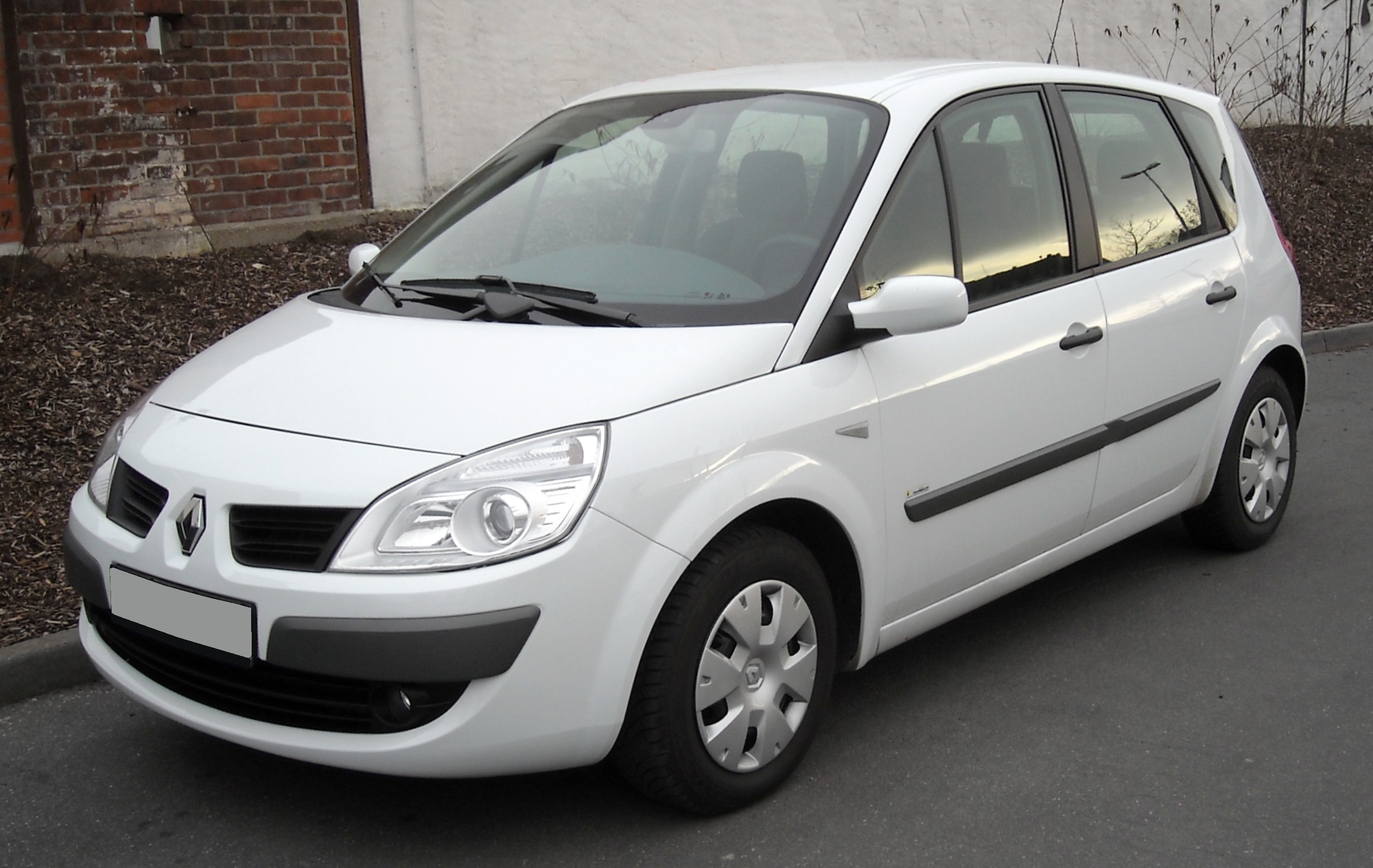
Post-facelift Renault Scénic

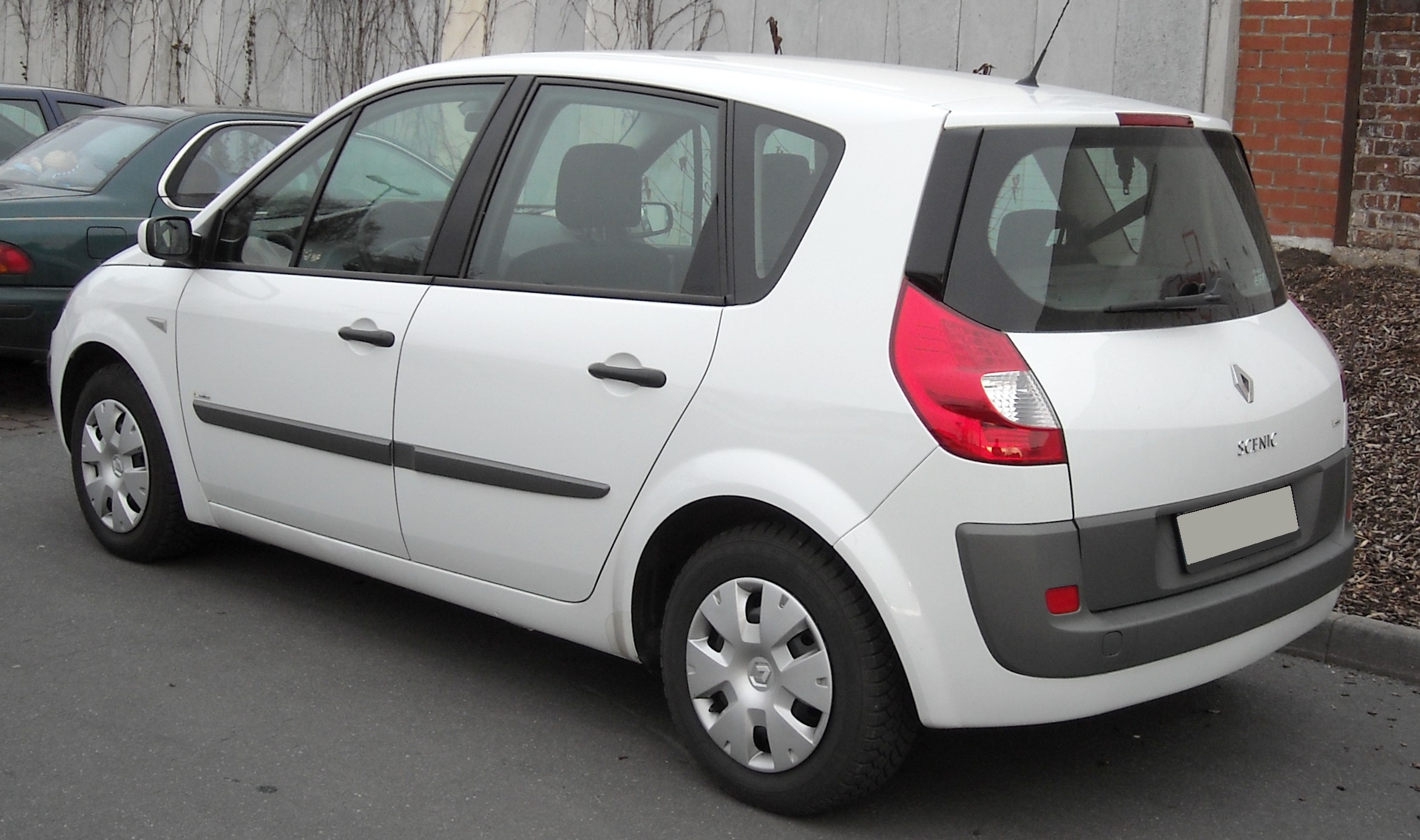
Post-facelift Renault Scénic

Like the Mégane a few months earlier in 2006, the Scénic II underwent a minor facelift (phase 2) with a revised grille, larger diamond badge, restyled headlights, the addition of a "RENAULT" word badge on the bootlid, restyled tail lenses and new wheel designs and interior trim. Sales commenced in September 2006.

=== Scénic Conquest ===
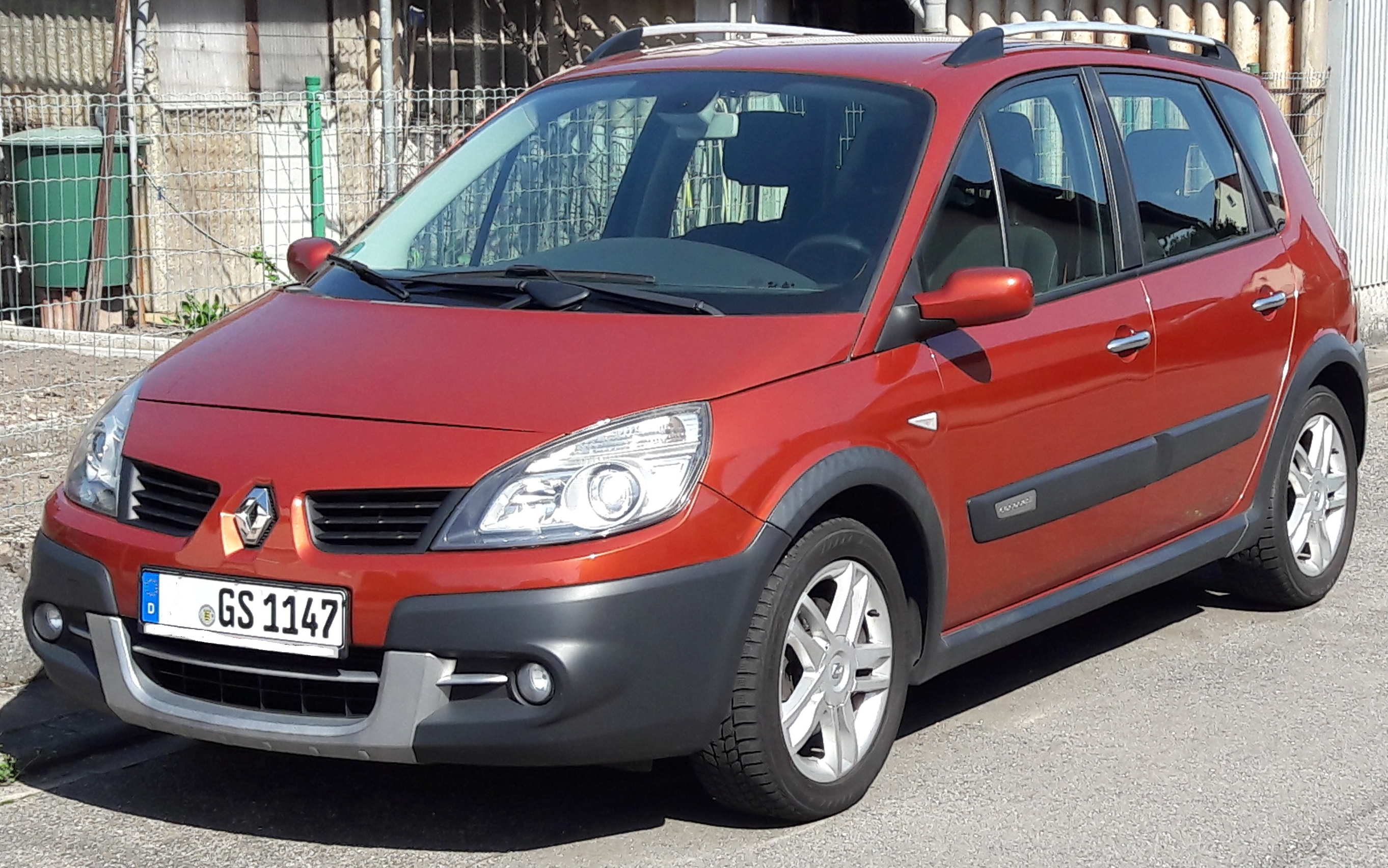
Renault Scénic Conquest

In June 2007, the RX4's spiritual successor was revealed as the Scénic Conquest. Despite being two-wheel drive, the Conquest has a body kit, raised ride height, and other features accessories usually reserved for SUVs.

=== Safety ===
ANCAP test results Renault Scenic (2004)
Test	Score
Overall	5 /5 stars
Frontal offset	15.12/16
Side impact	16/16
Pole	2/2
Seat belt reminders	1/3
Whiplash protection	Not Assessed
Pedestrian protection	Marginal
Electronic stability control	Not Assessed

== Third generation (2009) ==
Scénic III
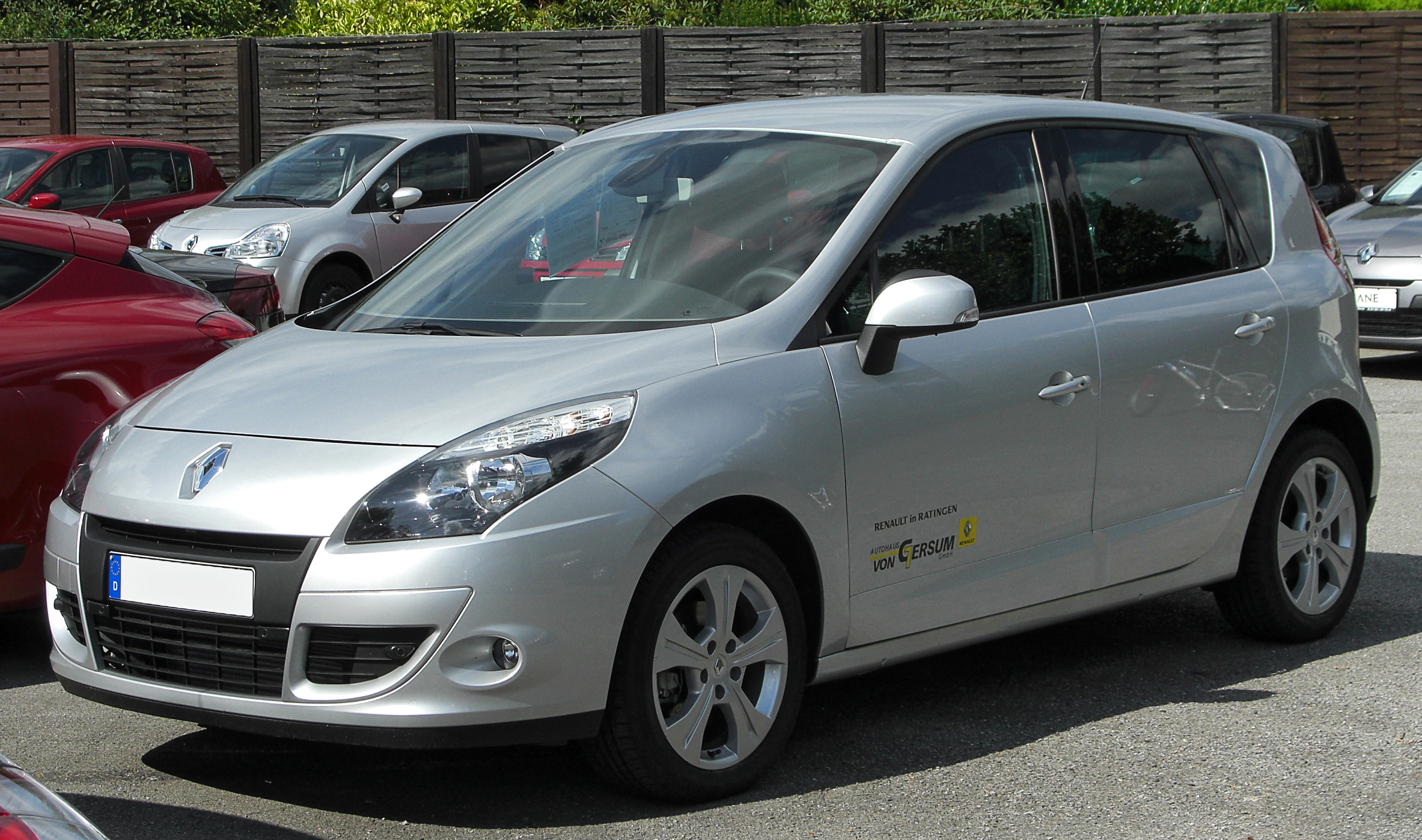

Overview
- Model code: X95
- Production: 2009–2016
- Assembly: France: Douai (Douai Factory)
- Designer: Fabio Filippini

Body and chassis
- Platform: Renault–Nissan C Platform
- Related: Renault Mégane III

Powertrain
- Engine: Petrol: 1.2 L H5Ft turbo GDI I4; 1.4 L H4Jt turbo GDI I4; 1.6 L K4M I4; 2.0 L M4R I4; Diesel: 1.5 L K9K I4; 1.6 L R9M I4; 1.9 L F9Q I4; 2.0 L M9R I4

Dimensions
- Wheelbase: 2,700 mm (106.3 in) (Scénic); 2,769 mm (109.0 in) (Grand Scénic)
- Length: 4,343 mm (171.0 in) (Scénic); 4,559 mm (179.5 in) (Grand Scénic)
- Width: 1,844 mm (72.6 in)
- Height: 1,636 mm (64.4 in) (Scénic); 1,643 mm (64.7 in) (Grand Scénic)

The Scénic III was released in July 2009, while the seven seater 'Grand' version (New Grand Scénic) was released in May 2009. Like the previous Scénic, there is also a seven-seater Compact MPV Grand Scénic. Renault also offers the Grand Scénic as a five-seater.

Differences such as plastic cladding, raised suspension and different wheels to the normal spec Scénic.

=== Facelift ===
In January 2012, the Scénic and Grand Scénic was mildly facelifted with a new front end, new engines and a new digital instrument cluster design.

An updated Scénic and Grand Scénic were released in March 2013, which features a new interior and exterior styling and driver aids. At the same time, Renault introduced a crossover version of the Scénic, which was called the Scénic Xmod (Scenic Xmod Cross in Italy). The Scénic Xmod has different styling to the normal Scénic: larger and revised grille, roof racks, body protections, new tires and alloys, new paintwork and Xmod badges. It also features Renault Extended Grip enhanced traction control.

Both the Scénic and Grand Scénic can be specified with an Efficient Dual Clutch gearbox, mated to the 1.5dci 110 bhp (82 kW) engine.

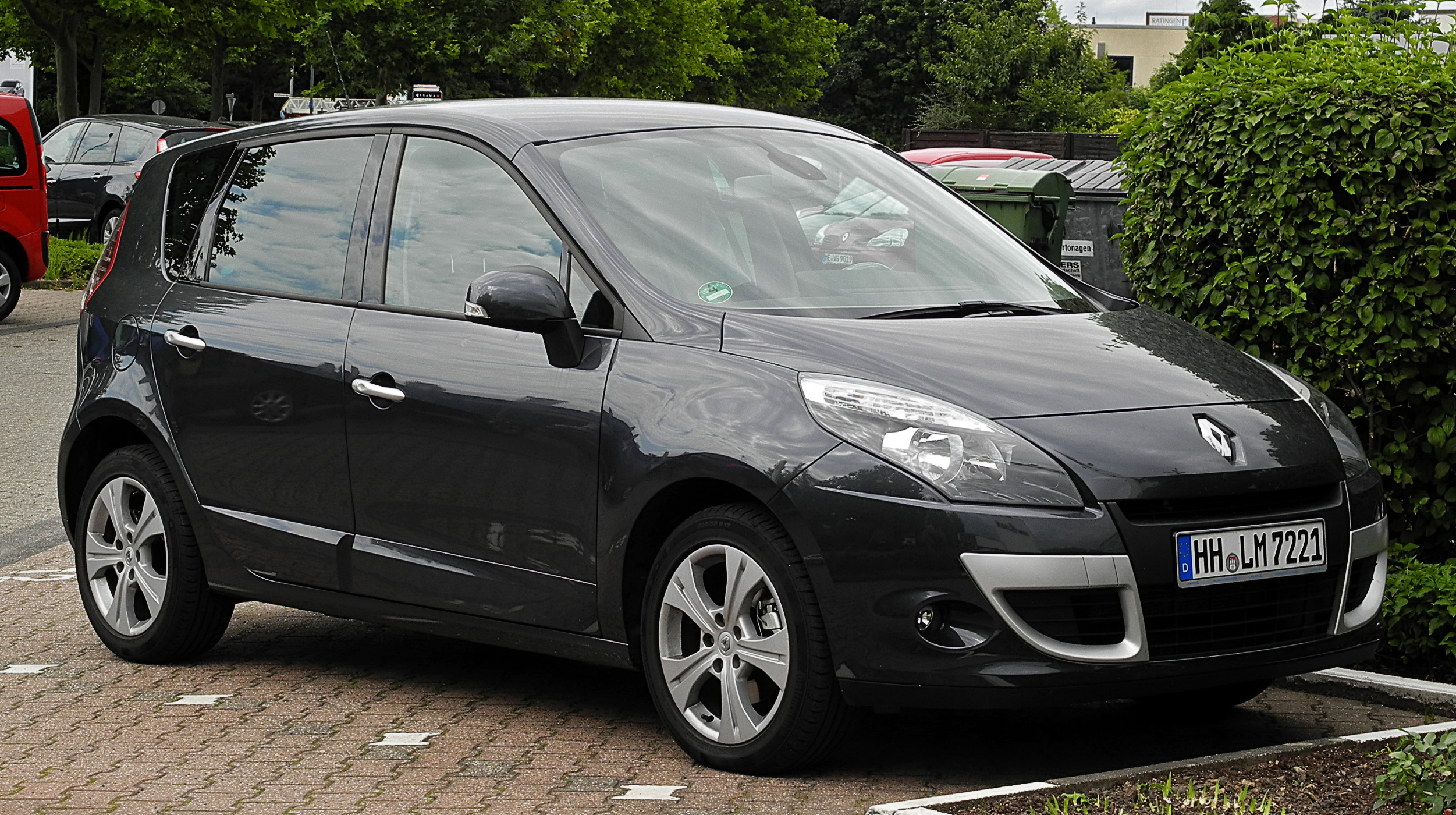
Pre-facelift

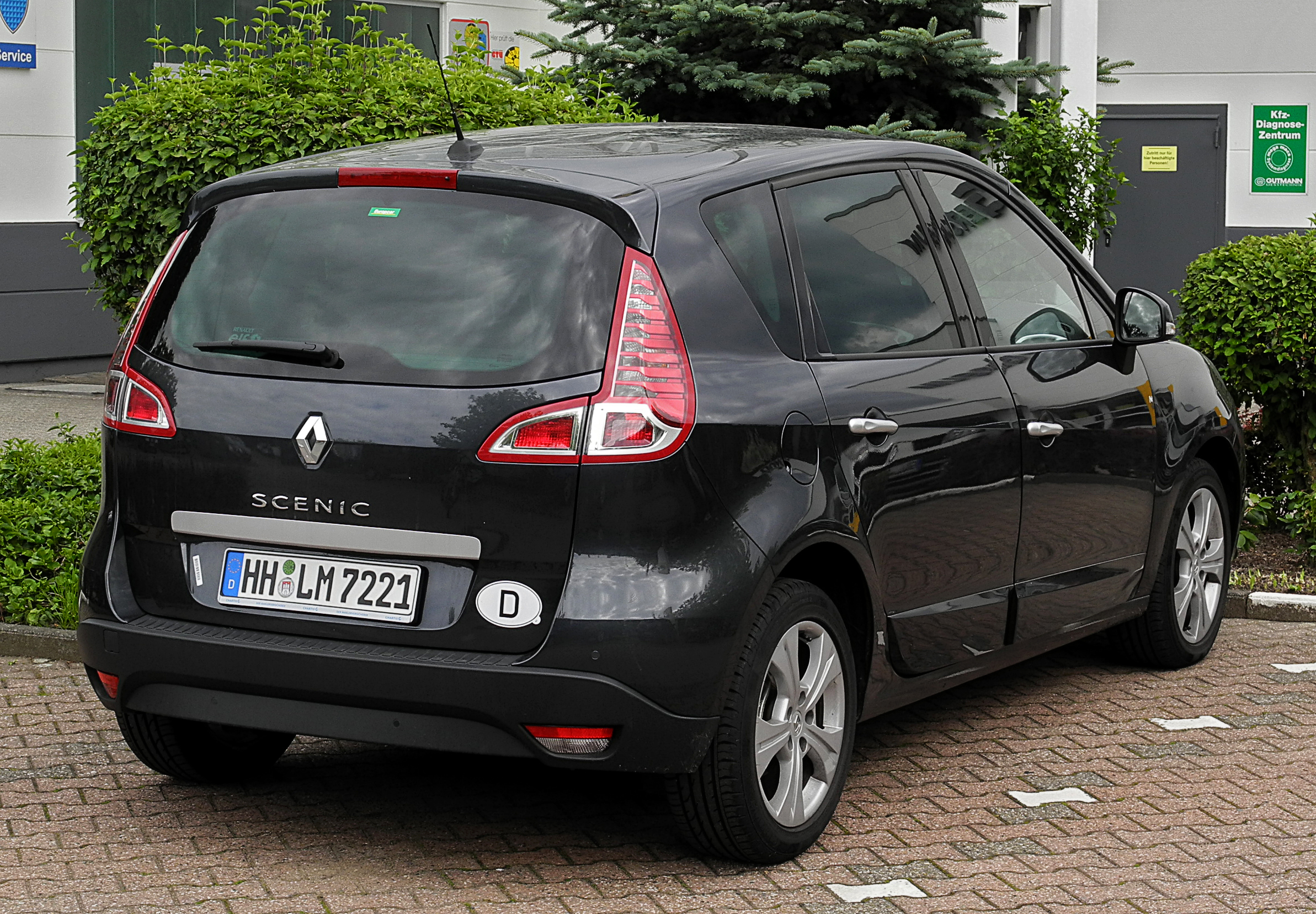
Pre-facelift

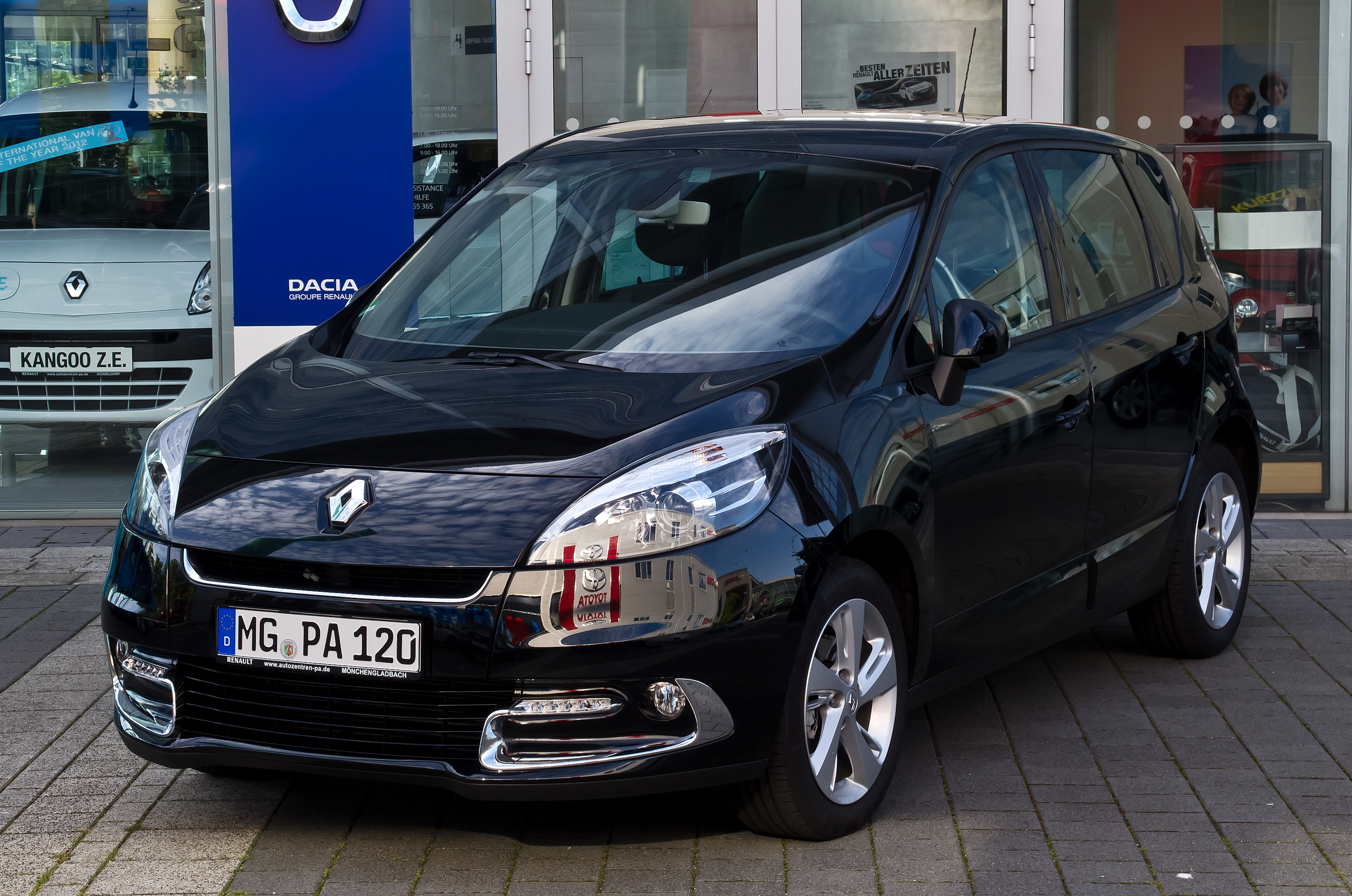
First facelift

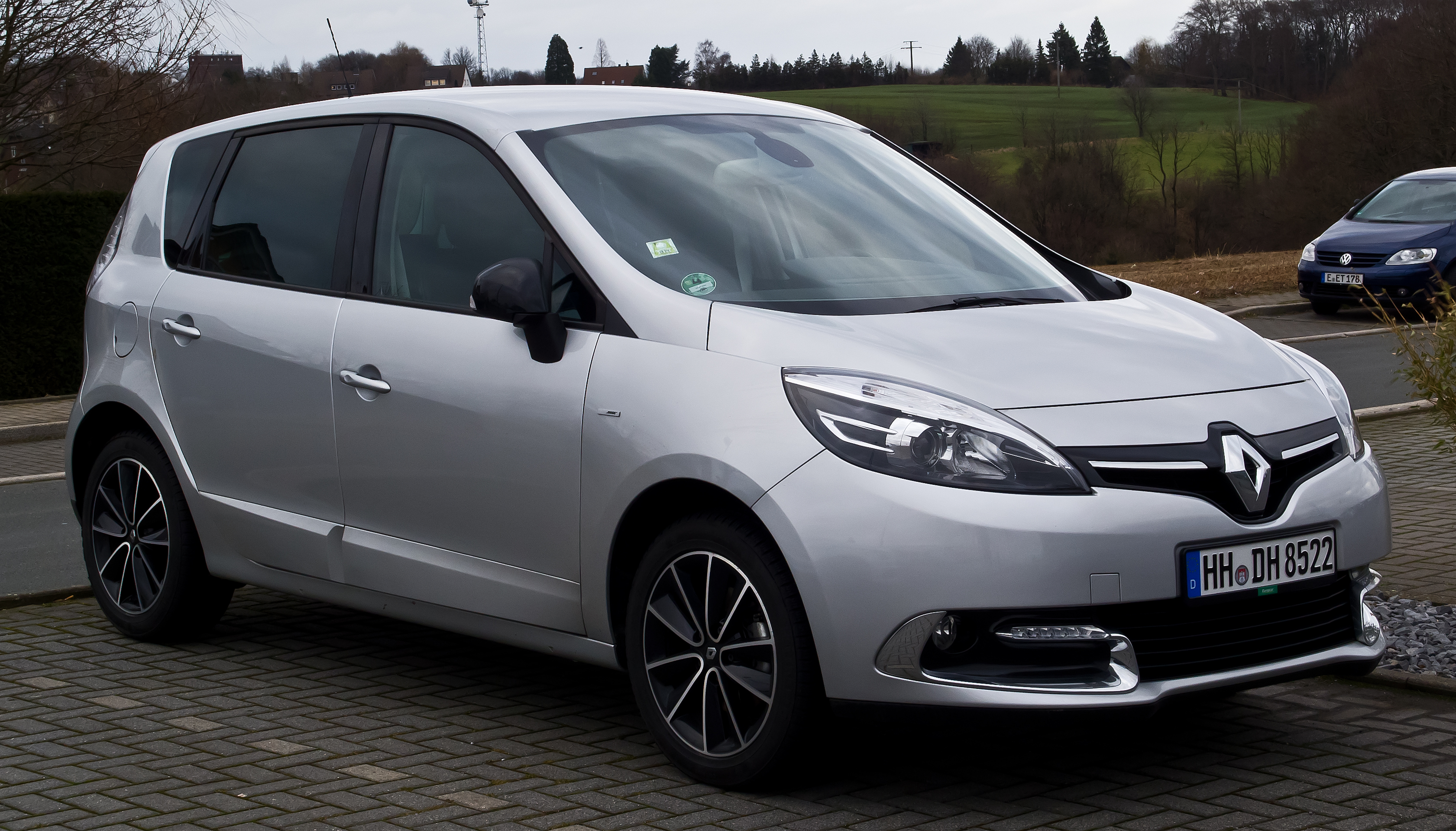
Second Facelift

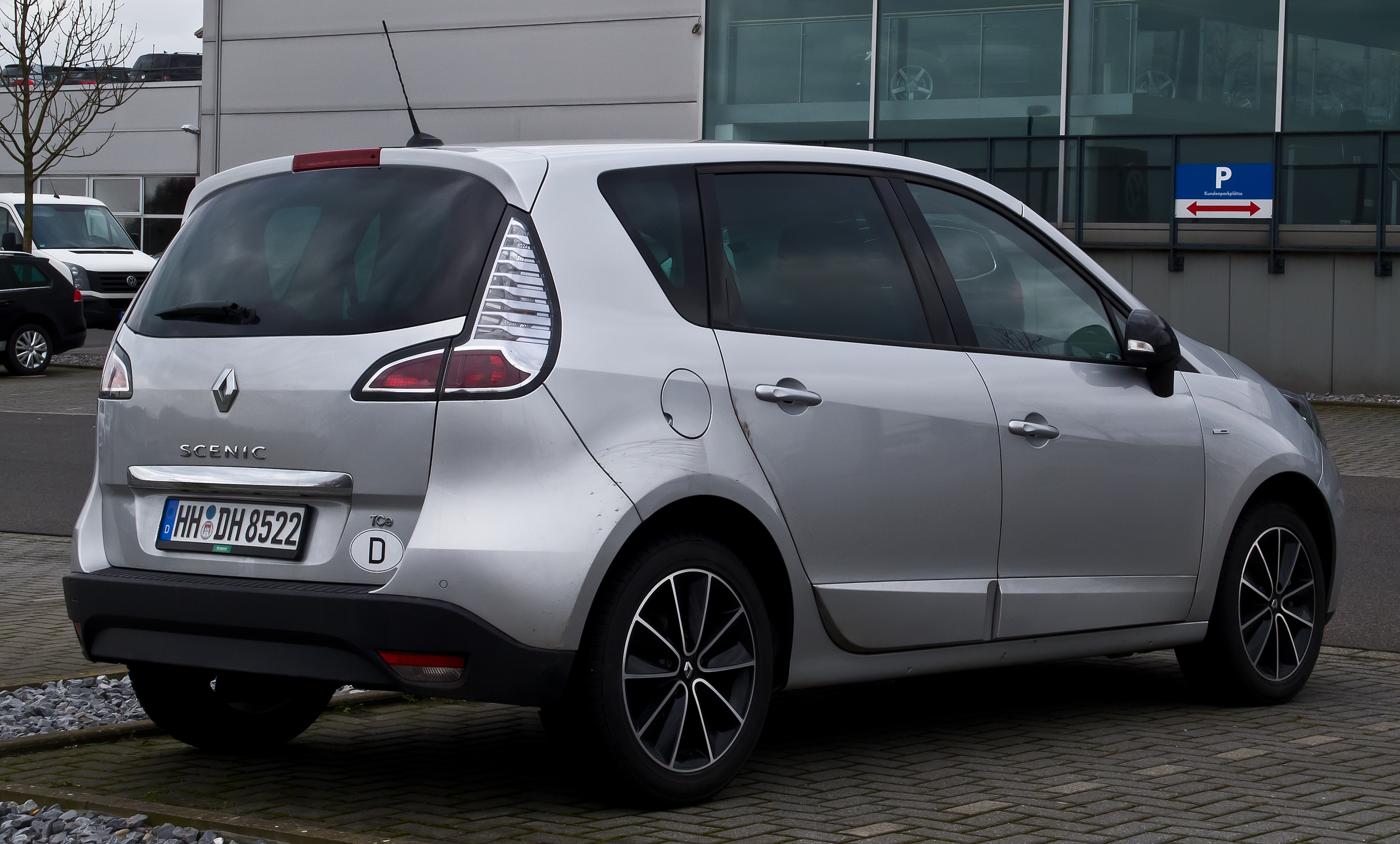
Second Facelift

== Fourth generation (2016) ==
Scénic IV
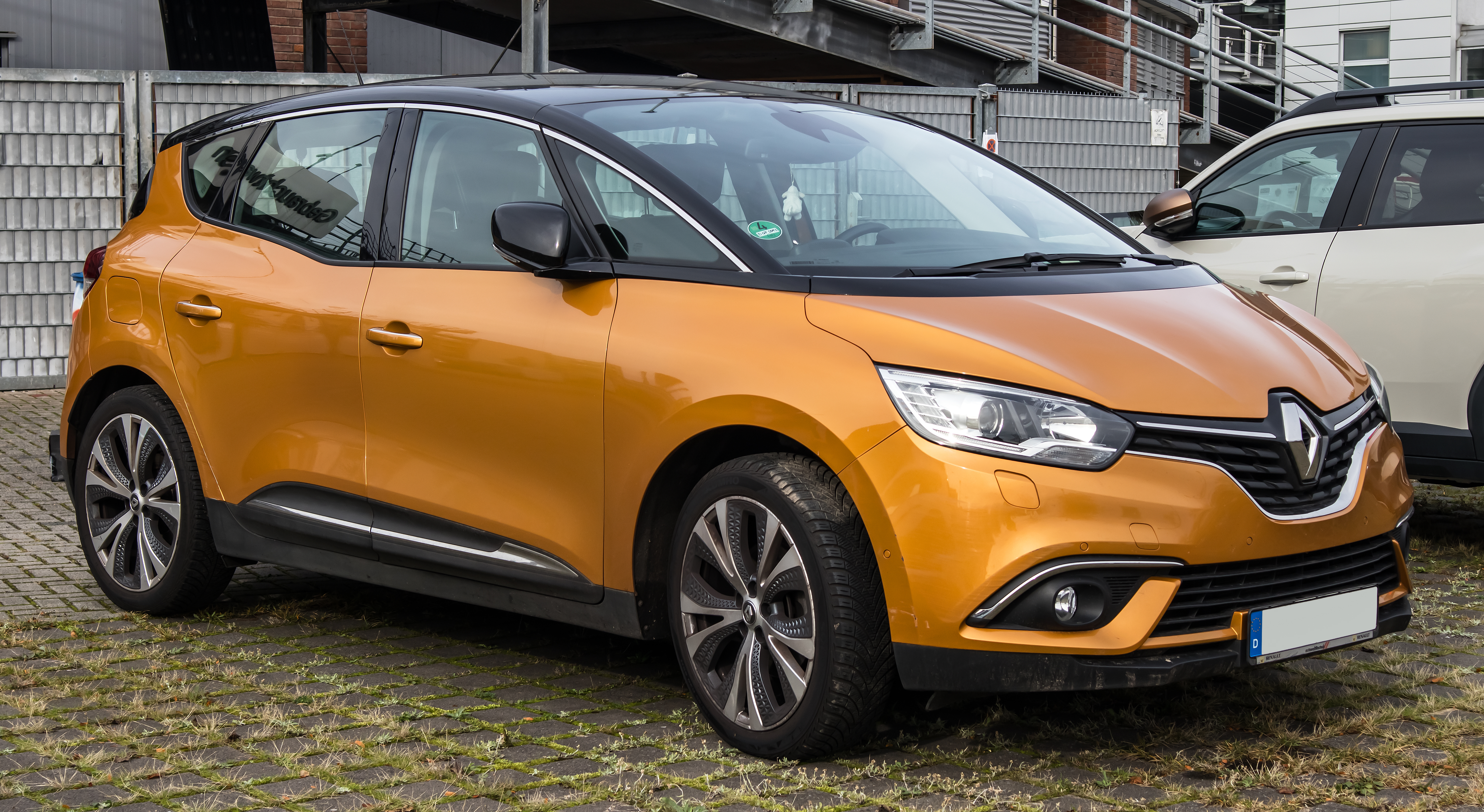

Overview
- Production: 2016–2022
- Assembly: France: Douai (Douai Factory)
- Designer: Jérémie Sommer (exterior); Maxime Pinol (interior)

Body and chassis
- Platform: Renault–Nissan CMF-CD platform
- Related: Renault Mégane; Renault Espace

Powertrain
- Engine: Petrol: 1.2 L H5Ft turbo I4; 1.3 L H5Ht turbo I4; Diesel: 1.5 L K9K I4; 1.6 L R9M I4; 1.7 L R9N I4
- Transmission: 6-speed manual; 6-speed automatic; 7-speed automatic

Dimensions
- Wheelbase: 2,734 mm (107.6 in); 2,804 mm (110.4 in) (Grand Scénic)
- Length: 4,406 mm (173.5 in); 4,634 mm (182.4 in) (Grand Scénic)
- Width: 1,865 mm (73.4 in); 1,865 mm (73.4 in) (Grand Scénic)
- Height: 1,653 mm (65.1 in); 1,660 mm (65.4 in) (Grand Scénic)

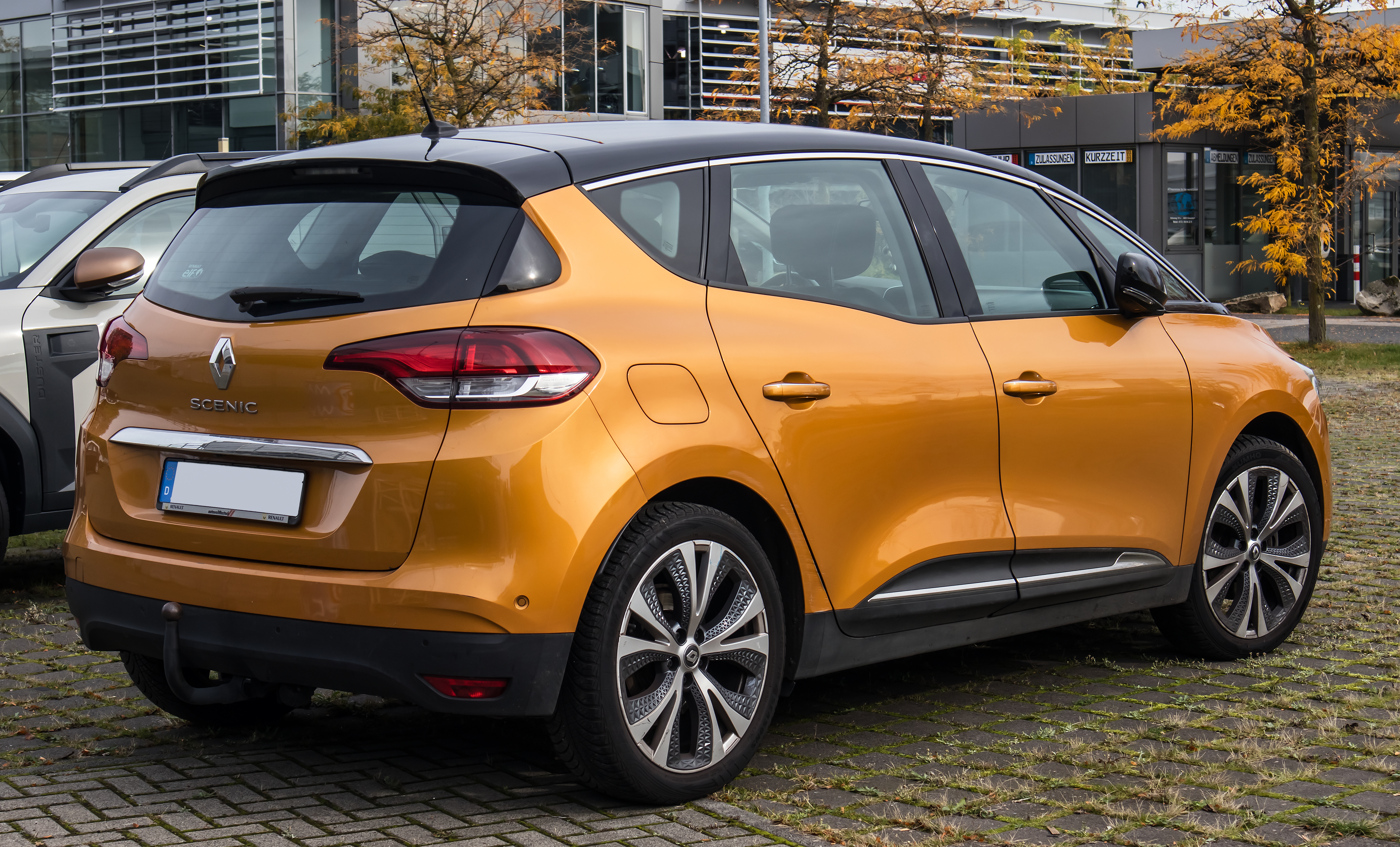
Scenic

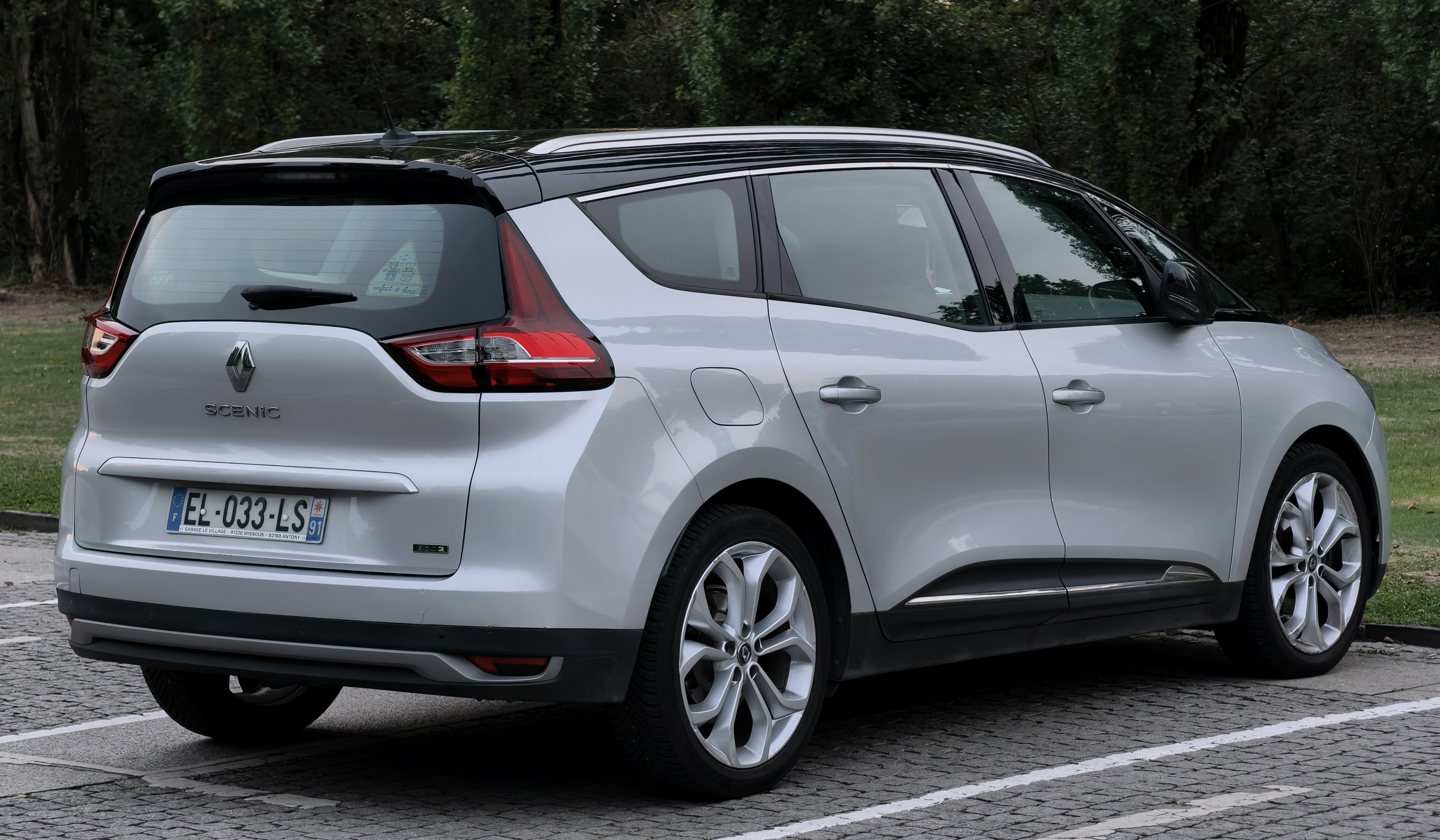
Grand Scenic

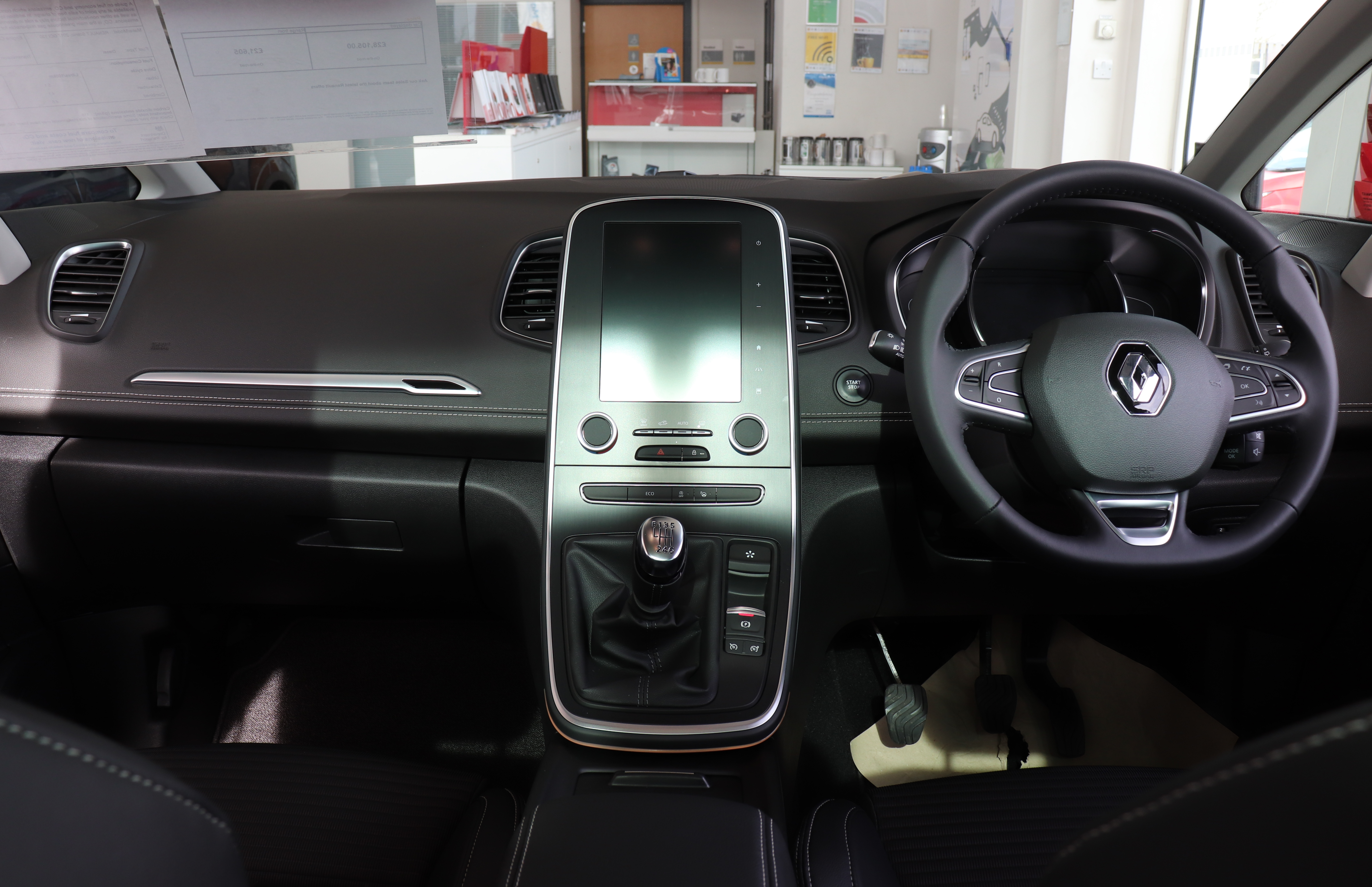
Interior

A fourth generation Scénic was unveiled at the 2016 Geneva Motor Show. The car, based on the R-Space concept, is slightly larger than its predecessor, and adds some crossover design elements but, according to Renault, it is still an MPV.

It is powered by six diesel and two petrol engines. For the models with six-speed manual transmission and Energy dCi 110 diesel engines, it will incorporate an optional hybrid unit (Hybrid Assist). The Scénic will be offered with manual or double clutch gear box. The Scénic offers a 572 dm^{3} (20.2 cu ft) trunk and the Grand Scénic 765 dm^{3} (27.0 cu ft) with five seats.

The Mk IV Scénic received a five star rating in Euro NCAP, with a range of standard active and passive safety features, including 'Active Emergency Braking System' with 'Pedestrian Detection' making the Renault Scénic the only compact MPV with this feature as standard.

The Scénic also features 'Lane Keeping Assist' and 'Fatigue Detection Alert'. Above 50 km/h (31 mph), the Scénic can detect fatigue associated driving and alerts the driver, if the driver does not react, it is able to correct the trajectory autonomously.

In May 2022, Renault announced the short-body Scénic is to be discontinued, a few months before the Grand Scénic. The short-body Scénic production was stopped in July 2022, after 190,636 units produced.

== Fifth generation (Scenic E-Tech, 2024) ==
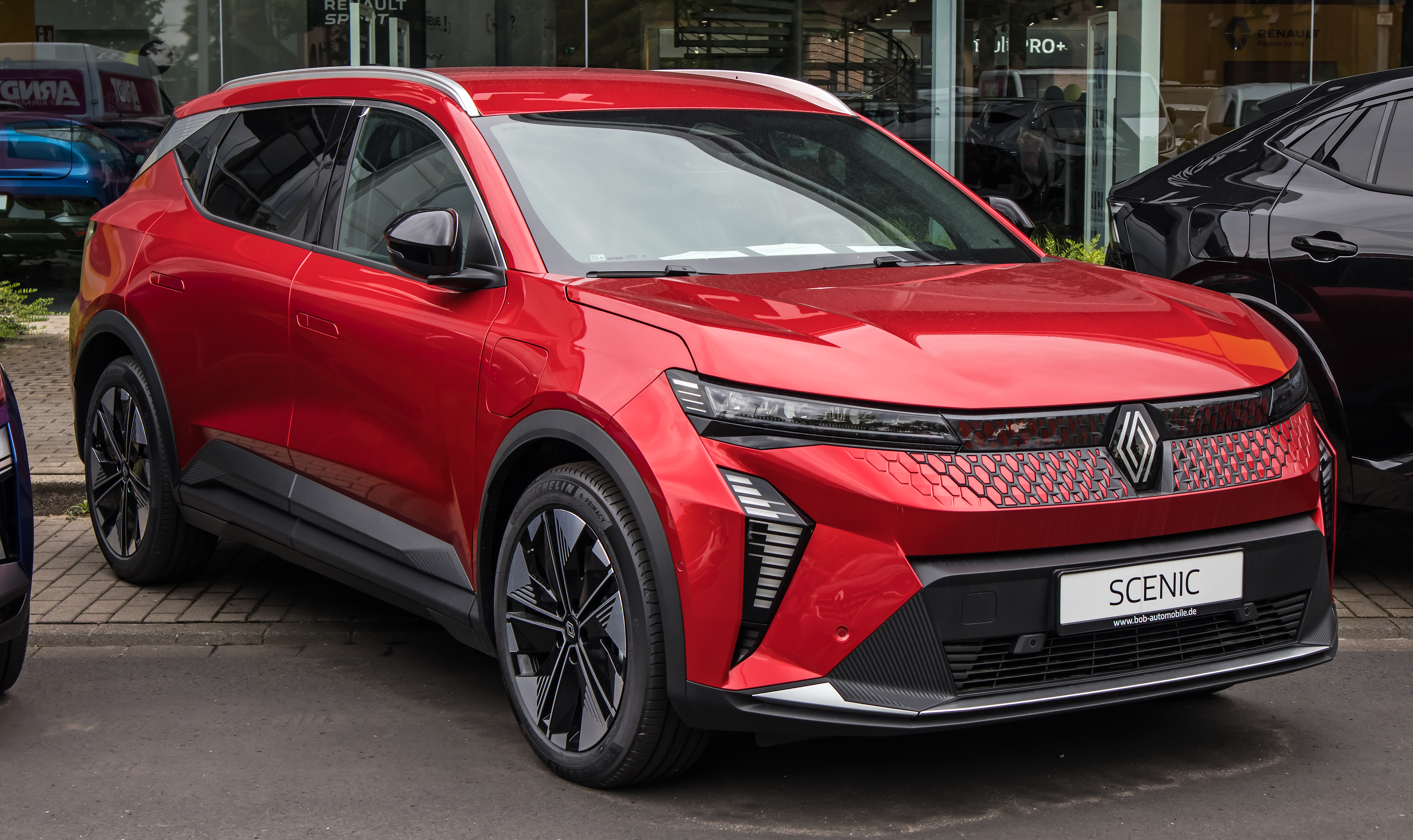
Renault Scenic E-Tech

The Scenic E-Tech is a battery electric car using the Scenic nameplate that was launched in 2024.

== Scénic in the United Kingdom ==
Sales of the Scénic in the United Kingdom began in May 1997, and for the first two years, the Scénic was the only compact MPV sold by a mainstream manufacturer in the United Kingdom, however the Vauxhall Zafira, Citroën Xsara Picasso, Fiat Multipla and the Nissan Almera Tino were launched in less than five years. In 1997, the Mégane Scénic was awarded the Car of the Year by What Car?.

The Scénic II arrived in showrooms in the country in September 2003. The Scénic III arrived in showrooms in the country in May 2009. The Scénic IV arrived in showrooms in the end of 2016 and UK sales were ended completely in 2019 due to declining popularity of MPVs there.

In October 2014, Top Gear Magazine placed the Scénic XMOD on its list of The Worst Cars You Can Buy Right Now. The facelifted versions could be specified with the R Link touchscreen system, that includes a digital radio.

== Scénic in Australia ==
Sales of the Scénic in Australia began in 2001 alongside the Scenic RX4, Clio, and Megane Convertible. Sales of the Scenic were weak and as such the Scenic RX4 was introduced to compete with crossovers such as the Toyota RAV4 and Honda CRV. Although demand for crossovers was large, the RX4 failed to gain much popularity and ended up selling a total of 418 units from 2001 to 2003.

The Scénic II arrived in showrooms in Australia in 2004 after the discontinuation of the Scenic I and Scenic RX4. The Scenic II was sold from 2004-2010, but sales were poor, especially since the introduction of the Koleos to the market in 2008. As such, in 2010 Renault Australia announced it would not be bringing the Scenic III to Australia. When the Scenic IV was announced in 2016, Renault Australia again announced it had no plans of bringing the model to the country with strong sales of the Koleos and Captur. As of 2024, Renault Australia sell exclusively SUV’s and vans, these models being the Koleos, Captur, Arkana, Megane E-tech, Kangoo, Trafic, and Master.

== Recall ==
Electronic defects have caused Renault to issue two recalls. The first, in October 2009, was because of the dashboard could stop functioning, leaving drivers without the ability to gauge their speed, fuel tank, direction indicators or anything as all instruments were totally electronic.

At first drivers had to replace this part at their own expense, but eventually, because of media pressure, Renault UK and Ireland said that they would reimburse customers up to a set limit. No reimburse was implemented by Renault in Finland where several independent workshops launched an affordable priced fixing of blanked Scénic panels.

The cause of the unexpected instrument panel blankening originated from some defective soldering which caused the power transistor to overheat and fail. The fault occurred in Scénic II cars made between 2003 and 2006. The second, in August 2010, was because the electric handbrake could sometimes engage on its own while the car was in motion.

== Alternative propulsion ==
The Cleanova III, presented in the 2005 Geneva Auto Show, is based on a Scénic platform.

== Sales ==
Year	Brazil
2003	11,526
2004	10,937
2005	9,008
2006	5,637
2007	4,623
2008	4,153
2009	2,594
2010	1,537
2011	27

== See also ==
- Renault Modus, the mini MPV of the manufacturer
- Renault Espace, the large MPV of the manufacturer
