= Michelotti Shellette =

Coachbuilt car with wicker seats

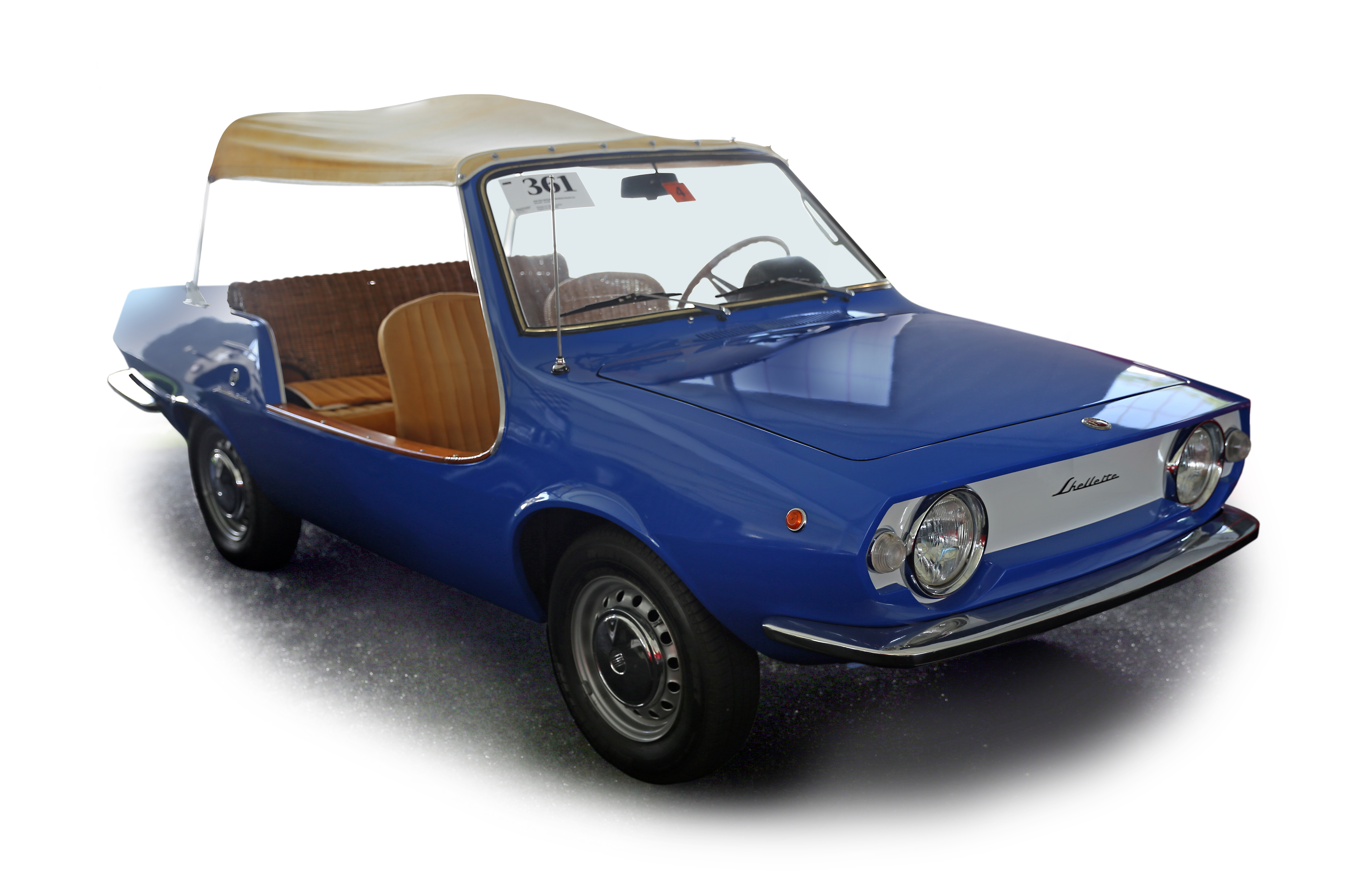
- Michelotti Shellette

Overview
- Manufacturer: Giovanni Michelotti
- Production: 1968–1972
- Designer: Giovanni Michelotti

Body and chassis
- Class: Supermini (B)
- Body style: topless beach car
- Layout: RR layout (Fiat); FR layout (Daf); FF layout (BMC)
- Platform: Fiat 850; DAF 33; BMC ADO16

Powertrain
- Engine: 843 cc OHV I4 (Fiat); 844 cc flat twin (Daf); 1275 cc OHV I4 (BMC)
- Transmission: 4-speed manual (Fiat, BMC); Variomatic (Daf)

Dimensions
- Wheelbase: 2,027 mm (79.8 in) (Fiat); 2,050 mm (80.7 in) (Daf); 2,375 mm (93.5 in) (BMC)
- Length: 3,870 mm (152.4 in)
- Width: 1,525 mm (60.0 in)
- Height: 1,310 mm (51.6 in)
- Curb weight: ca. 650-700 kg (1433-1543 lb)

The Michelotti Shellette or Spiaggetta was a beach car based on various compact car platforms. The automobile was designed by Giovanni Michelotti and debuted officially at the 1968 Geneva Motor Show. It was built in a small production run in the next few years. The model name Shellette refers to Philip Schell, a yacht builder who initiated the project.

== Development ==
The concept of the Italian beach car (spiaggetta or spiaggina, from spiaggia - Italian for beach) came about in the early 1950s. Most likely the original idea was from Gianni Agnelli.

Since 1954, various Italian coachbuilders had designed open vehicles, mostly without any doors and based on Fiat models, the majority of which remained one-offs. In 1957, Pininfarina built some beach cars by the name Eden Roc for Gianni Agnelli and Henry Ford II, based on the Fiat 600 Multipla. Other one-offs came from Fissore (Marinella), Savio and Vignale. Luigi Segre, the owner of Carrozzeria Ghia, was the first to acknowledge the market potential for such a car and had his designer Sergio Sartorelli develop a light beach construction to be produced in larger numbers. Sartorelli designed an open car with a large number of stock components, that could be built on the basis of the Fiat 500 as well as the Fiat 600. Those cars were built between 1957 and 1966 at Ghia and OSI, and were sold under the names Fiat 500 Jolly and 600 Jolly.

In 1967, yacht designer Phillipe Schell (son of Lucy O'Reilly Schell, brother of Harry Schell) commissioned a new design for a beach car at the Turin design studio Michelotti, that should refine and stylistically modernize the Jolly concept.

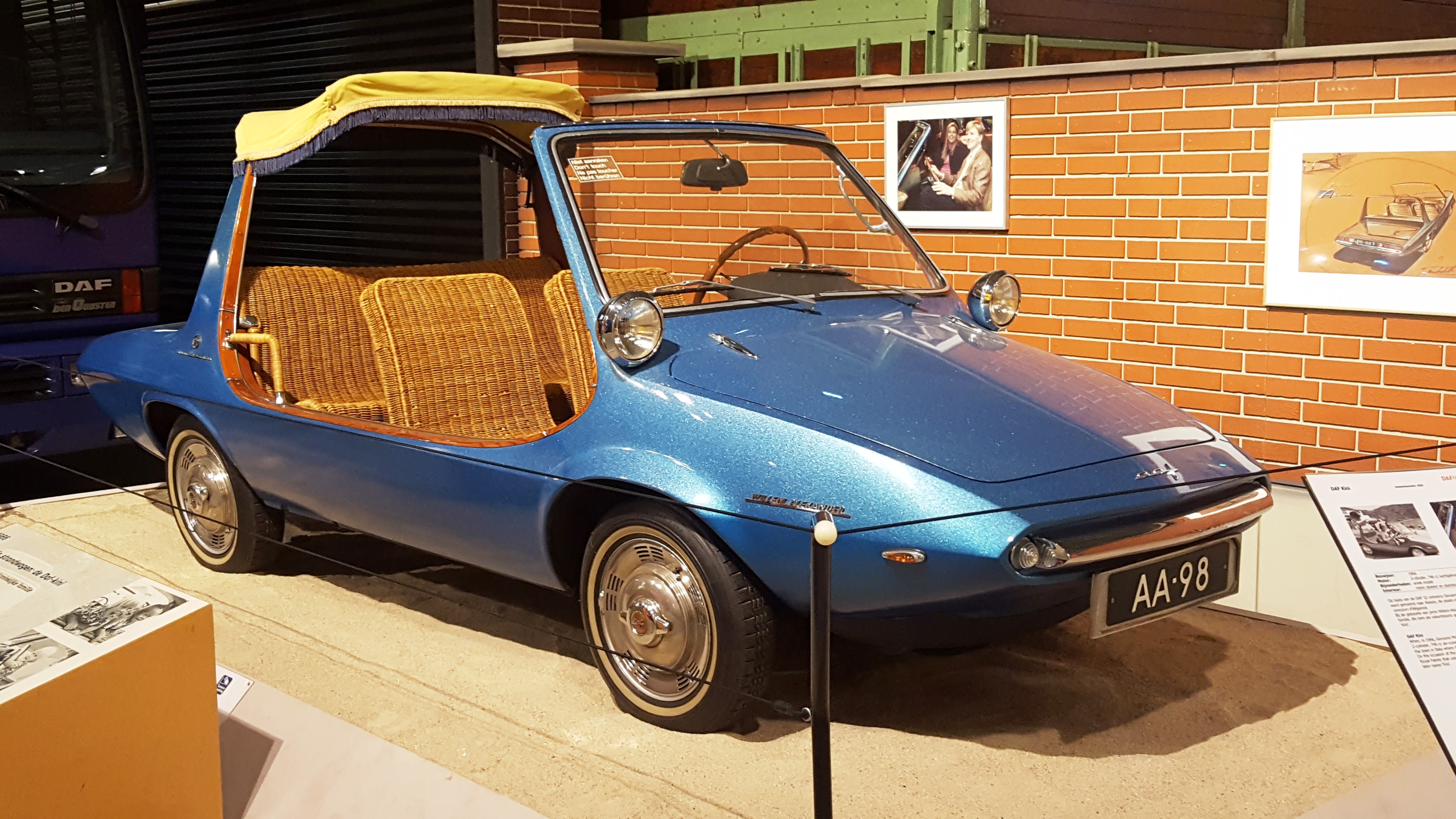
Daf-Michelotti Kini with Dutch royal license plate

At the Concorso d'Eleganza in Alassio, Michelotti had already presented a beach car on a Daf 32 basis, named Michelotti Alassio. It won first prize. This vehicle was renamed Kini and offered to the Dutch royal family in 1967 on the occasion of the birth of the next heir to the throne, Willem-Alexander; the family proceeded to use it for years at its vacation home in Porto Ercole (Tuscany). The Kini remained a one-off, but its lines, especially of the low cut entry opening on the sides, influenced Michelotti's later design for Schell. The Shellette, as this car would be named, differed from the Kini at the front and rear end, and with regards to its mechanics, because it was to be built on the rear engined Fiat 850 Special platform, whereas the Daf had a front engine, rear drive set-up.

The Shellette was one of the few cars that Michelotti built and marketed under its own brand name. Apart from Shellette, the car can also be found wearing Spiaggetta emblems.

== Model description ==
The Michelotti Shellette was a topless car with four seats, metal body, no doors and half open sides.

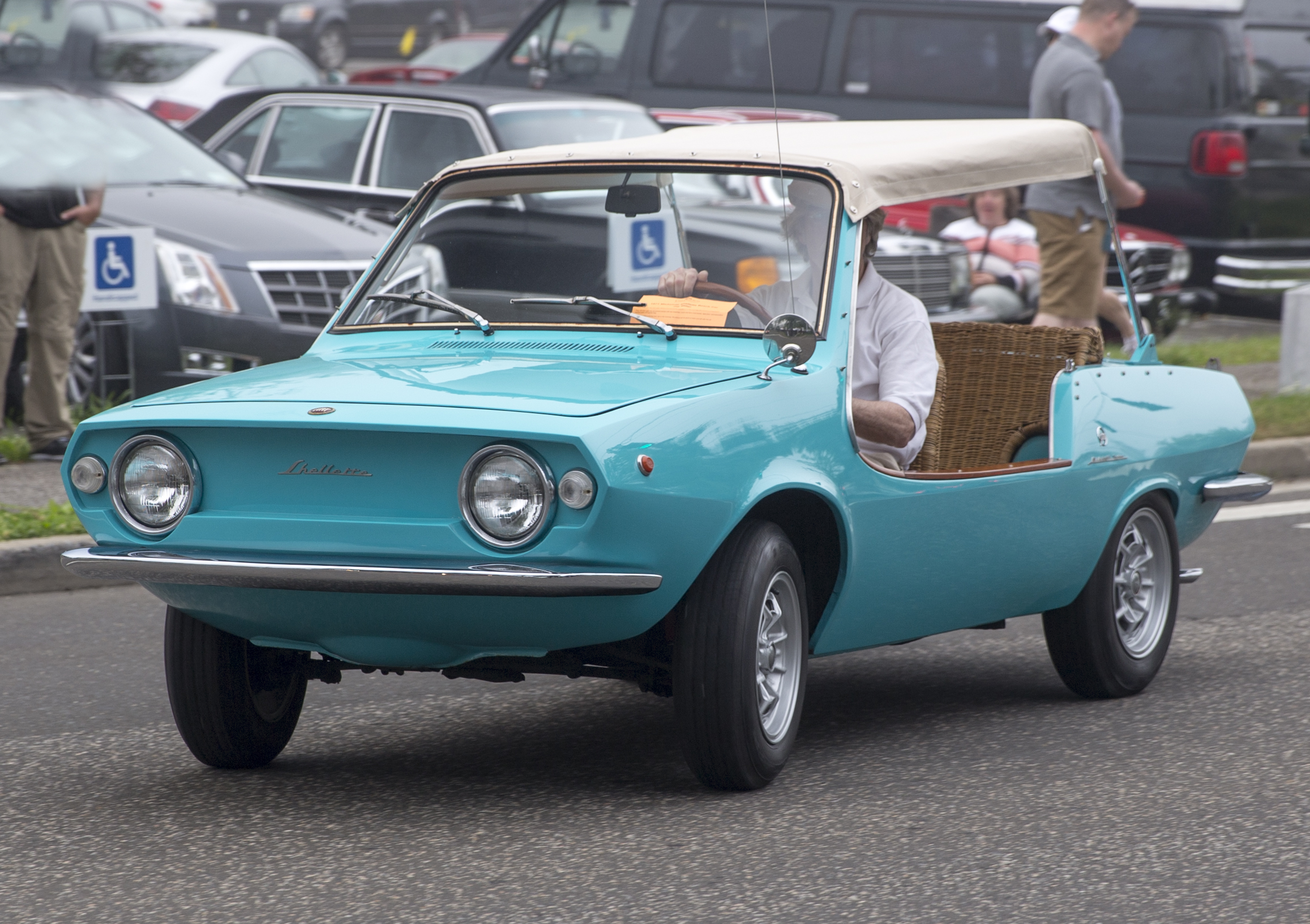
Fiat-Michelotti Shellette

Instead of the doors, the Shellette had deep cutouts in the flanks that ran from the front to the back seats. Instead of a roof, there was a simple canvas cover on a foldable metal frame (much like a bimini top for small boats). There was no side protection. The windshield was fixed and could not fold down unlike many other models in this segment such as the Savio Jungla and the Citroën Méhari. The front of the Shellette showed two round headlights, the rear resembled that of the Fiat 850 Spider, but had the round lights of the 850 coach model. In the front there were two seats, in the rear was one bench. All seats were made of wicker, as they also were in the Ghia Jolly models based on the Fiat 500 and 600. Also the Shellette dashboard was made of wicker, with an instrument panel and vent openings inserted. The interior was finished with wood panels and trim in various places.

The technical basis of the 'regular' Shellette was the Fiat 850 Special, of which Michelotti used the platform, suspension and engine. The latter had an 843 cc capacity and produced 47 PS (35 kW; 46 hp). It was positioned behind the rear axle and drove the rear wheels via a manual 4-speed gearbox.

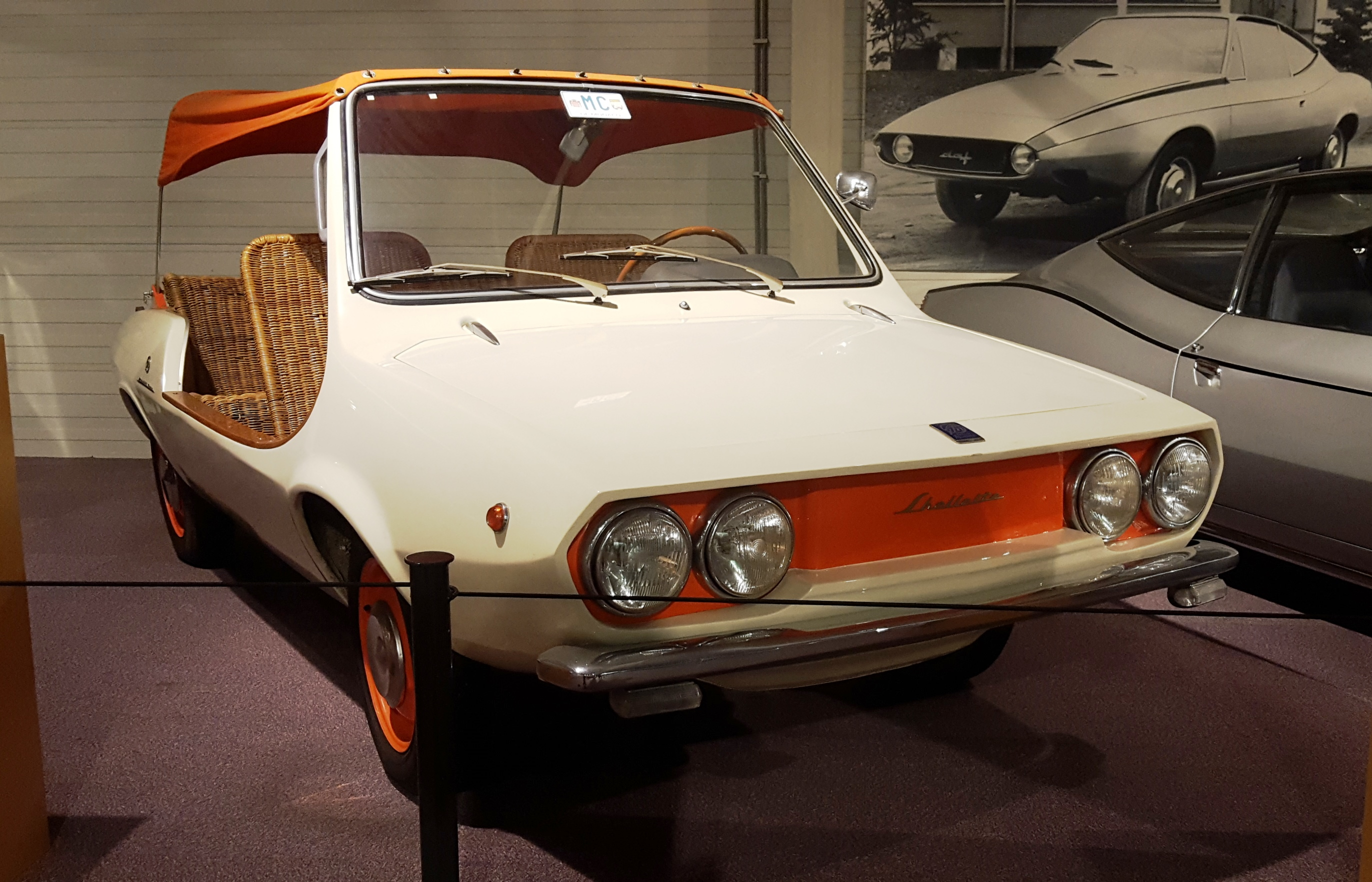
Daf-Michelotti Shellette, formerly owned by Onassis

A Daf Shellette could be distinguished from the Fiat Shellette by its double headlights and Alfa Romeo Giulia rear lights.

The Daf version was based on the Daf 33 platform, but had the larger 844 cc 2-cylinder air cooled engine of the Daf 44 in front of the car, with 34 PS (25 kW; 34 hp).

== Production ==
The regular Fiat 850 Michelotti Shellette was produced from 1968 into the early 1970s. The company was first and foremost a design studio and didn't have a workshop until 1959, mainly for building prototypes. In 1967, it opened its own carrozzeria in Orbassano, near Turin. Possibly that is where it produced the Shellettes.

Most sources speak of some 80 vehicles in total. That number includes the Daf Kini and a couple of Shellettes based on the Daf 33 platform, plus at least one based on the BMC 1100 platform, which was a prototype made by Michelotti in an attempt to sell the concept to BLMC Australia. The BMC prototype has a steel body and can be easily identified because it has rectangular headlights as on the Triumph Toledo and centrally placed instrumentation as known of the 1970 Morris 1100.

== Famous users ==
Apart from the Dutch royal family and Gianni Agnelli there were more well-known Michelotti Shellette users.

One of the Shellettes with Daf 44 underpinnings was especially ordered in 1968 by Aristoteles Onassis (because it had automatic Variomatic transmission), who used it in Monte Carlo to court his future wife Jackie and on his private island Skorpios (Greece); he also took it with him when traveling on his yacht.

The 'Onassis car' had a special feature because Onassis and his wife enjoyed breakfast at the beach: the wicker 'glove box' could be taken out of the dashboard and then function as a bread basket. A 1969 brochure also shows a wicker basket in front of the transmission lever.

One of the Fiat 850 Shellettes originally belonged to architect Philippe Starck, who sold it in 2014. Another known former Fiat 850 Shellette owner was Ringo Starr.

== Current situation ==
The Daf Kini and ex-Onassis Daf Shellette are at the Daf Museum in Eindhoven (Netherlands). Another Daf Shellette is in a collection in the USA. A Fiat 850 Shellette is at the Louwman Museum in The Hague (Netherlands); this was one of two owned by industrial Simon Kingston from Santa Barbara (CA). Sometimes a Fiat Shellette shows up at an auction. The BMC version now spends its days in Switzerland.

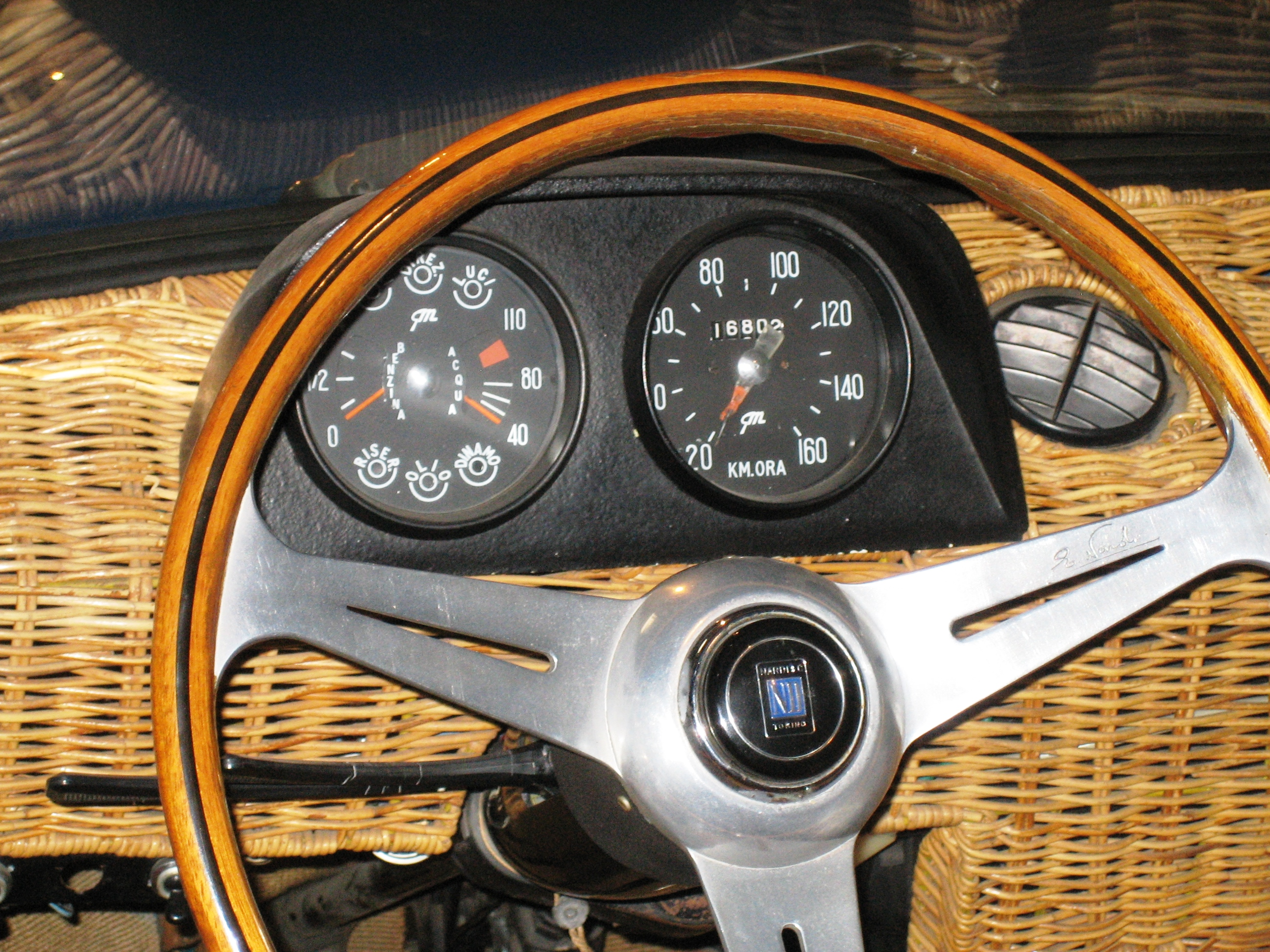
Instrument panel and Nardi steering wheel Fiat-Michelotti Shellette

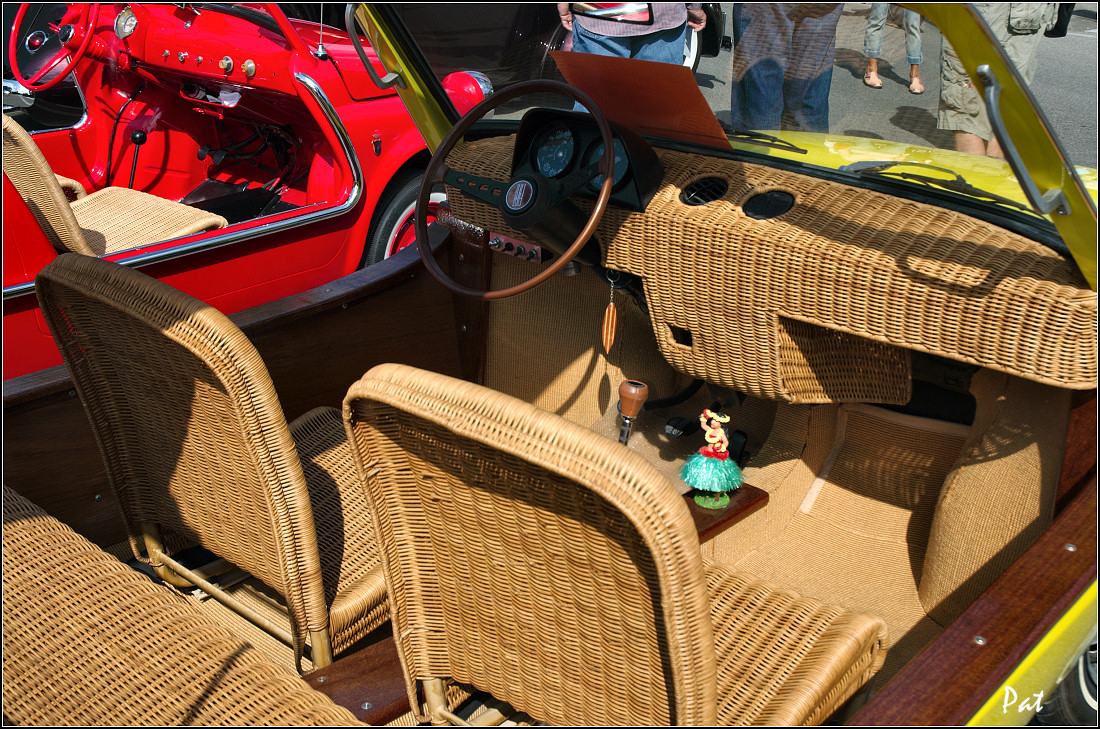
Wicker and wooden interior Fiat-Michelotti Shellette
