= Hub van Doorne =

Dutch businessman (1900–1979)

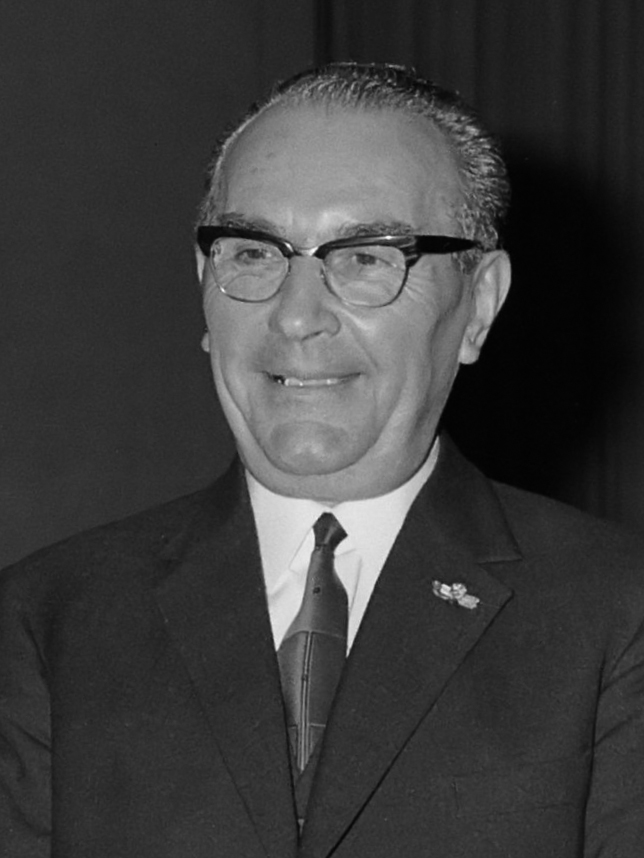
Huub van Doorne (1965)

Hubert Jozef ("Hub") van Doorne (Note: In this Dutch name, the surname is Van Doorne, not Doorne.) (1 January 1900 – 23 May 1979) was a Dutch industrialist. Together with his brother Willem (Wim) van Doorne, he founded the trailer and truck manufacturer DAF Trucks.

== Early years ==
Van Doorne was born in the small Dutch town by the name America, in Dutch Limburg, the son of blacksmith Martin van Doorne (1870–1912) by his marriage to Petronella Vervoort (1866–1952). In March 1912 the family moved to Deurne, where Van Doorne's father died soon after. Van Doorne Was Catholics.

Van Doorne was keen to take on his father's business, but was considered too young: instead he became an apprentice in the small Mandiger machine factory of nearby Eindhoven.

== Early career ==
After the First World War Van Doorne was employed as a chauffeur-mechanic by a well-known local doctor named Hendrik Wiegersma. Subsequently, he worked for the De Valk brewery. In 1920 he established his own business concentrating on metal working involving items such as stoves, bicycles and motor vehicles. However, he gave up on this business after four years and returned to Mandiger's as company manager.

== Van Doorne's Aanhangwagenfabriek N.V. and its successor ==
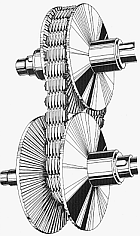
Belt and pulleys of a Van Doorne transmission

With financial support from the brewery by whom he had been employed ten years earlier, Van Doorne returned to self-employment in April 1928, establishing his own metal based manufacturing and repair business, concentrating on items such as cabinets, ladders, window frames and, increasingly, trailers which led to the business being renamed in 1932 to Van Doorne's Aanhangwagenfabriek (DAF). Although the business initially employed just four people, including Hub and his brother Wim, in just one year it expanded to the point where it employed 30 people. The business subsequently expanded into truck production and, during the Second World War, production of military vehicles. It was on account of the move into powered vehicles that the firm's name was changed again, to Van Doorne's Automobielfabriek (DAF).

The business evolved as a partnership between Hub and Wim, with Hub retaining responsibility for technical and engineering aspects of the business and Wim looking after the financial and administrative aspects. It was Hub who would develop and apply the concept of continuously variable transmission for which the firm would become well known in the 1950s and 1960s. Their Van Doorne transmission, using a belt drive between two adjustable coned pulleys, was widely used as the Variomatic in small DAF cars.

== Personal ==
Van Doorne married on 15 July 1929, Henrica Maria Reijnders (1905–1987), daughter of a substantial local retailer. She would later receive papal commendation for her energetic work in the social field. The couple produced five recorded children.

For a time, the Van Doorne family lived in Eindhoven, but they soon returned to Deurne, and were still living there when Hub died in 1979. He was buried at the local Jacobshof cemetery where today his body lies in a protected area beside those of his wife and three of his children Anny (1930–2004), Jeffrey (1932–2006) and Piet (1934–1982).

== Sources and further reading ==
This entry includes information from the equivalent entry in the Dutch Wikipedia.
