= DAF 600 =

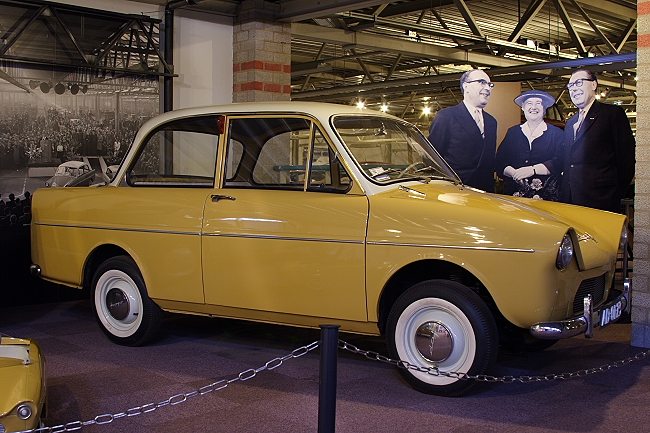

Overview
- Manufacturer: DAF
- Production: 1959–1963; 30,591 produced
- Assembly: Netherlands: Eindhoven
- Designer: Johan van der Brugghen

Body and chassis
- Class: Small family car
- Body style: Saloon
- Layout: FR layout

Powertrain
- Engine: 590 cc (36.0 cu in) I2
- Transmission: Variomatic

Dimensions
- Wheelbase: 2,050 mm (80.7 in)
- Length: 3,610 mm (142.1 in)
- Height: 1,440 mm (56.7 in)

Chronology
- Successor: DAF 750

The DAF 600 is a small family car produced by Dutch automaker DAF from 1959 until 1963. It was DAF's first production passenger car. The 600 was first presented at the Amsterdam Motor Show in February 1958 and was in production by 1959, although the firm had published the first details of the car at the end of 1957.

== Manufacture ==
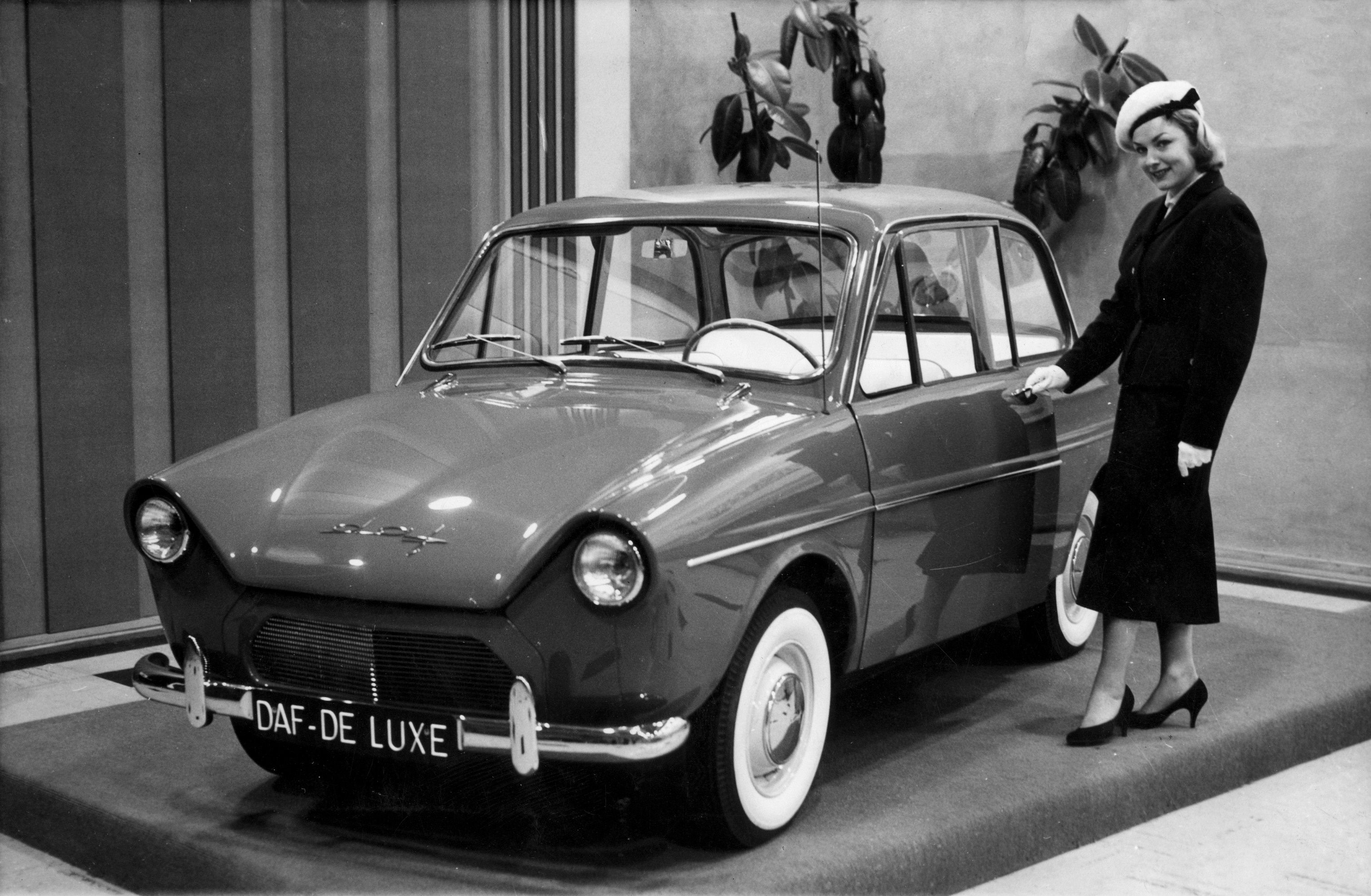
Exhibited as the "DAF De Luxe" at a car show in Eindhoven, the Netherlands, 2 February 1958

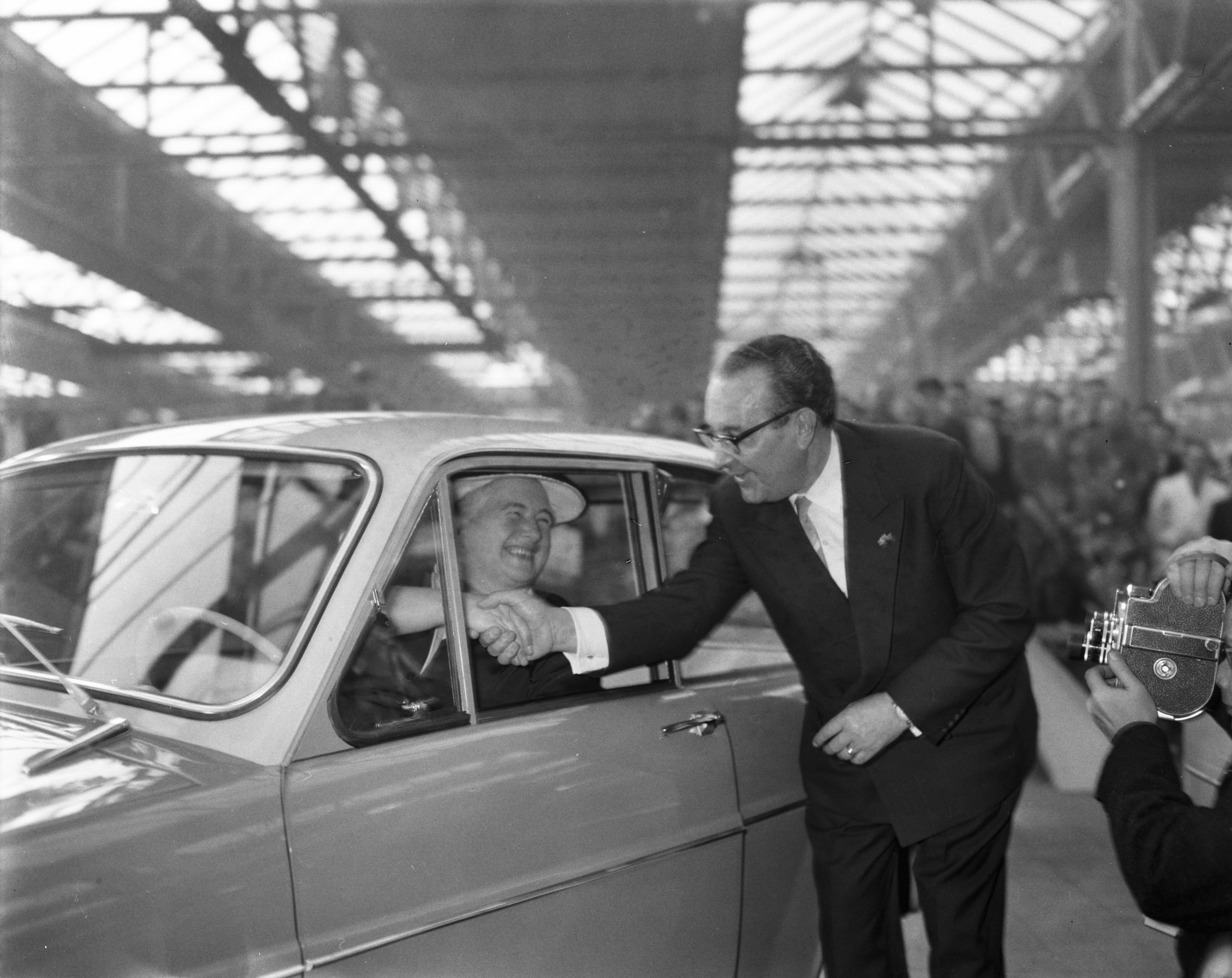
Mayor Truus Smulders-Beliën in one of the first DAF 600s

In 1959 the first two DAF 600 cars manufactured were awarded to the first Dutch woman to be a mayor, Truus Smulders-Beliën, and the chair of the Dutch automobile club. Smulders-Beliën been chosen because she was well known and she appeared to have ordered one. She was contacted and she agreed after it was realised that it was her staff who had ordered it. She was unaware of the order and the mayor did not have a driving licence.

From 1959 till 1963, a total of 30,591 cars were produced. The engine was an in-house development, an air-cooled, four-stroke, flat-twin petrol engine displacing 590 cc (36.0 cu in). Maximum power is 22 hp (16.2 kW) at 4,000 rpm. Larger displacement versions were later developed and this engine remained available in DAFs until the DAF 46 was discontinued in 1976.

== Variomatic transmission ==
The 600 was the first production car, after the 1920s Clyno, to have a continuously variable transmission (CVT) system - the innovative DAF Variomatic. The DAF Variomatic employs engine speed, via centrifugal weights, to shift the transmission and is enhanced by an engine manifold vacuum. It is the only car ever produced which went faster by the simple expedient of gently and gradually releasing the accelerator once top speed had been reached – this increased manifold vacuum which helped the variable pulleys shift to an even higher ratio so even though the engine speed stays the same, the transmission increases the car's speed, in the case of the DAF 600, from 60 miles per hour (97 km/h) to nearly 70 mph (110 km/h) given enough time and level road.

The Variomatic also permitted increased engine braking by operating a switch on the dashboard which reversed the action of the vacuum on the pulley's diaphragm, seeking a lower ratio with increased manifold vacuum.

== Gallery ==
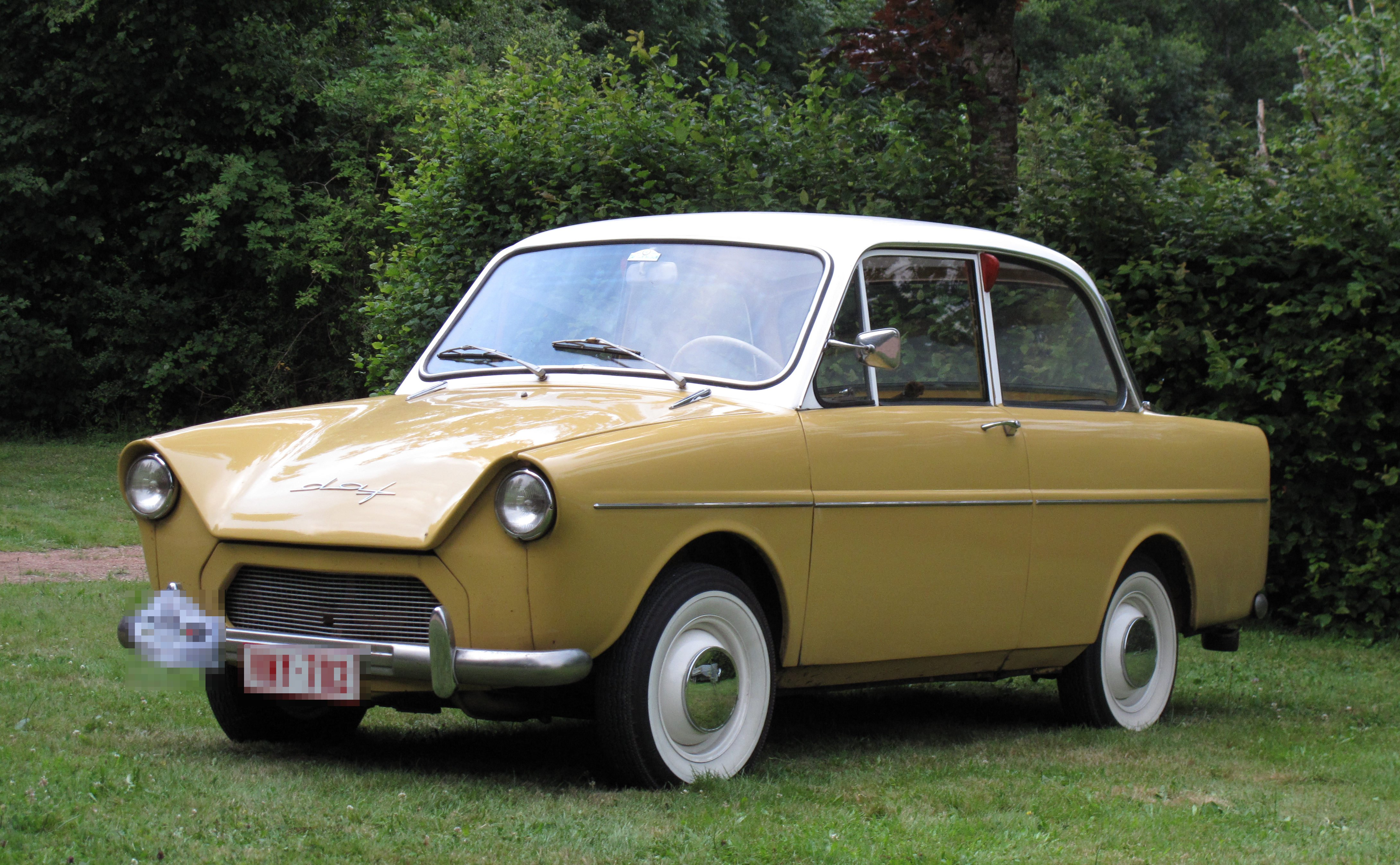

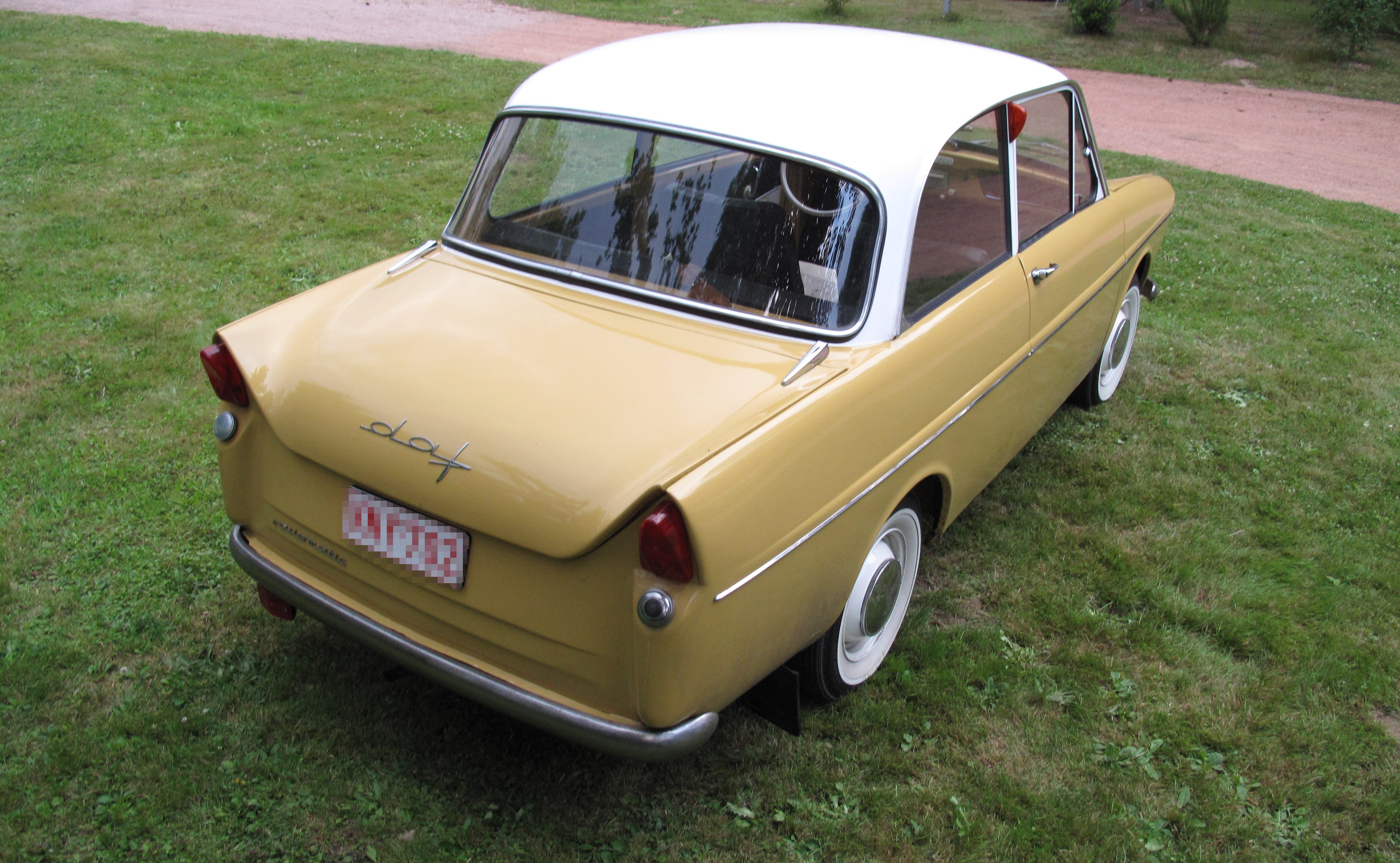

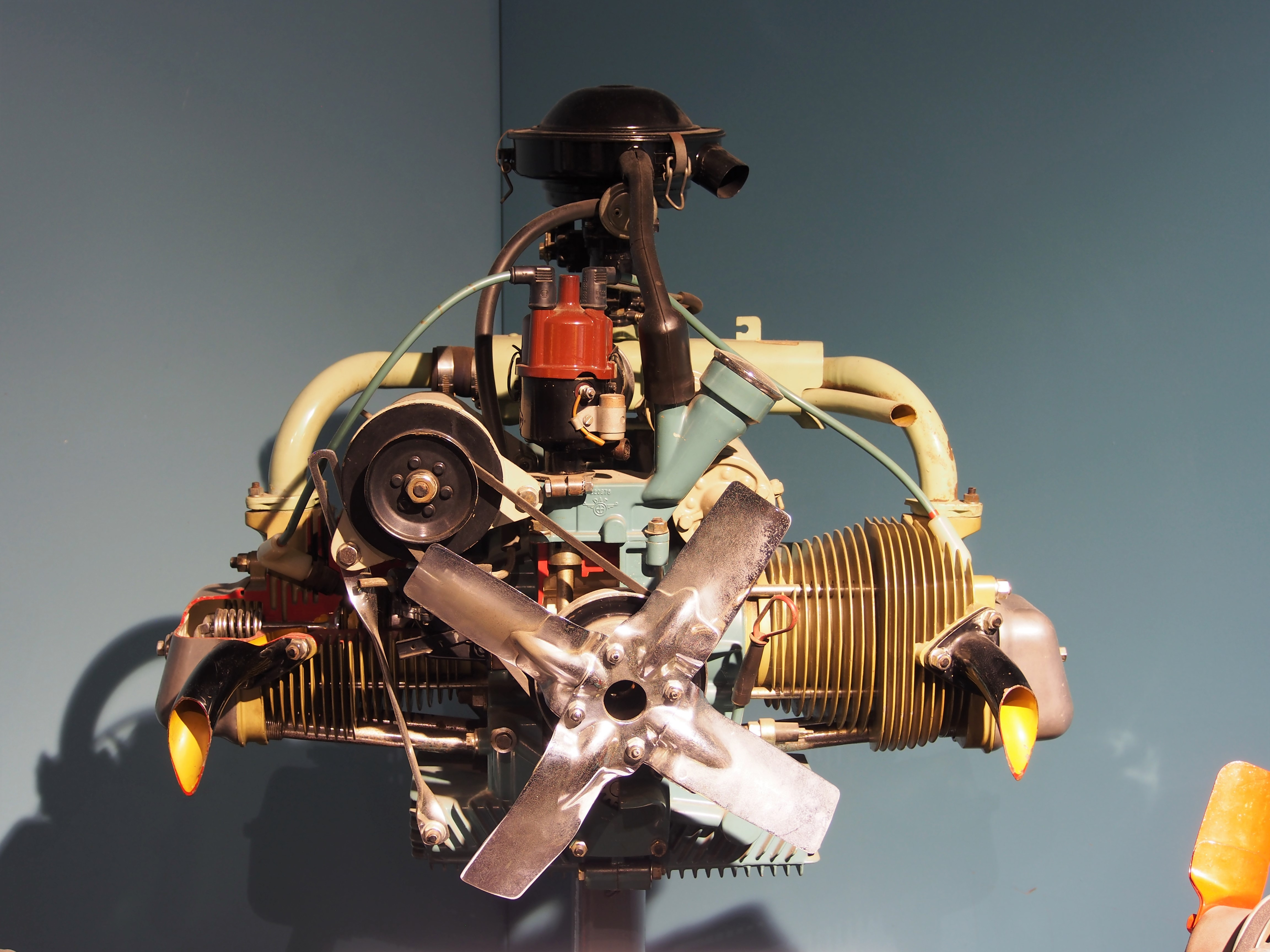
