= DAF 33 =

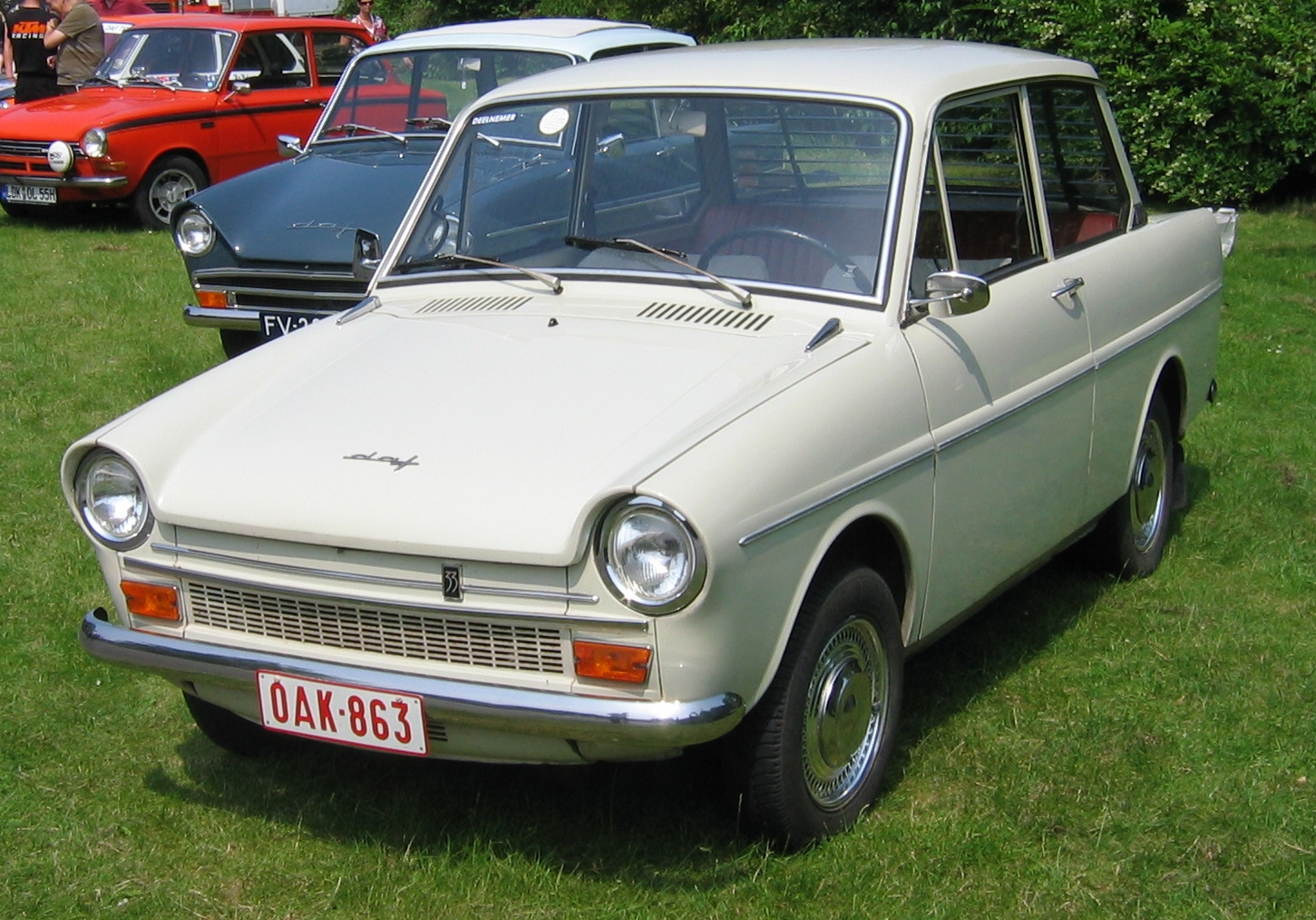

Overview
- Manufacturer: DAF
- Production: 1967–1974; 131,621 produced
- Assembly: Netherlands: Born (DAF Born)
- Designer: Johan van der Brugghen

Body and chassis
- Body style: 2-door sedan 2-door pick-up 2-door van
- Layout: FR layout

Powertrain
- Engine: 746 cc flat twin
- Transmission: Variomatic (continuously variable)

Dimensions
- Wheelbase: 80.7 in (2,050 mm)
- Length: 143 in (3,632 mm)
- Width: 57 in (1,448 mm)
- Height: 54.5 in (1,384 mm)

Chronology
- Predecessor: DAF Daffodil
- Successor: DAF 44

The DAF 33 is a compact saloon car produced by the DAF company, of Eindhoven in the Netherlands, between 1967 and 1974. Outwardly and technically it differed little from its predecessor, the DAF Daffodil.

1966 had seen the introduction of the Michelotti-styled DAF 44 which appeared to compete in virtually the same market segment as the Daffodil-based design; but the 33, its development costs presumably long since amortised, remained in production with its new name. A more luxurious version became available in 1969. Thereafter the car changed very little: however, the 6-volt electrical system was replaced with a 12-volt one in 1972.

The DAF 33, in common with other DAF cars, featured a continuously variable transmission system, the DAF Variomatic, which used a V-shaped drive belt and two pulleys connected to a limited-slip differential, giving a CVT-like operation. Notably, this design meant the 33 had almost the same top speed in reverse gear as it did in forward motion: around 70 mph (110 km/h).
