= DAF Daffodil =

DAF 750 / DAF Daffodil
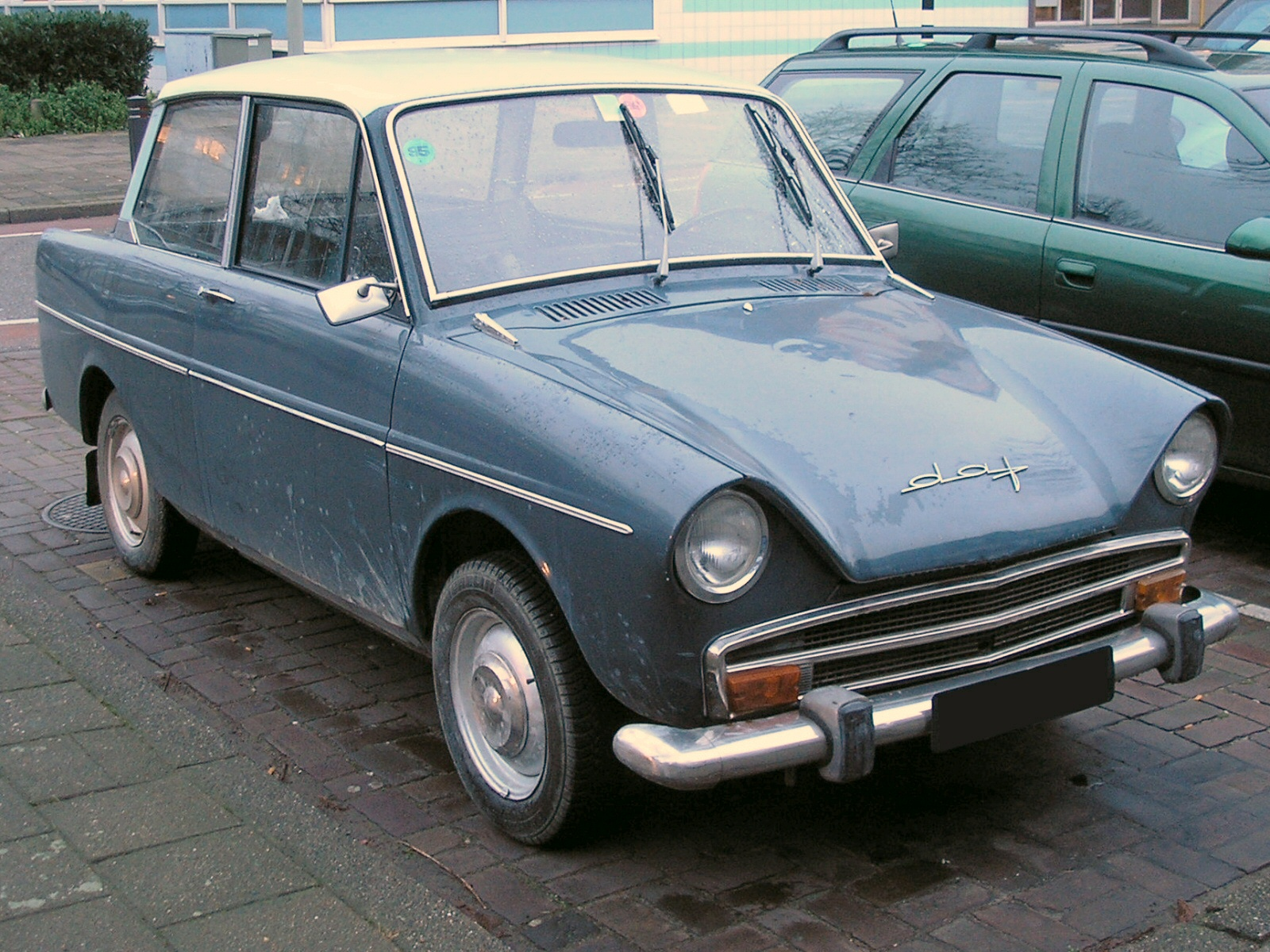

Overview
- Manufacturer: DAF
- Also called: DAF 30 / 31 / 32
- Production: DAF 750: 1961–1963; 16,767 produced DAF Daffodil: 1961–1967; 132,919 produced
- Assembly: Netherlands: Eindhoven
- Designer: Johan van der Brugghen

Body and chassis
- Class: Small family car
- Body style: Saloon; Panel van with or without side windows
- Layout: FR layout

Powertrain
- Engine: 746 cc Flat twin
- Transmission: Variomatic

Dimensions
- Wheelbase: 2,050 mm (80.7 in)
- Length: 3,610 mm (142.1 in)
- Height: 1,440 mm (56.7 in)

Chronology
- Predecessor: DAF 600
- Successor: DAF 33

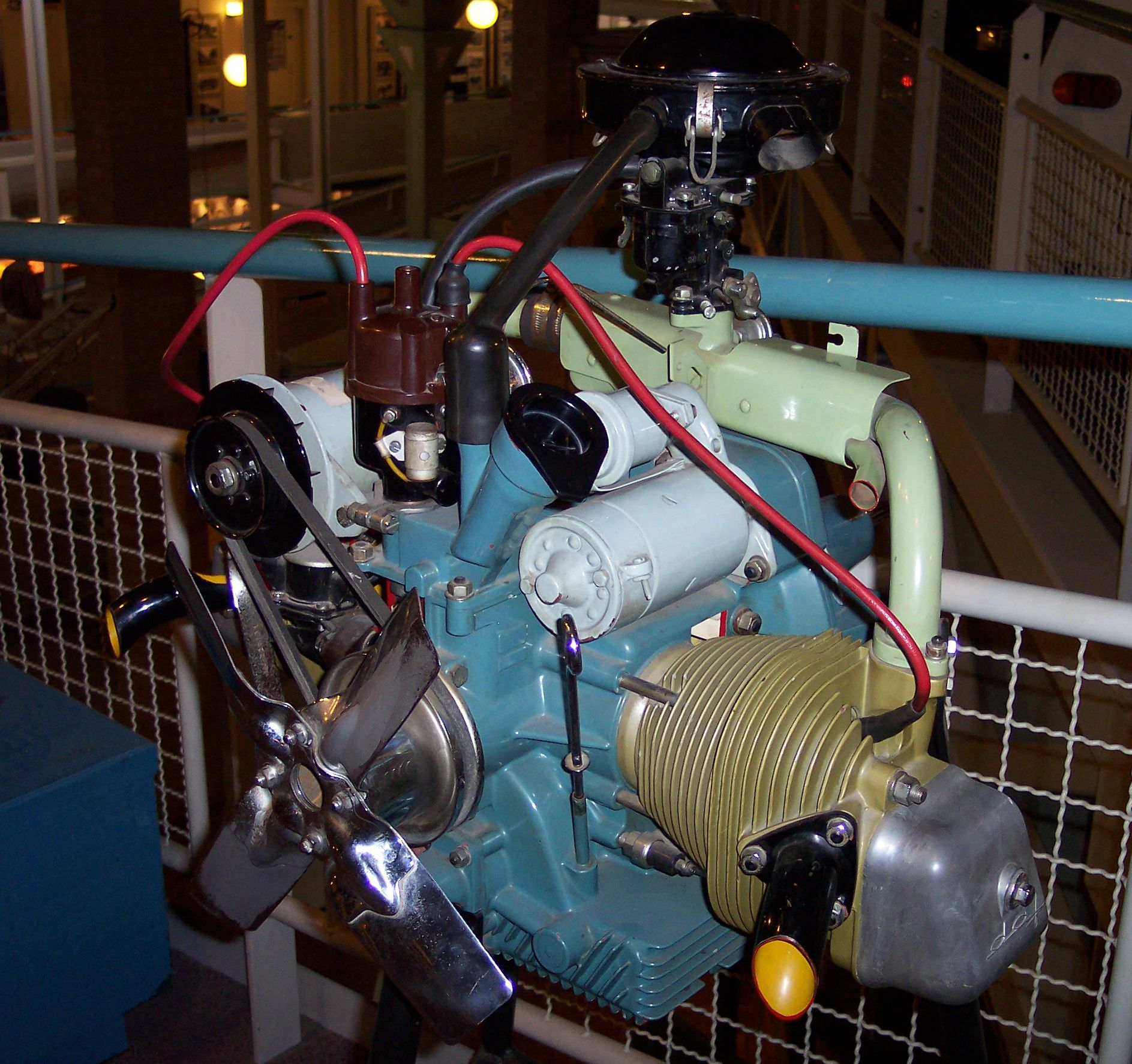
DAF 2 cylinder boxer engine

The DAF Daffodil is an economy small family car that was manufactured by Dutch automaker DAF from 1961 until 1967. Together with the DAF 750, launched at the same time, it replaced the DAF 600. DAFs 750 was essentially the same car but with even fewer luxurious fittings and less chrome trim on the outside. Both the Daffodil and the 750 retained the Variomatic automatic transmission system as standard, which distinguished them from most other small and cheap cars on the market.

The Daffodil was conceived as an export version of the 750; market response dictated that the 750 ceased production in 1963 while the Daffodil, benefitting from a succession of mild face lifts, remained in production until 1967. The Daffodil was replaced by the very similar but slightly more powerful DAF 33.

== The names ==
The Daffodil name worked well in some markets, but in Germany the more luxuriously equipped version of the DAF 750 was known as the DAF 30. Upgrades in 1963 and 1965 were marked by name changes to DAF 31 and DAF 32. In these markets the launch of the DAF 33 in 1967 was a logical continuation of the existing line.

== The engine ==
The 746 cc four stroke air cooled 2 cylinder Boxer engine had the same stroke as in the 600, but the bore was increased from 76 mm to 85.5 mm. Claimed power output was also increased from 22 bhp (16 kW) to 30 bhp (22 kW), with a claimed top speed of 105 km/h (65 mph). The 0-50 mph (80 km/h) time took 29 seconds, as tested by the Consumers Union in the United States.

== Running gear ==
The DAF 600 was the first car mass-produced with a continuously variable transmission (CVT) – the innovative DAF Variomatic system. The same system was carried over to the 750, the Daffodil, and its variants. No conventional gearboxes were offered on the cars – all these economy cars came with this automatic transmission system as standard.

=== Variomatic working principles ===
The Variomatic employs centrifugal weights to control the drive ratio of the transmission and is enhanced by the engine manifold vacuum. The action of the bob weights and inlet vacuum combined to pull together the cheeks of two variable-diameter driving pulleys, driven directly from the engine. These were connected, by rubber 'V' belts, to two similar driven pulleys, connected to the drive wheels. The cheeks of the driven pulleys were held together by spring tension, which was progressively overcome as the drive pulleys expanded and the tension of the belts increased.

The DAF Variomatics were thereby the only cars ever produced which went faster by the simple expedient of gently and gradually releasing the accelerator once top engine speed had been reached, because the increased vacuum took over from the reducing bob weight speed. The Variomatic also permitted increased engine braking by operating a switch on the dashboard to reverse the action of the vacuum on the pulley's diaphragm, seeking a lower ratio with increased manifold vacuum.

Two separate transmissions underneath the rear seat ran the two driving wheels – one on each wheel, eliminating the need for a differential, since belt slippage allowed for differing speeds of the inner and outer wheels in corners. Strictly speaking, this system worked like a rear transaxle, yielding a favorable weight distribution. The duplication also provided redundancy – if one belt broke, the vehicle would still be driven by one wheel.

An incidental feature was that in reverse (at least for earlier examples) the system allowed the same top speed to be driven as going forwards. Later cars locked the transmission in the lowest ratio when reverse was selected.

== Chronology ==
Between 1961 and 1967 the mechanical aspects of the car were not significantly changed.

1963 marked the withdrawal of the 750 and 30 badges, and the DAF 30 was replaced by the DAF 31. The exterior of the car was modestly reworked with input from Giovanni Michelotti which involved sharpened angles and more prominent fins: the interior was also significantly upgraded.

In 1965 the DAF 32 replaced the DAF 31. This upgrade was marked by further limited changes to the body panels, again involving Michelotti whose influence would continue to be seen on DAF passenger cars until the Limburg car assembly business was acquired by Volvo.

== Popular references ==
The DAF Daffodil appeared in the 1960s spy drama series The Baron, driven by Cordelia (Sue Lloyd). It also gave its name to the late 1980s/early 1990s Manchester Indie band The New Fast Automatic Daffodils, after an advert for the car, which stated "The New, Fast Daffodil - fully Automatic".
