= DAF Trucks =

Dutch truck manufacturing company

DAF Trucks NV

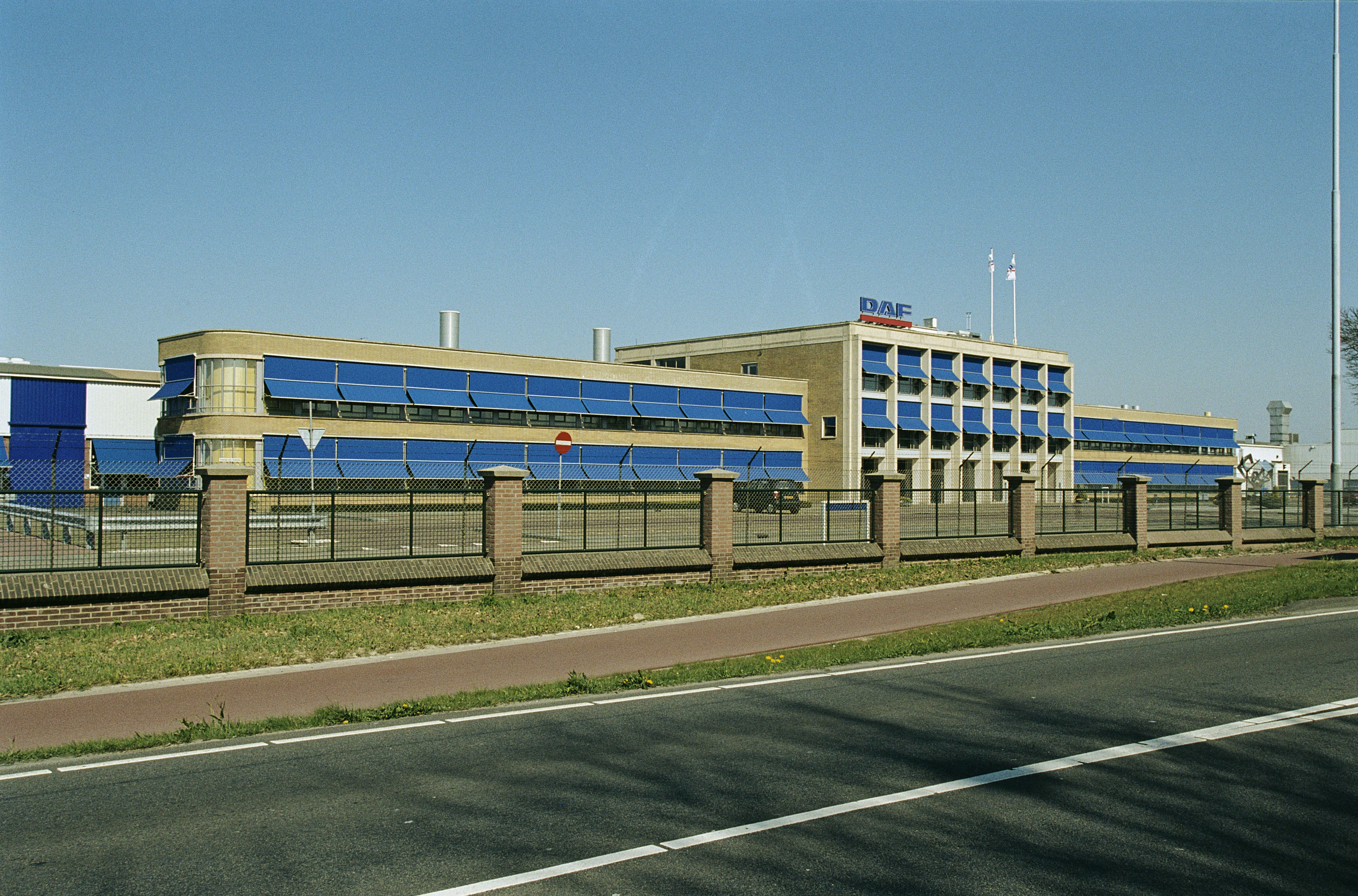
- Type: Subsidiary PLC (Naamloze vennootschap)
- Industry: Manufacturing
- Founded: 1928; 98 years ago
- Founder: Van Doorne brothers (Hub and Wim)
- Headquarters: Eindhoven, Netherlands
- Key people: Harald Seidel (President); Ron Borsboom (Executive Director Product Development); Richard Zink (Director Marketing & Sales); Frans Nagtegaal (CEO)
- Products: Trucks
- Total equity: $ 1.7 billion
- Parent: Paccar
- Subsidiaries: Tatra Trucks (19%); DAF Trucks Australia
- Website: www.daf.com

DAF Trucks is a Dutch truck manufacturing company and a division of Paccar. DAF originally stood for van Doorne's Aanhangwagen Fabriek. Its headquarters and main plant are in Eindhoven. Cabs and axle assemblies are produced at its Westerlo plant in Belgium. Some of the truck models sold with the DAF brand are designed and built by Leyland Trucks at its Leyland plant in the United Kingdom.

== History ==
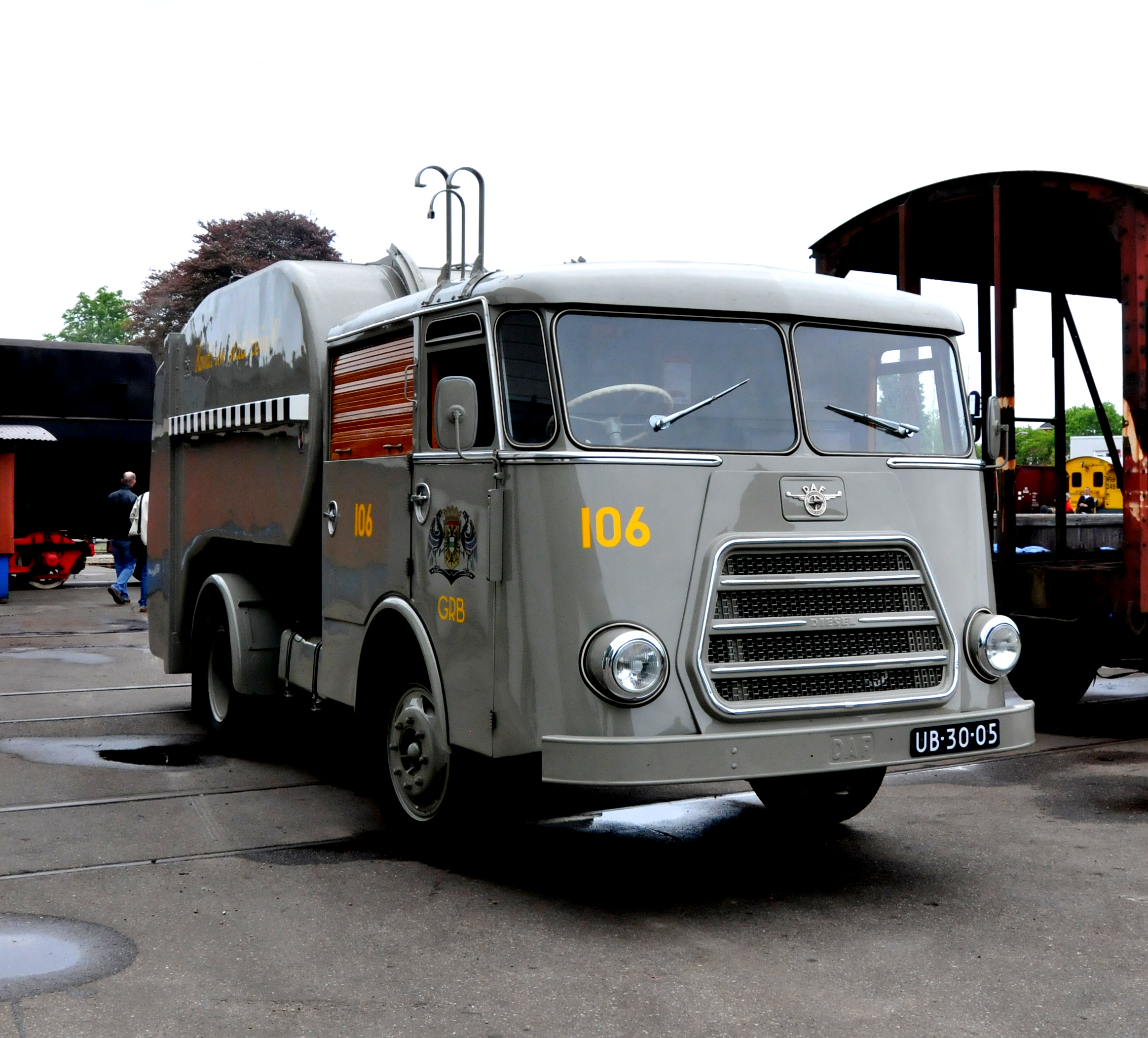
DAF Truck type G1300DA325

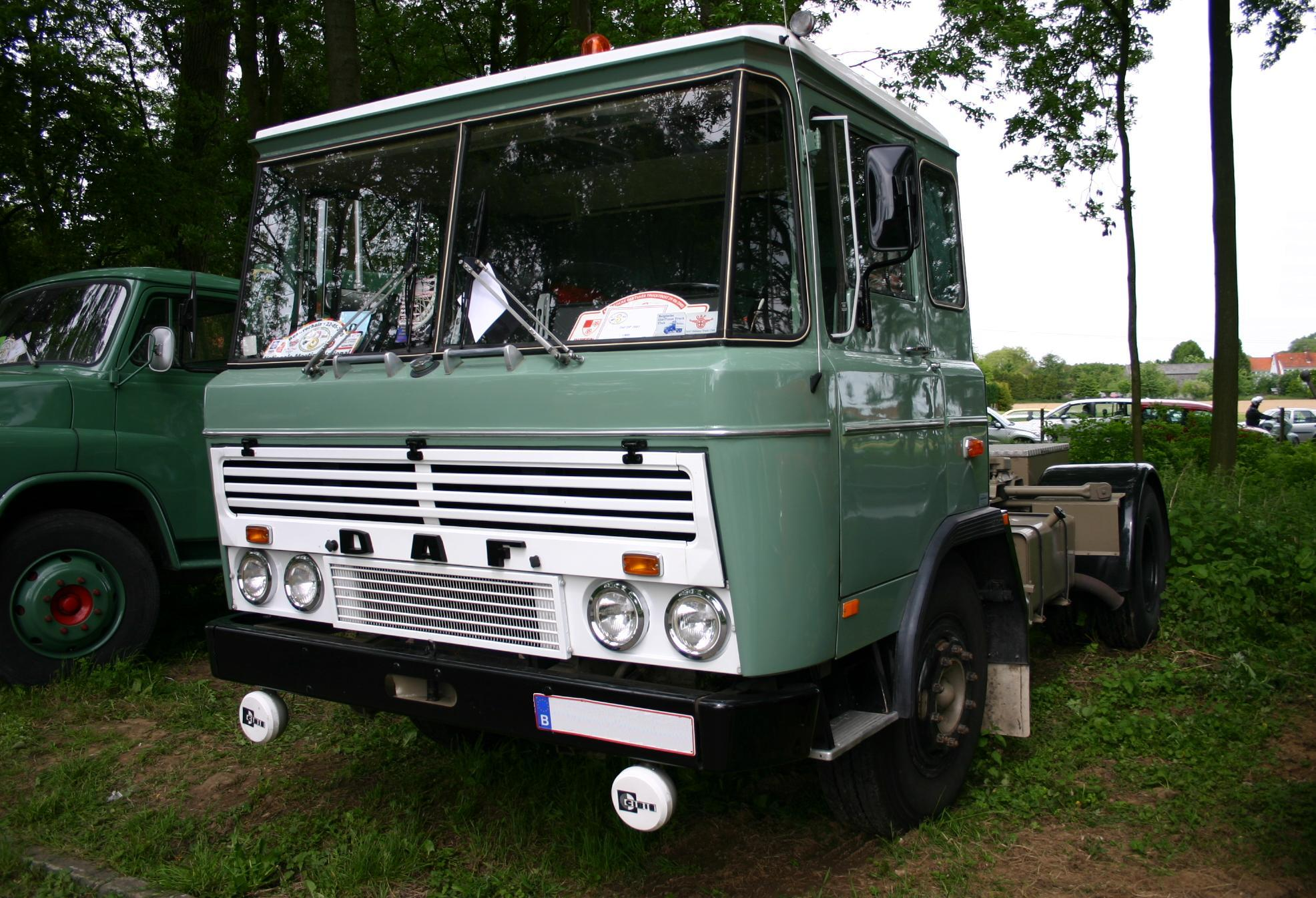
Classic DAF 2600 cab over truck

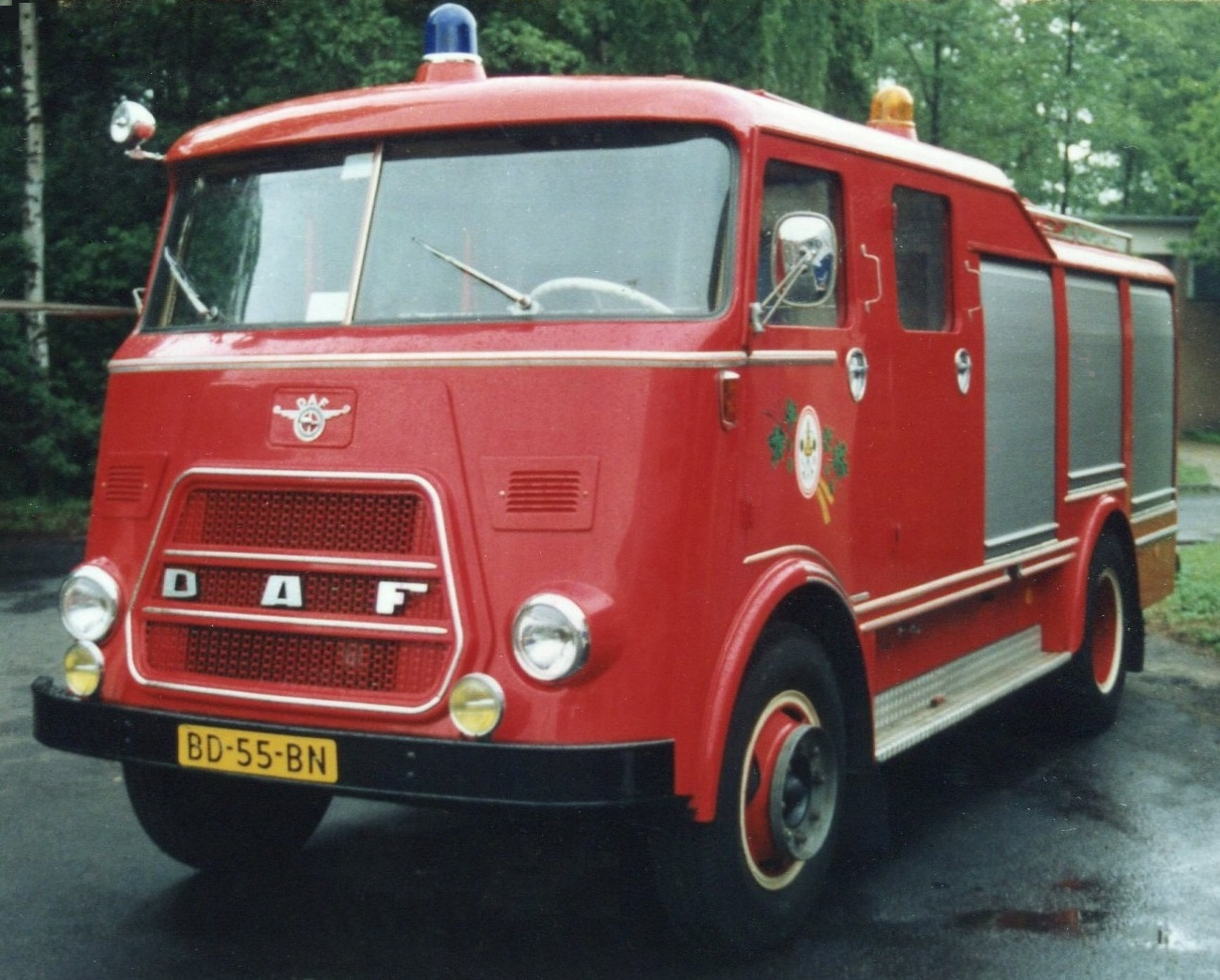
DAF fire truck

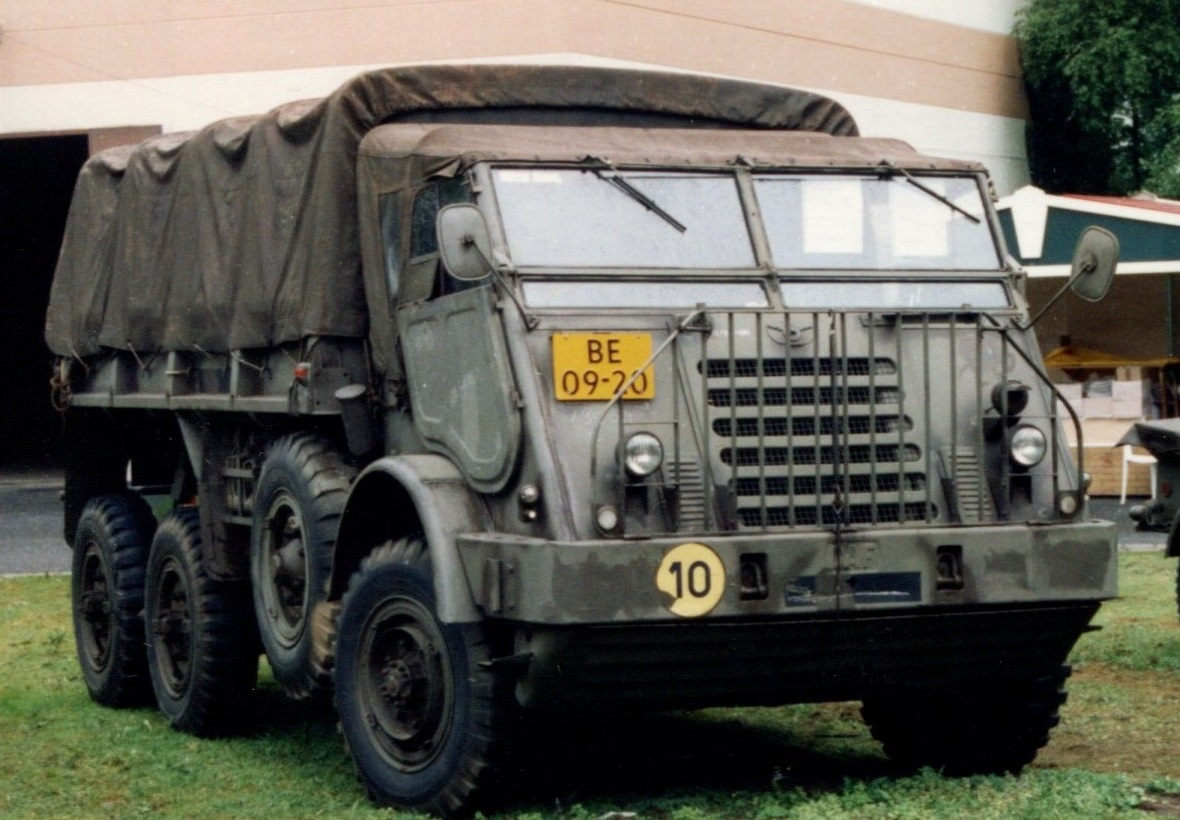
A DAF YA-328 military truck

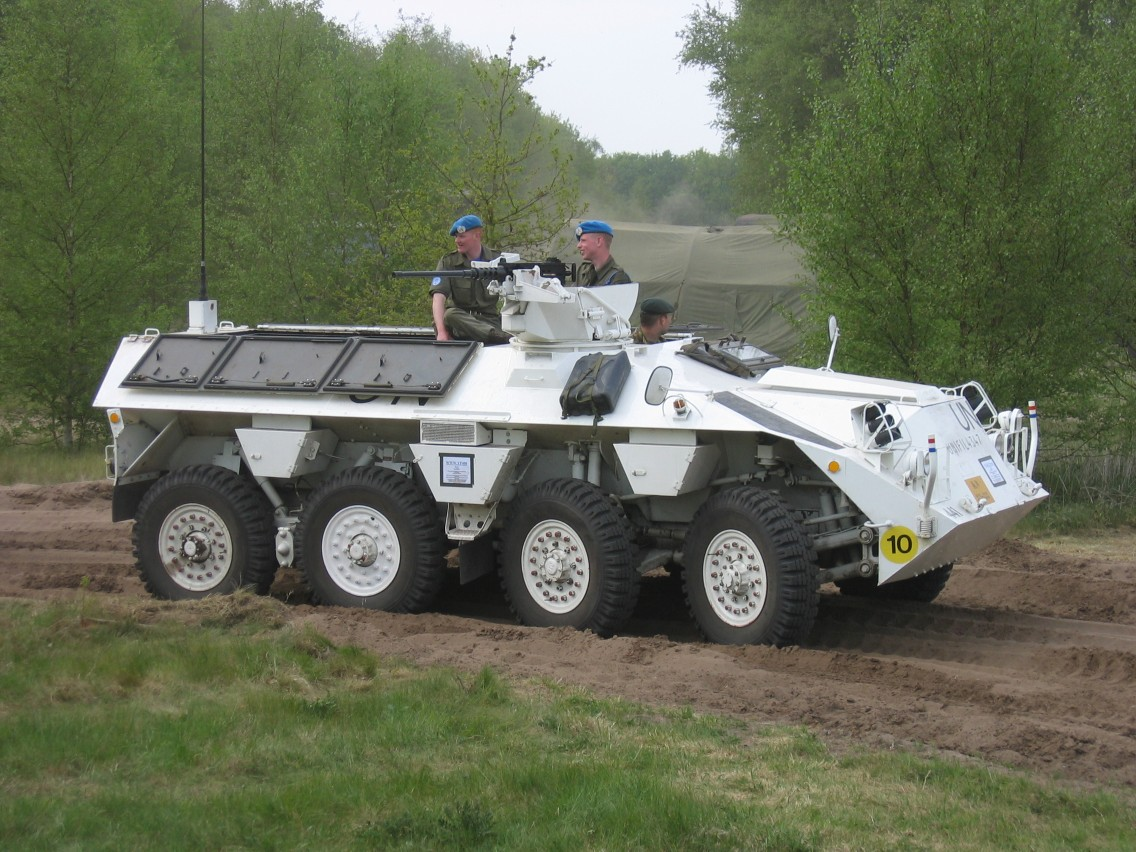
DAF YP-408 used by UNIFIL

In 1928, Hubert "Hub" van Doorne founded the company Commanditaire Vennootschap Hub van Doorne's Machinefabriek. His co-founder and investor was A. H. Huenges, managing director of a brewery. Van Doorne had repaired Huenges' car several times, and Huenges, pleased with his work, offered to finance him in business. Hub started to work in a small workshop on the grounds of the brewery.

In 1932, the company, by then run by Hub and his brother, Wim van Doorne, changed its name to Van Doorne's Aanhangwagen Fabriek (Van Doorne's Trailer Factory), abbreviated to DAF. Huenges left the company in 1936 and the DAF company was then completely in the hands of the van Doorne brothers.

DAF developed the Trado conversions to convert 4×2 Ford trucks to an off-road 6×4 drive. One of DAF's few armoured vehicles, the M39 Pantserwagen, used developments of this Trado drivetrain. M39 production came too late for World War II – in the invasion of the Netherlands (1940) only three saw combat.

After World War II, luxury cars and trucks were very scarce. This meant a big opportunity for DAF. In 1949, the company started making trucks, trailers and buses, changing its name to Van Doorne's Automobiel Fabriek (Van Doorne's Automobile Factory). The first lorry model was the DAF A30.

Through the 1950s, DAF was a major supplier to the re-equipping of the Dutch Army's softskin vehicles, with models such as the DAF YA-126 and DAF YA-328 Dikke Daf. These used the all-wheel drive H-drive developed from the Trado conversions.

In late 1954, Hub van Doorne had the idea to use belt driven continuously variable transmissions (CVT), like so many belt-driven machines in factories, to drive road vehicles. In 1955, DAF produced its first draft of a car belt drive system. Over the next few years, the design was developed and refined. In February 1958, DAF demonstrated a small belt-driven four-seater car at the Dutch car show (the AutoRAI).

The public reaction was very positive and 4,000 cars were ordered. In 1959, DAF started selling the world's first car with a CVT, the small four seater DAF 600. This was the first of a series of models to be released in subsequent years, including the DAF 33, DAF 44, DAF 55 and DAF 66, all using the innovative Variomatic transmission system.

In 1967, DAF opened a new plant in Born for car production. The 44 was the first model to be produced there.

In 1972, International Harvester of Chicago bought a 33% stake in DAF (with the Dutch government holding 25% and the Van Doorne family holding the remaining 42%), forming a joint venture. This agreement lasted until 1981. DAF sold its passenger car division, along with what is now the Nedcar factory in Born, in 1975 to the Swedish company Volvo Cars, leaving DAF to concentrate on its successful line of trucks.

In 1987, DAF merged with the Leyland Trucks division of Rover Group (which included Freight Rover), and in June 1989 was floated on the Dutch and London Stock Exchanges as DAF NV. The new company traded as Leyland DAF in the United Kingdom, and as DAF elsewhere.

DAF Bus was split off in 1990 to become a part of United Bus. Following difficulties in the British market, DAF NV was placed under administration in February 1993. The Dutch operations were sold in a management buyout, with the business branded DAF Trucks.

In October 1996 Paccar acquired DAF Trucks. DAF Trucks and Leyland Trucks were rejoined in June 1998, when Paccar also acquired Leyland Trucks. On 9 January 2012, Paccar installed the cornerstone of the new plant in the city of Ponta Grossa, in the state of Paraná, Brazil.

DAF now has a net worth of 1.7 billion dollars.

=== Car business ===
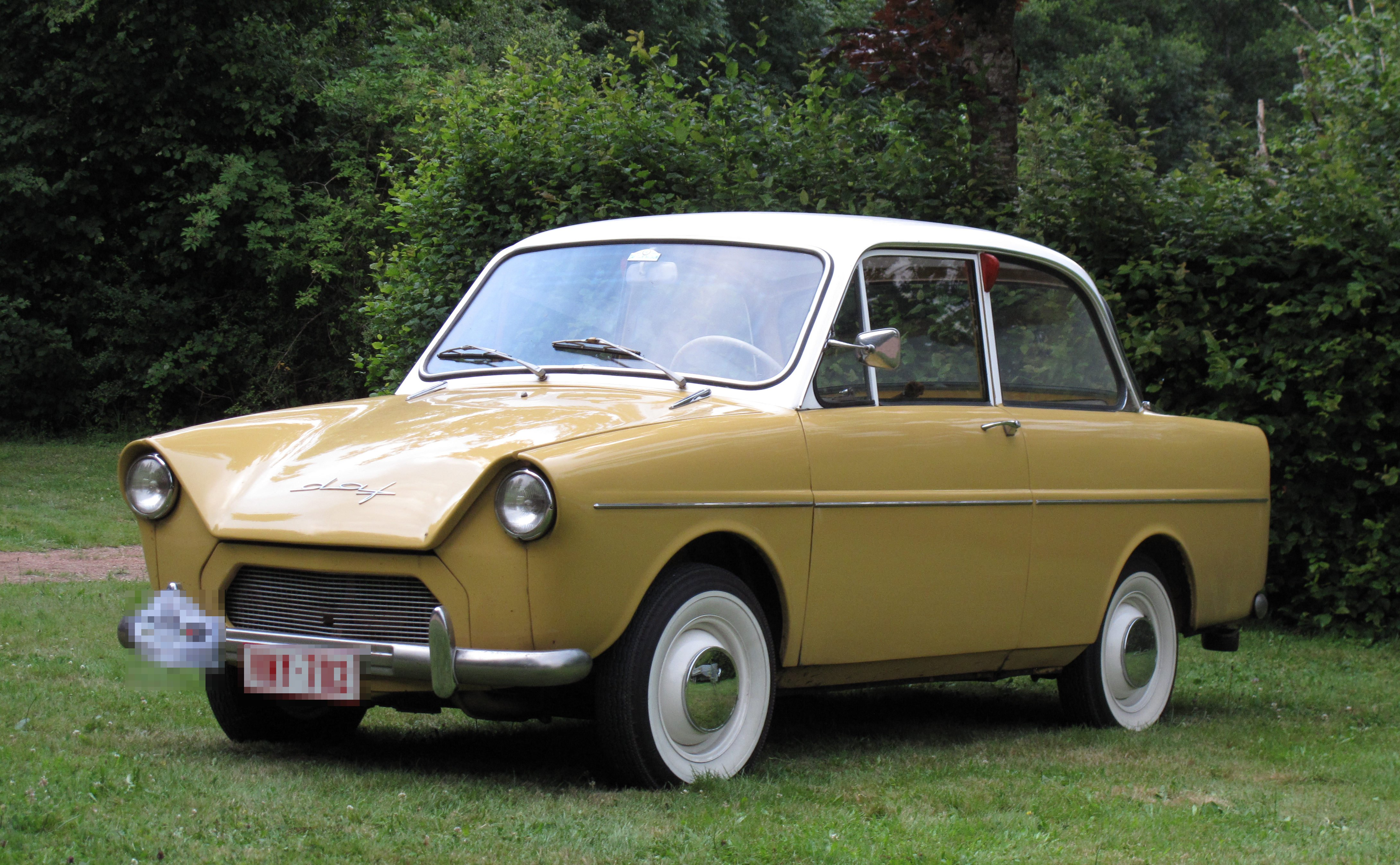
DAF 600

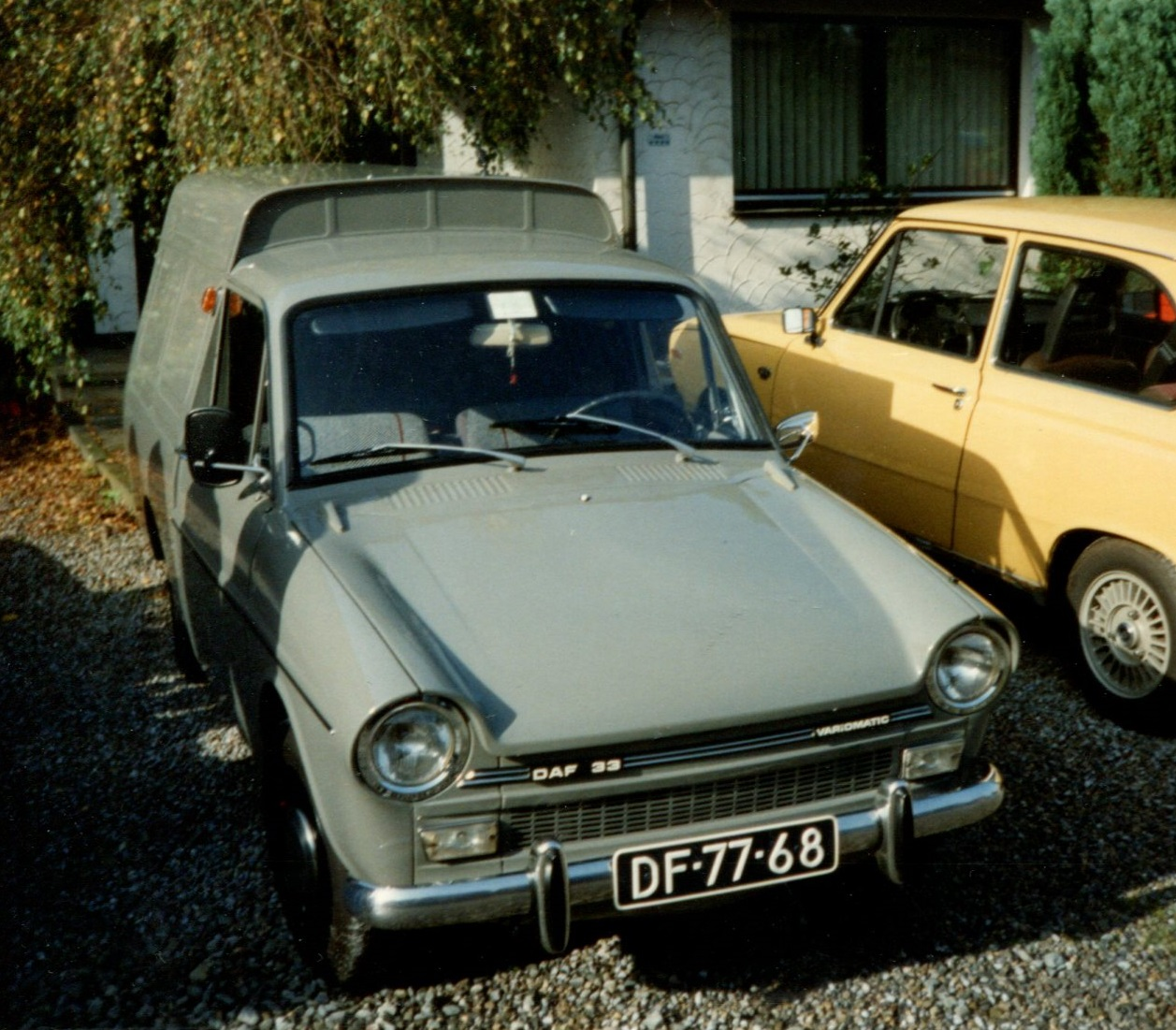
DAF 33 Break

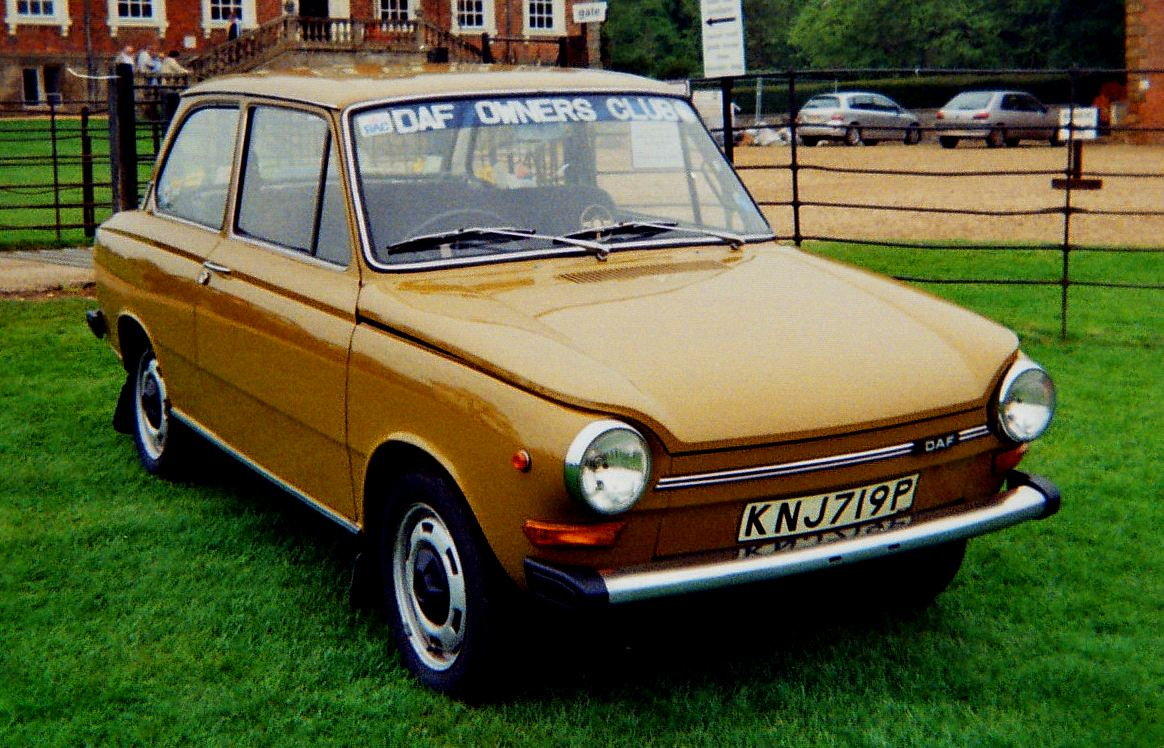
1975 DAF 44

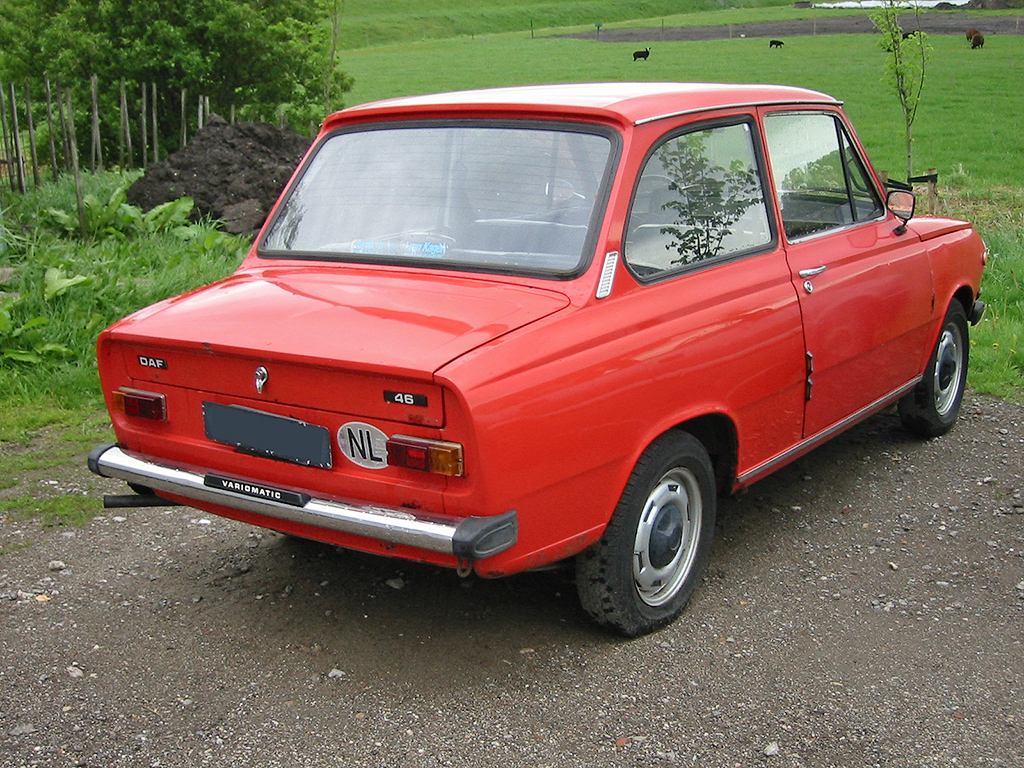
DAF 46

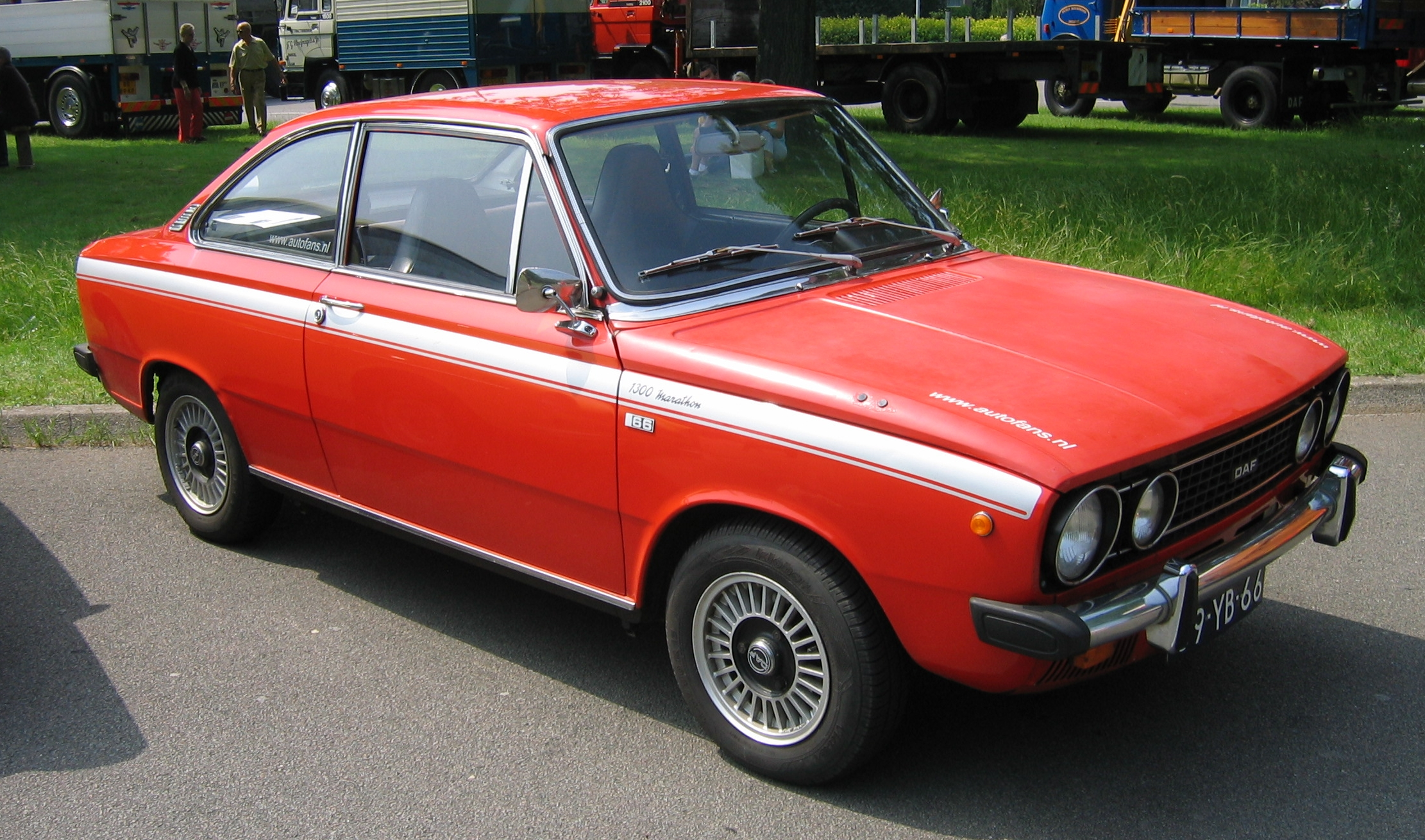
DAF 66 Marathon Coupe

The first passenger car, the DAF 600, was presented to the public in February 1958. It featured unitary steel construction, with a front mounted, air cooled two cylinder boxer engine driving the rear wheels through a centrifugal clutch and the Variomatic CVT transmission. The way this was constructed eliminated the need for a differential, with the drivebelts taking up the difference of speed in turns.

This acted as a limited-slip differential. The car had independent suspension all around, with MacPherson struts and a transverse leaf spring at the front, and a coil sprung semi trailing arm design at the rear. The first 600s rolled off the production line in the following year. The next model was the 750, featuring a larger 749 cc (45.7 cu in) twin.

Later, DAF produced a more luxurious type called the Daffodil, divided into three models assigned the numbers DAF 30, DAF 31 and DAF 32. The designation 32 was changed to 33 upon the 1966 release of the 44, a larger middle class vehicle designed by Giovanni Michelotti.

The 44 featured a completely new design aesthetically as well as mechanically, but was of the same layout as the "A types" (the 600, 750, 30, 31, 32 and 33), with the main difference being its 850 cc (52 cu in) two cylinder engine, and its full swing axle rear axle design as opposed to the A type semi trailing arms.

The 1968 DAF 55 carried a bigger water cooled 1,108 cc (67.6 cu in) OHV four cylinder engine derived from the Renault 8 Cleon engine. Its body design was altered from the 44 by a new front which accommodated the longer engine and radiator, bigger taillights, and a more plush interior. The front suspension was changed from a transverse leaf spring to MacPherson struts with torsion springs and an antiroll bar.

The DAF 66 was introduced as a successor to the 55. It featured new, boxy styling of the front, and a new rear axle design. The two drive belts now powered a differential, and the axle was changed from a swing axle design to a leaf sprung de Dion axle. It was a major improvement over the (tricky) handling of the swing axles of the earlier 33, 44 and 55 models.

Volvo purchased a 33 percent stake in DAF in December 1972, with the intent of taking a larger interest. They increased their holdings to 75% on 1 January 1975, taking over the company and the Nedcar plant. Volvo dropped the 33 and 44 models, and later rebadged the DAF 66 as the Volvo 66, with bigger bumpers and a safety steering wheel.

The DAF 46 was developed with Volvo's assistance, and was basically a 44 with the rear axle of a 66 and a single belt Variomatic (half the 66's transmission). A big weakness of this system is that a failed drive belt would cripple the car. The last DAF design, codenamed P900, initially intended to be the DAF 77, was developed during the transition to Volvo ownership and was ultimately launched as the Volvo 300 series in 1976, firstly as the Volvo 343 three door hatchback with the Variomatic transmission.

After initial slow sales, the range was expanded into the 340/360, with a five-door variant and the availability of manual transmission, and the 340/360 range became a sales success, eventually surpassing 1.3 million units by the time production ceased in 1991. The subsequent Volvo 440/460/480 and the first generation S40/V40 models were also made at the Nedcar plant, until Volvo sold its interest to Mitsubishi Motors in 2001, marking the end of Volvo's involvement with the former DAF plant after almost thirty years. The plant was last owned by VDL Nedcar, who contract manufactured certain Mini models for BMW. Car manufacturing at the Nedcar plant ended in 2024 with the end of the BMW contract.

==== Prototypes and special cars ====
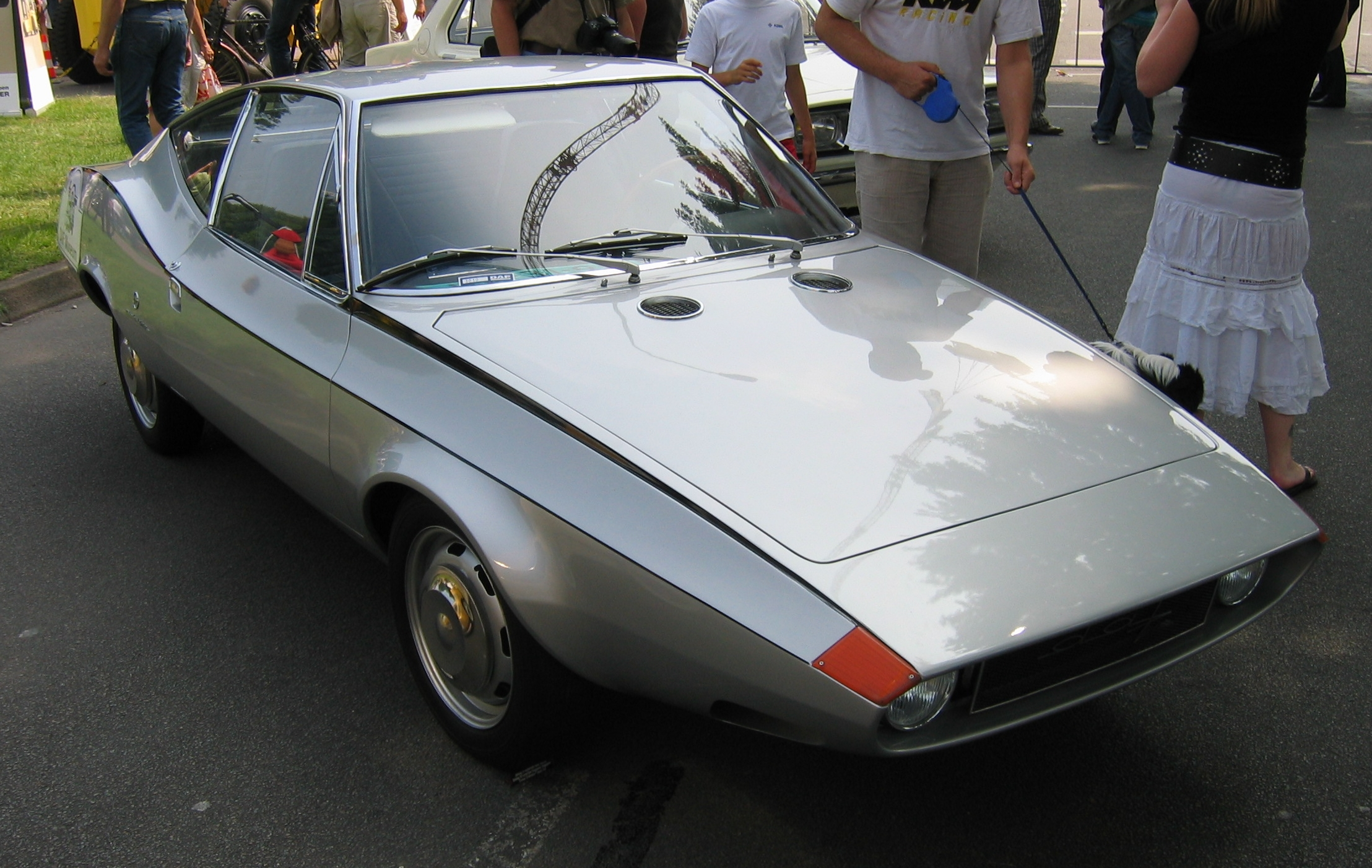
DAF Siluro

For a small company, DAF made a huge number of prototypes. Also, famous coachbuilders like Giovanni Michelotti and OSI made cars based on DAF mechanicals. For instance, the OSI City Car, which turned into a miniature. There was also Michelotti's "Shellette" beach car, which was later modified to use Fiat 850 underpinnings. The Dutch Royal Family used one of these at their Porto Ercole summer residence.

== Truck business ==
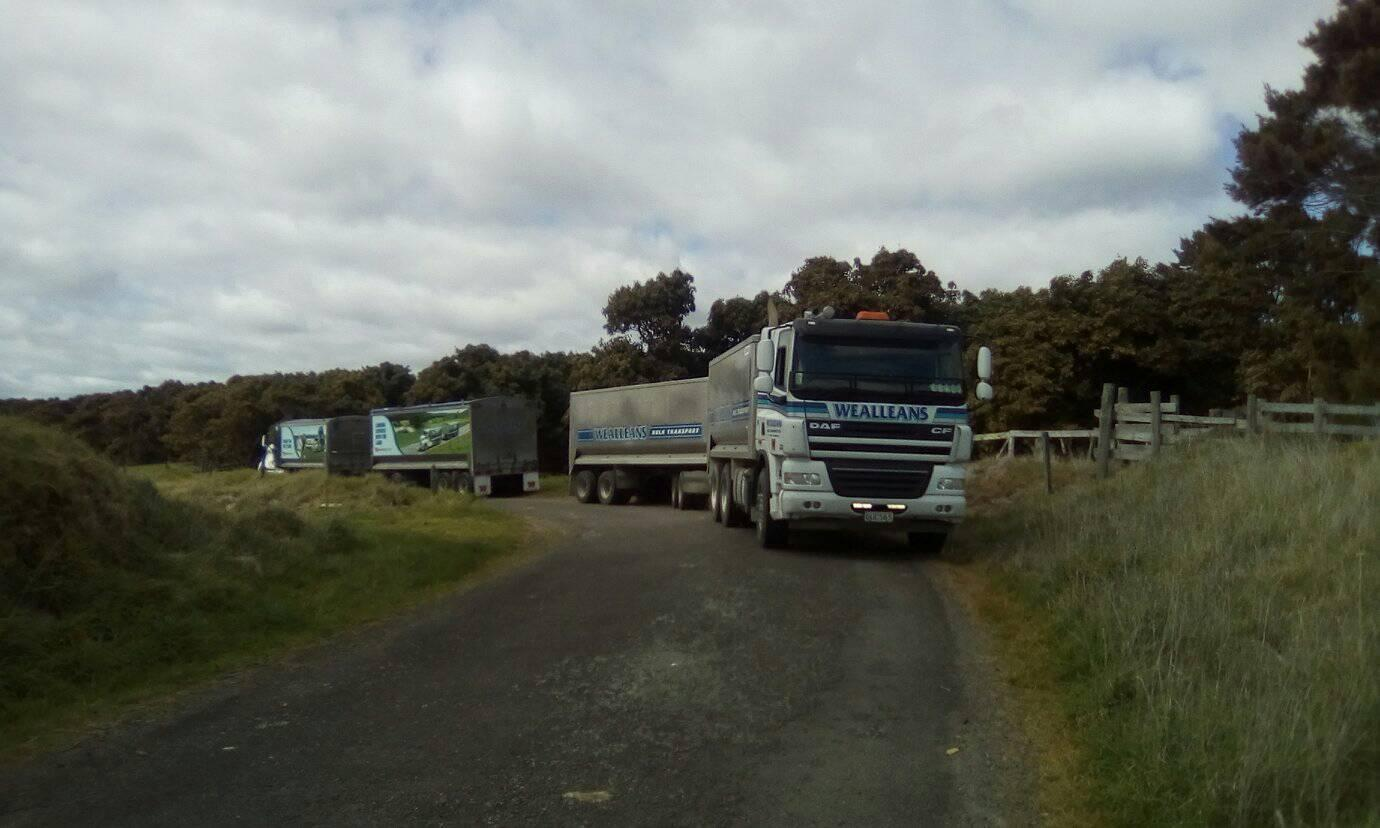
DAF CF 85.510

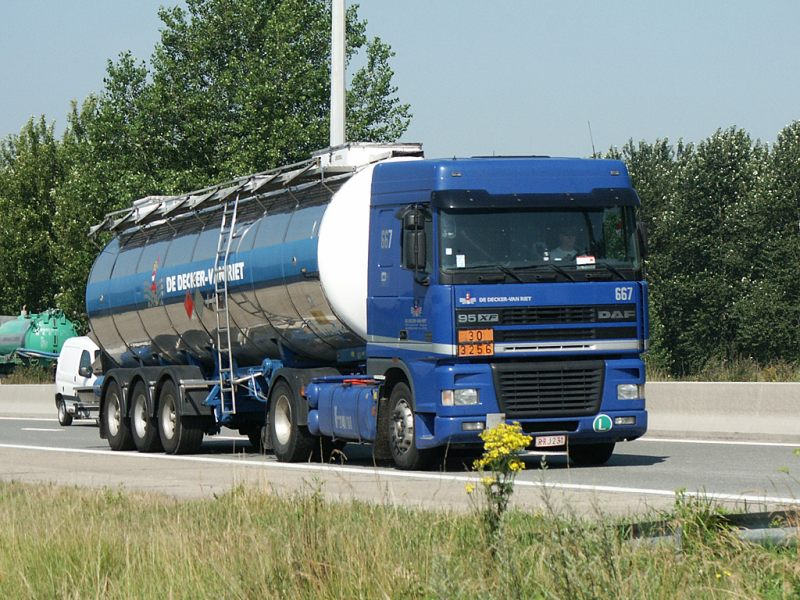
DAF 95 XF

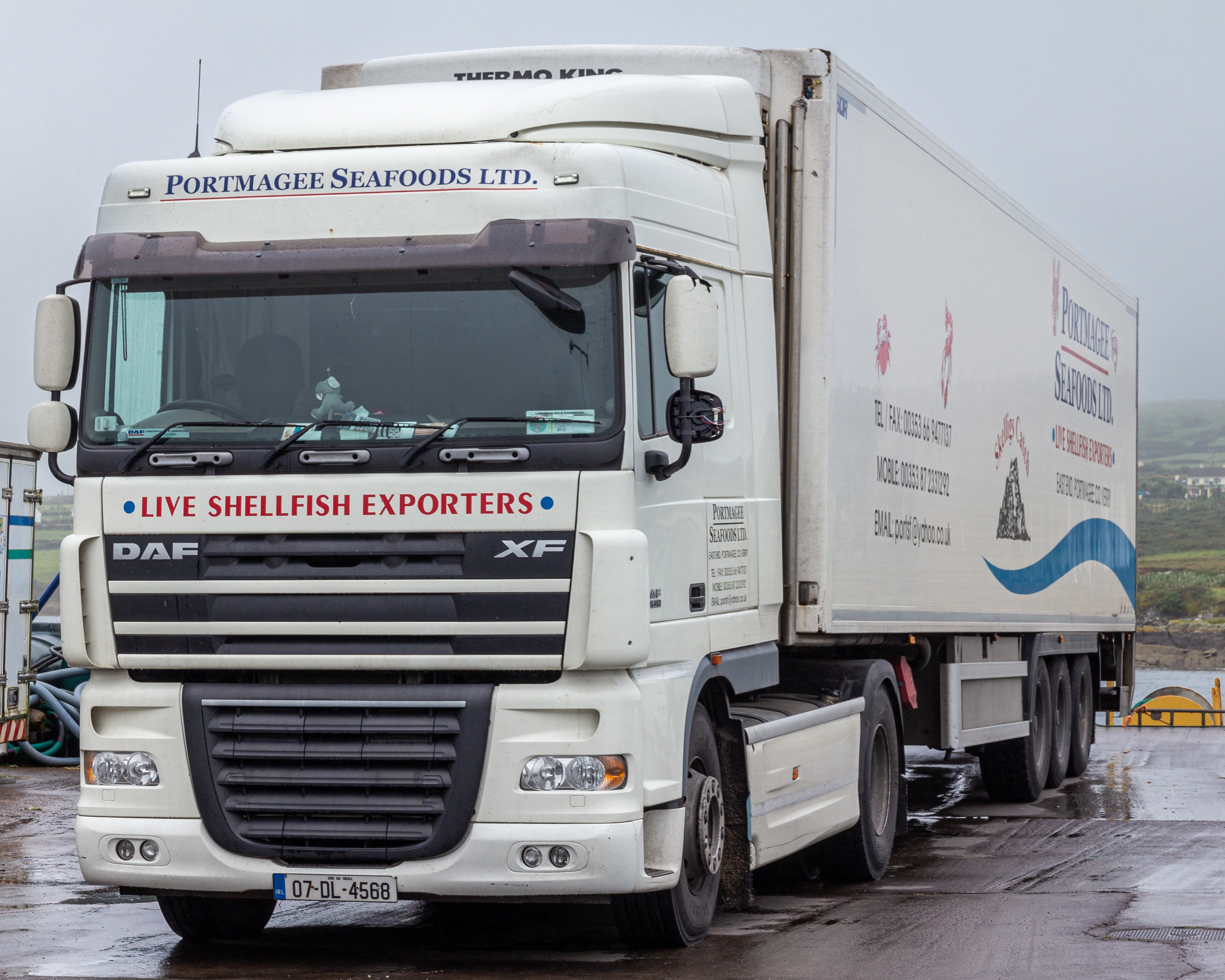
DAF XF 105

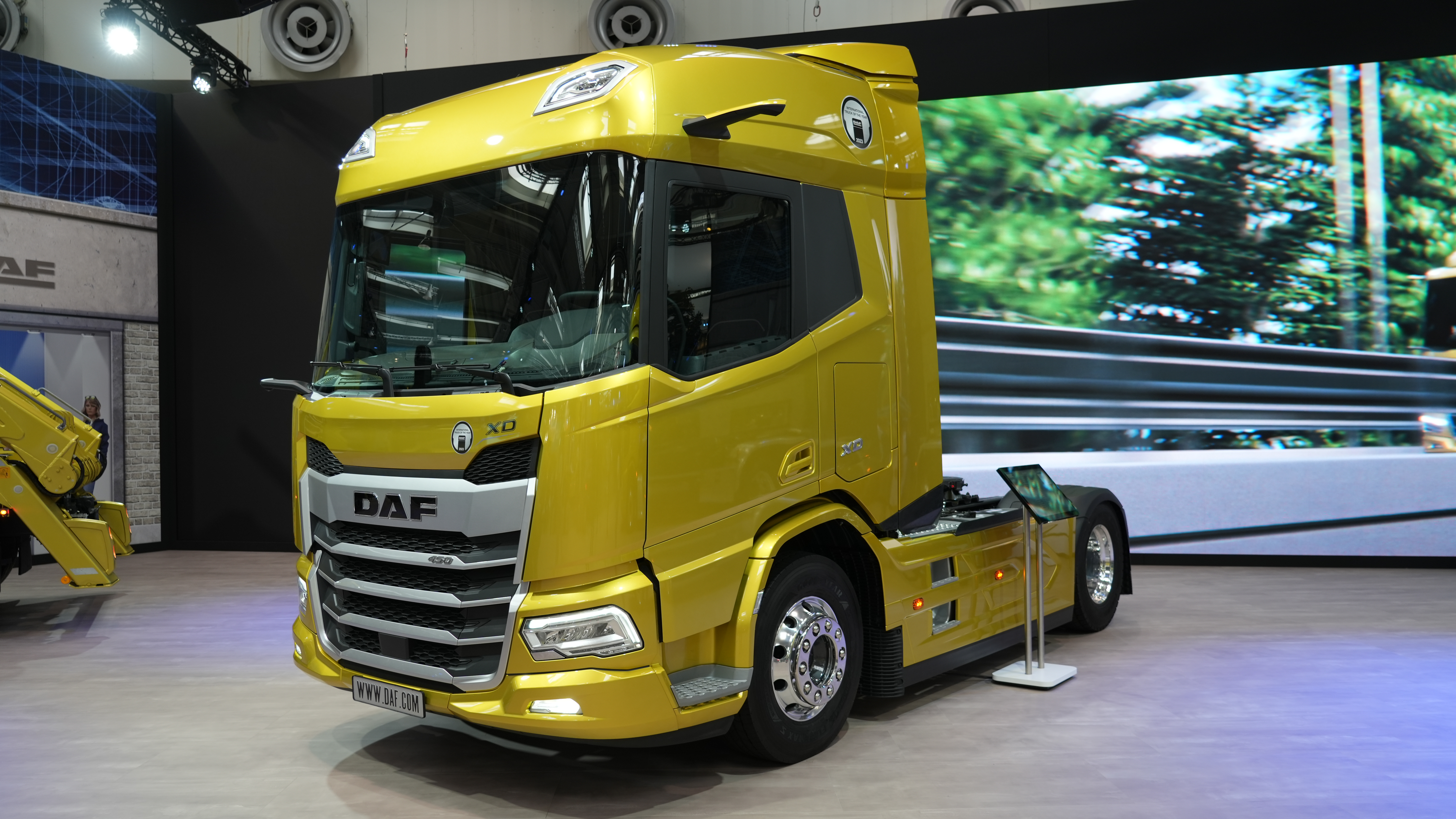
DAF XD 450

DAF produced its first truck, the A30, in 1949. This truck was upgraded in the following years. Their first attempt into the international market was a failure, the 2000DO. Their next truck was the 1964 2600, which became a big seller with its well equipped but practical cabin. They also produced a so-called torpedo front tractor.

In the 1970s, a new modular tilting cab called the F218 was introduced on the F1600/F2000 range of vehicles. Three years later, the wider F241, which featured DAF's characteristic three wiper windscreen, was introduced as the DAF 2800. This design lasted until the introduction of the 95 style cab in 1987. There was also a lighter, narrower version called the 'F198 which was introduced in 1972 on the F1200 and F1400, but this short lived model was replaced after only three years. In 1984, DAF truck production was 13,645; this increased to 14,382 in calendar year 1985.

DAF was also one of the first to introduce an intercooled turbocharged diesel engine into their trucks, which in these years became very evident with their 3600. Their largest 11.6-litre (710 cu in) six cylinder turbodiesel was based on the old Leyland O.680 motor. It was to be DAF's standard large engine long into the nineties.

DAF's 95 series was launched in 1987, and quickly gained the coveted 'Truck of The Year' award. The 95 featured an all new cab developed jointly with ENASA of Spain called Cabtec, a revised version of the 11.6-litre ATI engine, rated at 310, 350, or 380 hp (metric), and 16-speed ZF Friedrichshafen gearbox. On the Continent, Eaton's Twinsplitter gearbox was an option. A full range of axle configurations were offered, to suit every operating requirement.

Much attention was paid to soundproofing; the gear linkage for example was telescopic, whilst in-cab noise levels on the 95 put many luxury saloons to shame. An update in 1991 saw new power ratings of 329, 364, and 401 hp; – a 430 hp variant, along with low deck tractor unit models and revised interior trim, were introduced in the spring of 1992.

Two years later, after an intensive study of the ultra long haul market sector, DAF unveiled the 95.500 Super Spacecab at the 1994 RAI show. The 95 series cabin had gained height and length, and sat atop Cummins' 14-litre N14, rated at 507 bhp. ZF's new Aluminium cased 16S221 gearbox was fitted, with optional Intarder. An innovation was the hydraulic gearshift developed with Konsberg of Norway.

Within an overall height of 3.85m, the Super featured an interior height of 2.25m, a luxury bunk with stowage space underneath, and a full range of options including microwave, fridge, and a television/video system. The 95.500 was available as a 4x2 tractor or drawbar rigid, with LHD only, though the Super Spacecab was available on 11.6-litre engined models.

The basic cab design remains in production to this day, latterly as the 95XF and now the XF105, although both these developments of the original 95 are totally different machines under the skin. Other vehicles in the DAF range have included the inherited from Leyland Trucks Roadrunner (Badged DAF 600, 800, 1000 on the Continent) which evolved into the 45 Series, the cab of which was used on the 18 ton gross 55, also as a military spec 4×4.

An all new medium to heavyweight line up debuted in the end of 1992, the 65, 75 and 85 utilising the same wedge shaped cab. Powered by DAF's 6.24-litre (381 cu in), 8.65-litre (528 cu in) and 11.6-litre (710 cu in) engines, some novel styling details featured, while the 85 Series' cab sat 10 cm (3.94 in) higher on the chassis to clear the WS engine.

A short lived model was the 1990 to 1993 80 Series, using the T45 Roadtrain cab acquired from the Leyland Trucks takeover, fitted with the ATI driveline. Also offered for a short period was the 3200, basically a remodelled 2800 with the corporate style, three bar grille.

There is a DAF LF45 hybrid version, which was presented by DAF at the IAA 2010 in Hannover.

=== Tatra ===
In August 2011, DAF announced it had built up a 19% stake in Tatra, which will use DAF cabs and Paccar engines. DAF dealers will sell Tatra off-road trucks.

== Motorsport ==
=== Cars ===
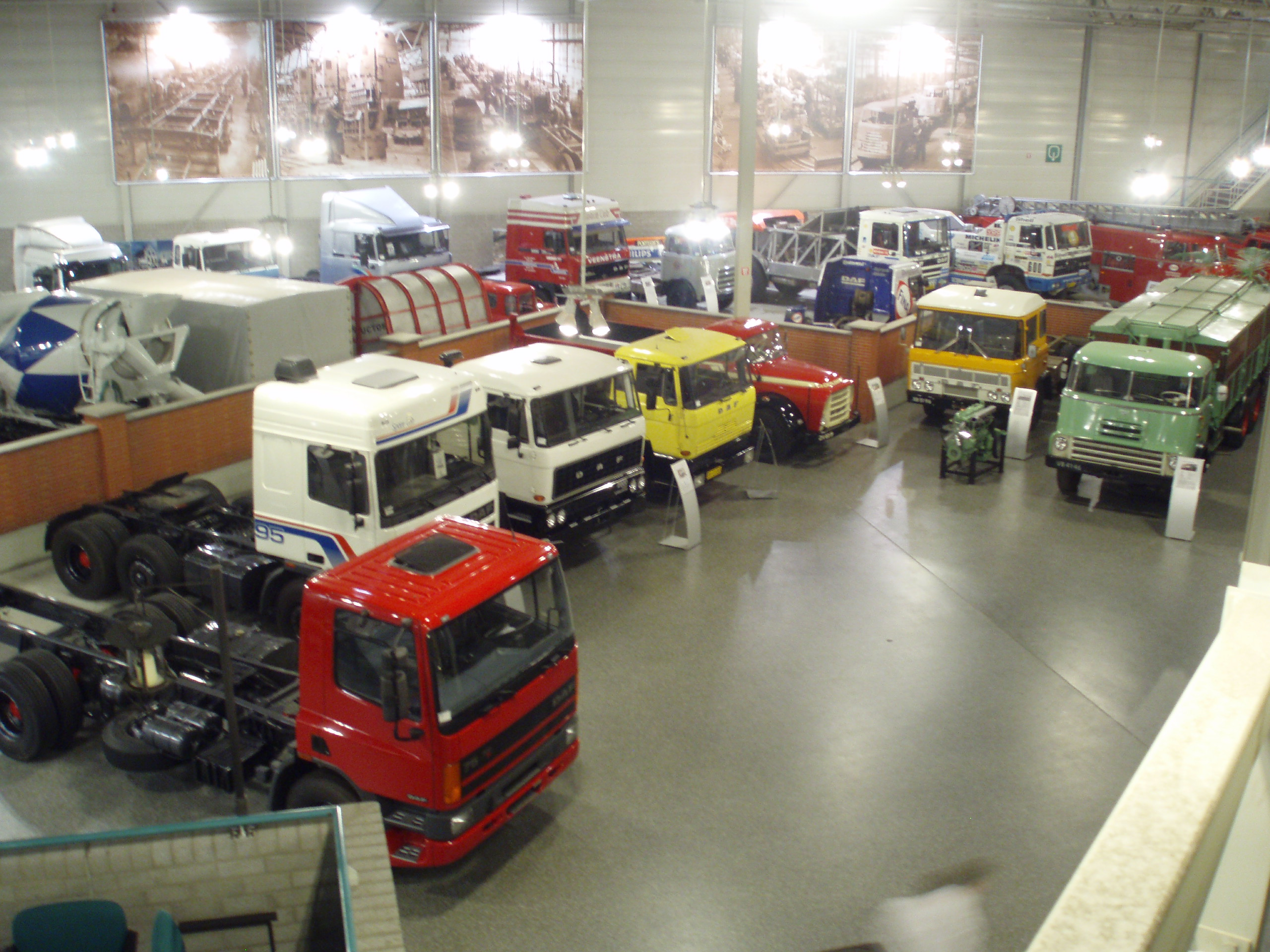
Various DAF Trucks at the DAF Museum, Eindhoven

DAF cars had the image of being slow. The company tried to change this image with entries in rallies and races, such as their entry in the London–Sydney Marathon.

They were pioneers with continuously variable automatic transmission called Variomatic.

A DAF car was used in Albie Mangle's "World Safari" movie of 1977.

=== Truck racing ===
- 1980s: DAF trucks started competing in the Dakar Rally, winning in 1982, 1985 and 1987. In the later years, they competed with a twin engine trucks: the 1986 TurboTwin, the 1987 TurboTwin II and the 1988 X1. The later producing a combined power output of 1,220 PS (900 kW).
- 1988: Two trucks were entered into the Paris-Dakar rally: the X1 and X2. Jan de Rooy's lorry was running third overall, beating the Peugeot 405 T16's on speed, when DAF's other lorry, driven by Theo van de Rijt, was involved in a crash. His co driver Kees Van Loevezijn was fatally injured, and the other two occupants of the lorry narrowly escaped the same fate. DAF withdrew from the event following the crash.
- 1996: DAF started competing in the European Truck Racing Championship series, first not very successful, but by 1999, they almost became champions. Then to everyone's surprise, it withdrew.
- 2002: DAF competed in the Dakar rally, with Jan de Rooy and his son Gerard.
- 2003: DAF competed in the Dakar rally, winning numerous stages before Gerard de Rooy crashed.
- 2004: DAF competed in the Dakar rally, powering six race lorries. Jan en Gerard de Rooy, the team Tridec, The team Hans Bekx with two trucks and the GINAF Rally Power team (Note that four trucks were built by DAF, two by GINAF).
- 2005: Hans Bekx almost finished second overall in the lorry division, before being removed from the competition because of an irregularity, much to the surprise of the (mostly Dutch) fans.
- 2006: Jan and Gerard de Rooy were excluded from the Dakar rally because of paperwork issues.

== List of CEOs ==
- 1965 - 1990 Richard Nagtegaal
- 1990 - 2011 Frans Nagtegaal
- 2011 - present Harry Wolters

== Current models ==
- LF series
- CF series
- XF series
- XG series
- XG+ series
- XD series
- XB series

== See also ==
- DAF NV
- GINAF
- Leyland Trucks
- Leyland DAF
- Pegaso Troner
- VDL Bus & Coach
