= Variomatic =

Continuously variable transmission by Dutch carmaker DAF

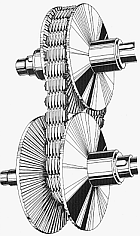
Belt and pulleys of a Van Doorne transmission

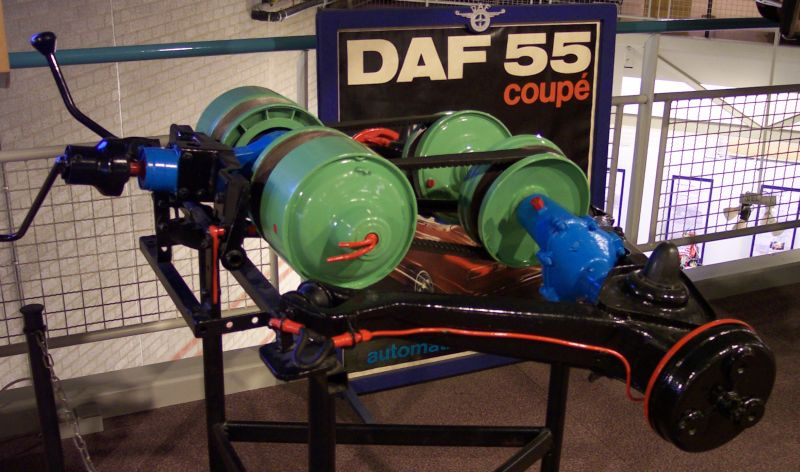
Variomatic transmission and rear axle. The larger green drums on the left contain the vacuum mechanism that controls the variable pulleys. The rear wheels are driven by separate belts, eliminating the need for a differential.

Variomatic is the continuously variable transmission (CVT) of the Dutch car manufacturer DAF, originally developed by Christoffel Sellenraad. It is a stepless, fully-automatic transmission, consisting of a V-shaped drive-belt, and two pulleys, each of two cones, whose effective diameter can be changed so that the "V" belt runs nearer the spindle or nearer the rim, depending on the separation of the cones. These are synchronized so that the belt always remains at the same optimal tension.

== History ==
Patented by Milton Reeves in 1889 in the USS and in Fouillaron in 1898. “To solve a thorny weaving problem, the engineer developed a variator system that prevented the thread from cutting when starting the looms”.

In 1904, the Fouillaron type G tonneau road vehicle was equipped with a wooden Tonneau body and a De Dion 6 HP single-cylinder engine; the car did not exceed 25 km/h. This vehicle has a very original gear transmission system with extendable pulleys. This invention, which he further developed and adapted to machine tools, was later acquired by the Dutch car manufacturer DAF, and developed into the Variomatic transmission, since continued by a separate company called DVT.

The Variomatic was the first commercially successful CVT (as opposed to shifting between separate gears), first marketed on the DAF 600. In theory, this always produces the optimum torque. The Variomatic was introduced by DAF in 1958, also putting an automatic gearbox in the Netherlands for the first time.

== Efficiency ==
Because most of the time the engine runs at its most economical speed, the fuel consumption of this car was acceptable, although the fuel efficiency of any mechanical CVT is about 70% (then) to 75% now (Bosch).

== Reversing ==
Because the system does not have separate gears, but one (continuously shifting) gear and a separate 'reverse mode' (as opposed to reverse gear), the transmission works in reverse as well, giving it the side effect that one can drive backwards as fast as forwards. As a result, in the former Dutch annual backward driving world championship, the DAFs had to be put in a separate competition because no other car could keep up.

== VDT ==
Manual transmission remains dominant in Europe. When DAF was acquired by Volvo in 1974, the Variomatic patents were transferred to a company called VDT (Van Doorne Transmissie), later acquired by Bosch in 1995. VDT continued the development of the CVT and introduced a push-belt system in the Ford Fiesta and Fiat Uno.

== Operation ==
=== Gear ratio ===
The final drive has two pulleys with moveable conical drums. The distance between the drums is controlled by the engine vacuum in the inlet manifold and engine RPM, through centrifugal weights inside the drums. Between the two pulleys runs a drive belt. As a result of the change in the distance of the conical drums in both pulleys, the diameters and so also the reduction ratio changes continuously.

=== Differential ===
Huron-Cosworth H4A hillclimb prototype with Variomatic transmission

With the DAF 600 - 55, each rear wheel was propelled individually by a pair of conical drums and drive belt with the effect of a limited-slip differential: if a drive wheel on slippery road revs up, the other wheel can still transfer the full torque. This results in unusually good traction characteristics, which were also a reason for the successes of the DAFs in rallying. There were several disadvantages that accompanied the lack of a true differential gear. Although each belt could settle (independent of the other) into its optimum position, thus allowing for wheel speed variation, the system was slow to operate and depended on the pulleys being turned. This led to rapid tire wear and placed stress on other transmission components. Snapped drive shafts were common. Low-speed handling in icy conditions was interesting as the system tended to drive the car forward against the influence of the steered wheels. Later cars, the 46, 66, and Volvo variants were fitted with a differentially geared axle. A version with a differential was developed by Williams in the 1993 Williams FW15C CVT Formula One car, but it was banned before being raced. In testing there were problems with the heat production.

== Motorscooters ==
The Variomatic is also used in today's motorscooters. It has been a standard part of all common scooters since 1985, and several companies such as Malossi, Polini, Doppler, and Stage6 are offering tuning clutches and variomatic for most common 50, 70 and 125 cc scooters.

== Steel link belts ==
The modern CVT works according to the same principle of split pulleys allowing infinitely variable gear ratios. Rather than the pulled rubber drive belts as originally used by DAF, the modern transmission is made more durable by the use of steel link belts that are pushed by their pulleys. This improvement was pioneered by Fiat, Ford, and Van Doorne in the Netherlands from the late 1970s. The gearbox is also under electronic control.

One version that incorporates the switch from rubber to steel belts was called the Transmatic.

== Availability ==
DAF's Van Doorne's Transmissie is still operating (as of November 2015) in Tilburg, Netherlands. It changed affiliations from the DAF group to Bosch in 1995.

The CVT is available from brands such as Audi, Honda, BMW Mini, and Subaru. Tata Motors from India intended to use a Variomatic transmission in its $2500 Nano. The Nissan Primera is offered with this transmission.
