= DAF 46 =

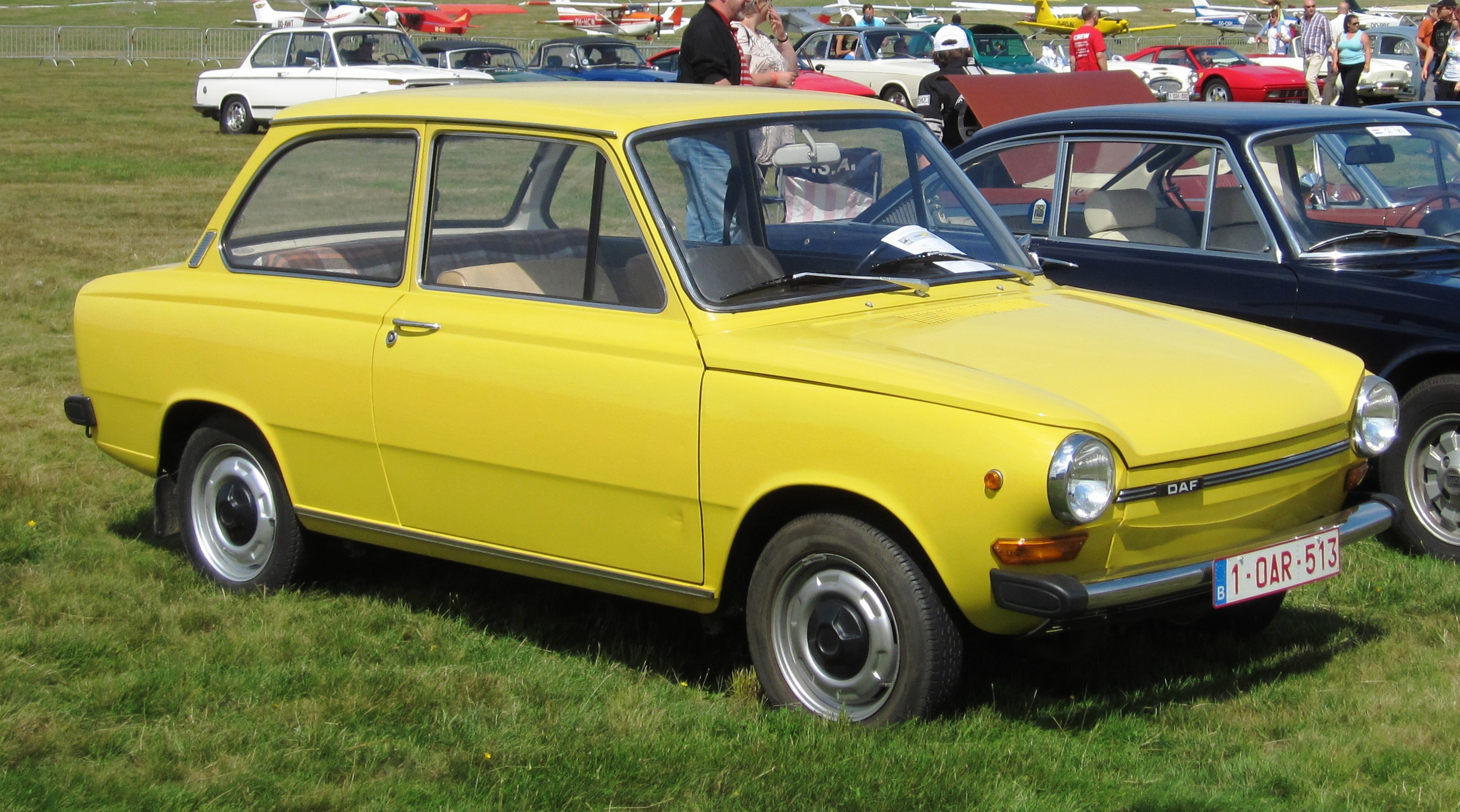
- 1976 DAF 46 Super Luxe

Overview
- Manufacturer: DAF
- Production: 1974–1976; 32,353 produced
- Assembly: Netherlands: Born (DAF Born)
- Designer: Giovanni Michelotti

Body and chassis
- Class: Small family car
- Body style: saloon; estate car; delivery car
- Layout: FR layout

Powertrain
- Engine: 844 cc flat twin
- Transmission: Variomatic

Dimensions
- Wheelbase: 2,248 mm (88.5 in)
- Length: 3,848 mm (151.5 in)
- Width: 1,530 mm (60 in)
- Height: 1,445 mm (56.9 in)
- Curb weight: 724 kg (1,596 lb)

Chronology
- Predecessor: DAF 44
- Successor: Volvo 66

The DAF 46 is a small family car that was manufactured by the Dutch company DAF. It was introduced in November 1974 to replace the 44, although at the time it was announced that the two cars would be sold "alongside" one another, suggesting that there were still substantial stocks of the earlier model awaiting customers.

In February 1976, at the relaunch of the Volvo 66 (formerly the DAF 66), it was announced that the DAF 46 would be phased out during 1976, after which 'special measures' would ensure adequate parts and service backup despite the disappearance of the DAF brand from passenger car show rooms.

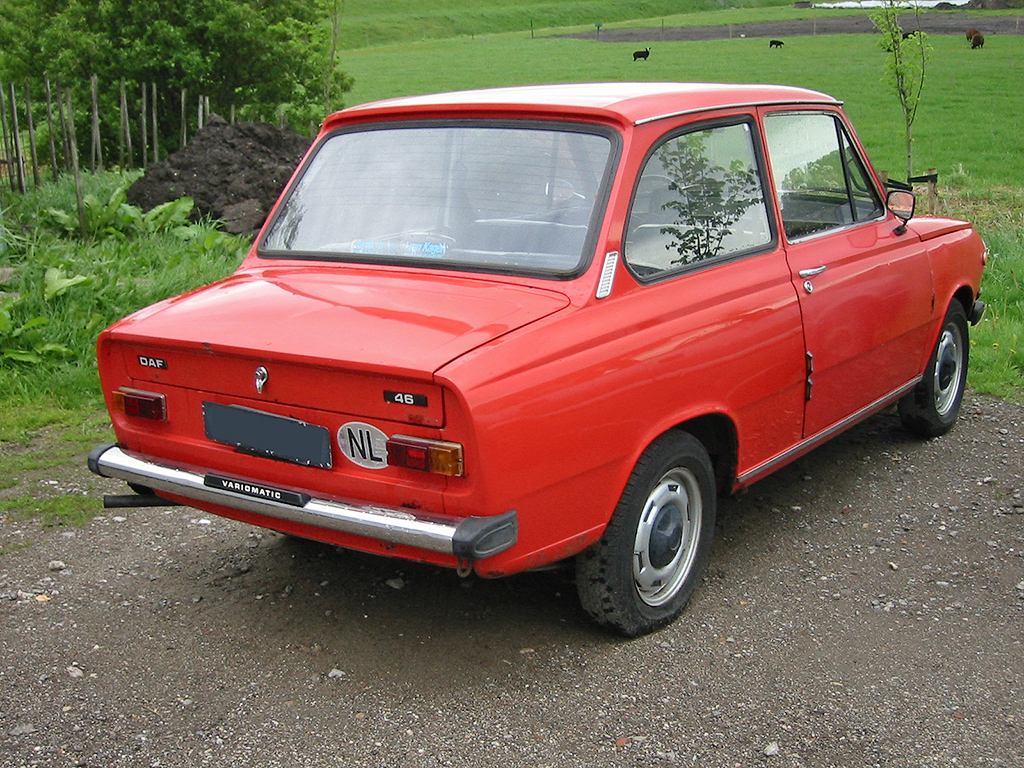
Rear view

The DAF 46 was carpeted throughout and equipped with cloth covered reclining seats. It also had a redesigned gear lever and additional dash mounted warning lights. Out of sight of the driver was a de Dion rear axle, which DAF had fitted two years earlier to their more powerful model when replacing the 55 with the DAF 66: the car retained its defining variomatic transmission, but this was now coupled with a conventional differential which was said to improve noise levels and extend drive-belt life. Reports suggest that the DAF 46 had safer handling than its predecessor, but acceleration was nonetheless considerably slower, at a time when most European manufacturers were steadily increasing top speed and acceleration when they introduced model upgrades.

A total of 32,353 DAF 46s were produced.
