= Renault Cléon-Fonte engine =

Cléon-Fonte engine
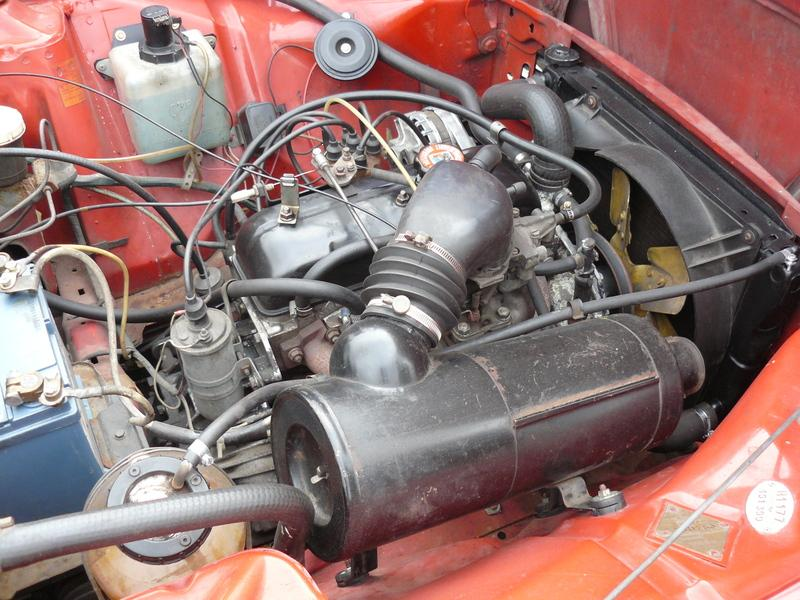

Overview
- Manufacturer: Renault; Dacia
- Also called: Sierra engine, C-Type engine
- Production: 1962–2004

Layout
- Configuration: Inline-four
- Displacement: 956 cc (1.0 L); 1,022 cc (1.0 L); 1,037 cc (1.0 L); 1,108 cc (1.1 L); 1,118 cc (1.1 L); 1,149 cc (1.1 L); 1,185 cc (1.2 L); 1,239 cc (1.2 L); 1,250 cc (1.3 L); 1,255 cc (1.3 L); 1,289 cc (1.3 L); 1,296 cc (1.3 L); 1,341 cc (1.3 L); 1,372 cc (1.4 L); 1,390 cc (1.4 L); 1,397 cc (1.4 L); 1,434 cc (1.4 L); 1,527 cc (1.5 L); 1,555 cc (1.6 L); 1,557 cc (1.6 L); 1,565 cc (1.6 L); 1,578 cc (1.6 L)
- Cylinder bore: 61.4 mm (2.42 in); 65 mm (2.56 in); 67.7 mm (2.67 in); 68 mm (2.68 in); 70 mm (2.76 in); 71.5 mm (2.81 in); 71.9 mm (2.83 in); 73 mm (2.87 in); 74 mm (2.91 in); 74.5 mm (2.93 in); 75.3 mm (2.96 in); 75.7 mm (2.98 in); 75.8 mm (2.98 in); 76 mm (2.99 in); 77 mm (3.03 in)
- Piston stroke: 72 mm (2.83 in); 77 mm (3.03 in); 79 mm (3.11 in); 82 mm (3.23 in); 83.5 mm (3.29 in); 83.6 mm (3.29 in); 84 mm (3.31 in); 87 mm (3.43 in)
- Cylinder block material: Cast Iron
- Cylinder head material: Aluminium
- Valvetrain: OHV 2 valves x cyl.

RPM range
- Idle speed: 850
- Max. engine speed: 6250

Combustion
- Turbocharger: In some versions
- Fuel system: Single or dual Solex carburettor Fuel injection
- Fuel type: Petrol
- Cooling system: Water-cooled

Output
- Power output: 40–385 bhp (30–287 kW; 41–390 PS)
- Torque output: 90–123 N⋅m; 67–90 lbf⋅ft (9.2–12.5 kg⋅m) (1.2 L)

Chronology
- Predecessor: Billancourt engine
- Successor: Energy engine D-Type engine

The Cléon-Fonte engine is a family of inline four-cylinder automobile engines developed and manufactured by Renault. It has also been called the Sierra engine, the C-engine, or the C-Type. It has been in continuous production by Renault or a licensee from 1962 to 2004. After about three decades of use in Renault's compact models, it was gradually replaced by the E-type engine from the late 1980s onward.

The C-type is a water-cooled design, with a wet linered cast iron block with five main bearings and a single, chain-driven cam-in-block mounted high on the side that drives two overhead valves per cylinder in an aluminum cylinder head via short pushrods and rocker arms.

== History ==
When production started in 1962, the engine was called the "Sierra", but was soon renamed the "Cléon-Fonte", taking its name from the new Renault factory where it was first manufactured. This four-cylinder provided power for several generations of Renaults, with displacements of 956 to 1,565 cc (1.0 to 1.6 L). Cars fitted with the engine range from the Floride/Caravelle through the first generation Twingo of 1993, thirty years after this power unit was presented to the press at Geneva.

Technical adaptations enabled the production of this engine in many displacements in single and dual carburettor forms, later with fuel injection, with or without turbo. The Cléon-Fonte was coupled initially to four-speed manual transmissions, and then later five speed and automatic gearboxes according to its applications and the natural progress of the automotive industry.

It was fitted in one form or another to an impressive list of Renault models, in rear-, mid- or front-engined (longitudinal or transverse) configurations, including: Floride/Caravelle, Alpine A110, R4, R5 (Le Car in the USA), R6, R7 (Siete), R8/R10, R9/R11 (Alliance/Encore in USA), R12, R15, R18, R19, R21 (Export), Estafette, Traffic 1, Express (Rapid / Extra), Fuego, Twingo, Clio 1, not to mention the Renault R12 based Dacia 1300/1310 range produced from 1969 to 2004. On Monday, 29 November 2004, Dacia produced the last C-engine, which was a 1.6 litre, fuel injected model, producing 68 horsepower and with the serial number 2527155. The C-engine stopped production four months after that of the Dacia 1310. Dacia continues to manufacture components of the Cléon-Fonte engine for the purposes of service in Romania and abroad. In total, more than 27 million units of the Cléon-Fonte were produced by Renault and Dacia since its launch, 15 million of which were built in France. This engine was also assembled in Portugal, Spain, Turkey, Colombia and Argentina.

In France, the Cléon-Fonte ended its career in December 1996 in the Twingo and Clio which used the 1,239 cc (1.2 L) C3G, and the Supercinq "Bye Bye", fitted with the 1,390 cc (1.4 L) C3J; this also marked the end of Renault 5 production. In total, this engine had an unusually long career: nearly half a century.

27,277,306 Cléon-Fonte engines were manufactured in 42 years, a record in Europe (some American V8 have far exceeded this number). The Renault engine has powered many different cars, mounted in various positions: rear mounted rear drive, front mounted rear drive, longitudinal or transverse front wheel drive.

=== Design ===
In the late 1950s, Renault engineering, led by the engineer Fernand Picard, decided to develop a modern version of the "Billancourt engine" from the Dauphine for the future Renault 8 model. The engineer René Vuaillat designed an all-new small four-cylinder engine which would eventually evolve from 956 to 1,108 cc (1.0 to 1.1 L). Consisting of a cast iron block topped with an aluminum cylinder head, this engine was characterized by its camshaft placed high in the block with short pushrods, and, unusually for the time, five crankshaft bearings. From the first test, it showed more torque and considerably more power than the 845 cc (0.8 L) "Billancourt", whose design dated back to 1944. It was baptized the "Sierra", because at that time, Renault had not yet adopted its later scheme of designating each engine design with a letter. It was later that it took the name "Cléon", referring to the plant where it was made, combined with "Fonte" (meaning "cast-iron" in French) to distinguish it from the aluminum-block Renault 16 Cléon-Alu engine; it was later shortened to the "C engine."

The engine made its official debut at the Geneva Motor Show in the new 1962 Renault Floride S, replacing the 845 cc (0.8 L) 40 PS (29 kW; 39 hp) Dauphine Gordini. The 956 cc (1.0 L) capacity, which delivered a dozen additional horsepower, (51 PS (38 kW; 50 hp) SAE), a few months later was seen in the new R8 sedan. For racing and motorsport versions, Amédée Gordini was responsible for designing a hemispherical combustion chambered head allowing 85–90 PS (63–66 kW; 84–89 hp); for a 1000 cc version as opposed to 70 PS (51 kW; 69 hp) for the previous 700 cc Gordini engine. Gordini revealed some weaknesses in the rigidity of the block which could lead to blown head gaskets; this prompted Renault to stiffen the block slightly.

1963 saw an 1,108 cc (1.1 L) version of the engine introduced. This was fitted to the latest version of Renault Floride/Caravelle, a car whose timid performance was greatly improved. The bore of the 1,108 cc (1.1 L) was increased to 70 mm (2.76 in), giving greater torque and power.

In the late 1960s, the Cléon-Fonte was used in most small Renaults. Installed in both the R8 and R10 sedans of the time, it was also produced in Valladolid, Spain. At the end of 1966, to power the new R8 Gordini 1300, it received a new block with a specific lateral offset crankshaft, this time 1,255 cc (1.3 L) in capacity and producing 88 PS (65 kW; 87 hp) DIN.

At the close of 1969, Renault launched its front-wheel drive R12 with the "Cléon-Fonte", now known as the "C-Engine", installed ahead of the driver. It was reworked to a displacement of 1,289 cc (1.3 L) producing 54 PS (40 kW; 53 hp) and had a uniform spacing between the cylinders. Despite the engine's flexibility, this version was not powerful enough for the sportier versions of the R12 and Alpine Berlinetta, but was installed in the R12 and R15 TL. Mated to a new front drive transaxle, the 956 cc (1.0 L) version of the C-engine was found under the hood of the R6, and later the R5.

In this time period, Renault chose small saloon cars to represent the company in automobile racing. To do this, Renault began with work similar to that Gordini had done 10 years earlier, but at a much lower cost. The "Cléon-Fonte", now with a new hemispherical head, was pushed to 1,397 cc (1.4 L) producing 93 PS (68 kW; 92 hp) in the 1976 R5 Alpine/Gordini; power output increased to 110 PS (81 kW; 108 hp) in 1981 for the R5 Alpine/Gordini Turbo.

Meanwhile, the R4 GTL had received the 1,108 cc (1.1 L) version; the basic model retained its ancient "Billancourt" 845cc engine, but in 1986 the R4 was entirely C-engine powered, the base model receiving the 956 cc (1.0 L) unit. The new R18, which succeeded the R12, received the 1,397 cc (1.4 L) version of this engine, with a standard cylinder head, and several options for power specifications. It is in this capacity, but now in a transverse position, this unit found its way under the hood of the R9, (car of the year 1982) and its sister R11, then under the Super 5 in 1985.

The Renault 9 and 11 were important developments for Renault as they inaugurated a new technical philosophy that would be used on many models. Indeed, the chassis was reused for the Renault 19, Megane 1 and Scenic 1; derivatives were used for the Super 5, Express, Clio 1, Clio 2, Kangoo 1 and Twingo 2. The Renault 9 and Renault 11 were the first cars to use a Renault engine in a transverse position, which gave rise to the "JB" gearbox which was used until the Twingo 2.

Renault chose to use the turbocharged 1.4 L (1,397 cc) Cléon engine in several cars of the early 1980s. The pushrod Cléon engine was chosen for its sturdiness and low cost. For cost concerns it was fitted with a Solex carburetor, albeit a special unit made from magnesium in order to withstand the high heat from the turbocharger.

At the end of 1980, thanks to a big turbo, the impressive 160 PS (118 kW; 158 hp) R5 Turbo was launched. Mounted in a mid-engined position for the first time, this 1397cc unit was coupled to the transmission of the R30 TX and drove the rear wheels. The R5 Turbo engaged in group B rallying and gradually saw its power rise from 200–300 PS (147–221 kW; 197–296 hp) peaking at 360 PS (265 kW; 355 hp) in 1.5 L (1,527 cc) form in 1985; the C-engine hit 385 PS (283 kW; 380 hp) in 1987 on the tour versions of the championship Blockbuster, benefiting from the 1500 turbo technology in Formula 1, which included the injection of water into the intake.

After the arrival of the Renault R19 and Clio in the early 1990s, this engine (which however has adapted very well to changing emission standards, with injection and catalytic converters) lived its last days alongside its replacement, the "Energy" engine.

When the Renault 14 was released in 1976, it was thought that the Cléon-Fonte engine would disappear since the 14 was equipped with the PSA-Renault X-Type engine of the Society Française de Mécanique common to Peugeot and Renault. This collaboration with the main competitor at the time was badly perceived by customers and the Renault service network. So, for the Renault 9 and Renault 11 to replace the Renault 14, Renault returned to the Cléon-Fonte engine that was already starting to be considered an antique in the early 80s. The Renault 9 gave a second life to the Cléon-Fonte, which was mounted transversely, a first for Renault, and coupled to the JB gearbox.

Renault was about to stop production of this engine when the Twingo required a compact unit, marking its return to manufacture, this time bored out to 1.2 L (1,239 cc). Many journalists panned the Twingo for using this engine. The Energy and Clio R19 engine, due to its overhead cam, hemispherical cylinder head design with exhaust ports at the front of the head, could not go under the hood of the little Twingo. However, in late 1996, the new 1.1 L (1,149 cc) D7F engine, which was more modern, replaced the long serving Cléon engine in the base model Clio and the Twingo.

The Cléon-Fonte engine was thus resurrected twice, first by the Renault 9 in 1981 and again in 1993 by the Twingo.

== Engine development ==
The Cléon-Fonte engine evolved into the "Energy engine", first seen in the Renault 19. The engine block is greatly modified as the camshaft is moved to the cylinder head and the chain drive is replaced by belt drive. The cylinder head is completely new, adopting an overhead camshaft driven by a toothed timing belt. The 1,390 cc (1.4 L) "Energy engine" and 1,390 cc (1.4 L) "Cléon-Fonte" have the same stroke and bore.

Subsequently, the "Energy engine" evolved into the "K engine" which appeared in the Mégane 1. The main change from the Energy is the cylinders bored directly into the iron block. The head of the Energy is retained in 8 valve versions, whilst 16V versions are also available, as are diesels (Engine K9K — 1.5 dCi).

== Sports applications ==
- Renault 8 Gordini
- Alpine A110
- Renault 5 LS
- Renault 5 Alpine
- Renault 5 Alpine Turbo
- Renault 5 Turbo and Turbo 2
- Renault 9 GTS
- Renault 9 Turbo
- Renault 11 Turbo
- Renault Super 5 GT Turbo
- Renault Super 5 TS
- Dacia 1410 Sport
- Dacia Nova GT
- ARO 10 Duster
- DAF 55 Marathon
- DAF 66 Marathon
- René Bonnet Djet

=== Common cylinder capacities ===
| Engine types | Displacement | Bore and stroke |
|---|---|---|
| 689 — C1C | 956 cc (1.0 L) | 65 mm × 72 mm (2.56 in × 2.83 in) |
| 688 — 804 * — C1E | 1,108 cc (1.1 L) | 70 mm × 72 mm (2.76 in × 2.83 in) |
| C1G | 1,237 cc (1.2 L) | 71.5 mm × 77 mm (2.81 in × 3.03 in) |
| C3G | 1,239 cc (1.2 L) | 74 mm × 72 mm (2.91 in × 2.83 in) |
| 812 | 1,255 cc (1.3 L) | 74.5 mm × 72 mm (2.93 in × 2.83 in) |
| 810 — C1H | 1,289 cc (1.3 L) | 73 mm × 77 mm (2.87 in × 3.03 in) |
| 804 * | 1,296 cc (1.3 L) | 75.7 mm × 72 mm (2.98 in × 2.83 in) |
| C3J | 1,390 cc (1.4 L) | 75.8 mm × 77 mm (2.98 in × 3.03 in) |
| 840 — 847 — C1J — C2J — C3J — C6J — C7J | 1,397 cc (1.4 L) | 76 mm × 77 mm (2.99 in × 3.03 in) |

* 1,108 cc (1.1 L) Gordini and 1,296 cc (1.3 L) Gordini have the distinction of having the same engine types : 804 , despite the difference in displacement. These two engines will equip Renault 8 Gordini and Alpine A110.

=== Unusual and competition capacities ===
| Engine types | Displacement | Bore x stroke | Remark |
|---|---|---|---|
| 813 | 852 cc (0.9 L) | 61.4 mm × 72 mm (2.42 in × 2.83 in) | Spain (Fasa-Renault) R4 F4 (1972–1976) |
| | 996 cc (1.0 L) | 71.5 mm × 77 mm (2.81 in × 3.03 in) | René Bonnet Djet II/III/IV (DOHC) |
| M1000 | 1,022 cc (1.0 L) | 65 mm × 77 mm (2.56 in × 3.03 in) | Argentina |
| 850 | 1,037 cc (1.0 L) | 67.7 mm × 72 mm (2.67 in × 2.83 in) | Spain (Fasa-Renault) R7 (1974–1980), R5 GTL, R6 TL (1976–1980) |
| M1100 | 1,118 cc (1.1 L) | 68 mm × 77 mm (2.68 in × 3.03 in) | Argentina |
| | 1,185 cc (1.2 L) | 70 mm × 77 mm (2.76 in × 3.03 in) | Dacia |
| | 1,250 cc (1.3 L) | 71.9 mm × 77 mm (2.83 in × 3.03 in) | Australia (R12) |
| | 1,341 cc (1.3 L) | 71.5 mm × 83.5 mm (2.81 in × 3.29 in) | Ford Brazil |
| | 1,372 cc (1.4 L) | 75.3 mm × 77 mm (2.96 in × 3.03 in) | Ford Brazil |
| C7K | 1,430 cc (1.4 L) | 76 mm × 79 mm (2.99 in × 3.11 in) | R5 Turbo 2 competition engine |
| | 1,434 cc (1.4 L) | 77 mm × 77 mm (3.03 in × 3.03 in) | 1440cc competition engine — R12 & Alpine |
| | 1,527 cc (1.5 L) | 77 mm × 82 mm (3.03 in × 3.23 in) | R5 Maxi-Turbo |
| | 1,555 cc (1.6 L) | 77 mm × 83.5 mm (3.03 in × 3.29 in) | Ford Brazil |
| | 1,557 cc (1.6 L) | 77 mm × 83.6 mm (3.03 in × 3.29 in) | Dacia |
| C1L — C2L — C3L | 1,565 cc (1.6 L) | 77 mm × 84 mm (3.03 in × 3.31 in) | Argentina: Clio and R19 |
| | 1,578 cc (1.6 L) | 76 mm × 87 mm (2.99 in × 3.43 in) | Dacia |
| | 1,596 cc (1.6 L) | 76 mm × 88 mm (2.99 in × 3.46 in) | Volvo 343 Oëttinger |

== Other manufacturers ==
=== DAF and Volvo ===
Renault supplied the 1108 cc Cléon-Fonte to DAF, who dubbed it the B110 and used it in their DAF 55 model. DAF also made a higher output version with a different cam, distributor, and carb jetting which they dubbed the BR110. Renault later also supplied the 1289 cc engine, which DAF named the B130 and offered as an alternative to the B110 in the DAF 66. After Volvo took over DAF, they launched the Volvo 66, which was a rebadged DAF 66, with the same engine options. When the Volvo 300 series was launched it featured a 1397 cc B14, although in some markets a 1289 cc version, called the B13, was also available.

=== Ford ===
Ford do Brasil acquired manufacturing rights for the Cléon-Fonte engine when they took over Willys' Brazilian operation in the late 1960s. The engine was part of the Renault-based "Projeto M" (Project M) joint venture between Willys do Brasil and Renault, which came to market as the Ford Corcel in 1968. The first engines from Ford displaced 1289 cc. This was later increased, first to 1372 cc, then to 1555 cc.

In 1983 Ford designed a new cylinder head for the engine, and made some internal changes. They named the result the Ford CHT engine. When it debuted in 1983 in the Brazilian MkIII Escort, the CHT was offered in 1555 cc and 1341 cc sizes, with a 997 cc version coming later with changes to Brazilian taxes on vehicles.

=== Volkswagen ===
From 1987 to 1996, Ford and Volkswagen in Brazil operated as a joint venture under the name AutoLatina. During this time, the CHT was renamed as the AE engine, for Alta Economia (High Economy). Volkswagen began selling the Ford Escort-based Volkswagen Logus two-door coupé with an AE-1600 option. VW also adapted the AE engine to their own Volkswagen Gol and its derivative models, initially offered the AE-1600 and then later the AE-1000.

== CxC ==
The C1C (original name "689") displaces 1.0 L (956 cc):

Applications:
- Renault 8 base (1962–1968);
- Renault Floride S (1962–1963);
- Renault Caravelle base (1963–1968);
- Renault 5 TL (1972–1979);
- Renault 5 Super 5 TC 1985
- Renault Extra 1986
- Alpine-Renault A110 1.0 (1962–1964);
- Renault 6 base (only for the Spanish Market);
- Renault 4 TL (1986–1992).

== CxE ==
The C1E (original name "688") displaces 1.1 L (1,108 cc).

Applications:
- Renault 8 Major (1964–1965);
- Renault 8 base (1968–1973);
- Renault 10 base (1965–1971);
- Renault 5 (1972–1985);
- Renault 4 (1978–1994);
- Renault 5 Super 5 (1985);
- Renault R9 (1982–1989);
- Renault R11 (1983–1989);
- Renault Clio (1991–1994);
- Renault Extra (1986);
- Renault Estafette (1962–1968);
- Dacia 1100 (1968–1971);
- DAF 55 (1967–1972); called B110 by DAF
- DAF 66 (1972–1975); called B110 by DAF
- Volvo 66 1.1 (1975–1980); called B110 by Volvo
- René Bonnet Le Mans (1962–1964);
- René Bonnet/Matra Djet (1964–1967).
- DTN/DTR 40 Marine engine(1965–1978)

== CxG ==
The C1G and C3G displace 1.2 L (1,237 or 1,239 cc or 75.5 or 75.6 cu in respectively) and produces 55 PS (40 kW; 54 bhp) at 5,300 rpm, and 90 N⋅m (66 lb⋅ft) at 2,800 rpm with single-point fuel injection in the Twingo. The C1G was essentially a downsleeved version of the 1.3-litre 810 engine and was replaced by the C3G with almost identical displacement. This, however, was an oversquare, bored out version of the 1.1-liter C1E engine. The C3G was produced through July 1996.

Applications:
- C1G (1237 cc)
  - 1987–1990 Renault Super 5
  - 1985–1989 Renault R9
  - 1985–1989 Renault R11
  - 1988–1989 Renault R19
  - 1986– Renault Express
- C3G (1239 cc)
  - 1993–1996 Renault Twingo
  - 1995–1996 Renault Clio
  - 1995–1996 Renault Express

== CxH/810 ==
There was also the 810-type engine, with 1.3 L (1,289 cc) from a 73 mm × 77 mm (2.87 in × 3.03 in) bore and stroke. It was mostly taken out of production before the alphanumeric codes were introduced, although some late versions are called C1H. Power ranged from 32 to 47 kW (44 to 64 PS; 43 to 63 bhp).

Applications:
  - 1968–1972 Ford Corcel
  - 1969–1980 Renault 12 L, TL
  - 1972–1979 Renault 12 TS
  - 1969–2004 Dacia 1300/1310
  - 1970–1971 Renault 10
  - 1973–1975 DAF 66 Marathon, called the B130 by DAF
  - 1976–1980 Volvo 66, called the B130 by Volvo
  - 1976–1981 Renault 5, 5 Automatic

== CxJ ==
The C1J, C2J, C3J, and C6J displaces 1.4 L; 85.3 cu in (1,397 cc) from a bore x stroke of 76 mm × 77 mm (2.99 in × 3.03 in).

Applications:
- C1J
  - 1972–1985 Renault 5
  - 1984–1987 Renault Super 5
  - 1985–1991 Renault Super 5 Turbo
  - 1977–1994 Renault 12 (Argentina)
  - 1978–1984 Renault 6 (Argentina)
  - 1982–1989 Renault R9
  - 1985–1989 Renault R9 Turbo
  - 1983–1989 Renault R11
  - 1984–1989 Renault R11 Turbo
  - 1984–1985 Renault R18
  - 1988 Renault R19
  - 1986 Renault Extra
  - 1985–1989 Renault Trafic
  - 1983–1989 Renault 12 (Turkey)
  - 1989–2000 Renault 12 Toros (Turkey)
- C2J
  - 1984–1990 Renault Super 5
  - 1982–1989 Renault R9
  - 1983–1989 Renault R11
  - 1988–1994 Renault R19
  - 1985–1989 Renault R21
  - 1986 Renault Extra
- C3J
  - 1985 Renault 5 Super 5
  - 1985–1989 Renault R9
  - 1985–1989 Renault R11
  - 1988–1994 Renault R19
  - 1986 Renault Extra
- C6J
  - 1980–1984 Renault 5 Turbo
  - 1982–1984 Renault 5 Alpine Turbo
- Dacia 102.00/102.13/102.14/102.41 (Romanian variant)
  - 1983–2004 Dacia 1310/1410
- B14
  - 1976–1991 Volvo 340

== CxL ==
An Argentinian-developed engine, this was only available in Argentina, Brazil, Colombia and Turkey. It is derived from the CxJ and shares the dimensions with Renault's A-series engine displaces 1.6 L (1,565 cc). The major improvement was in the available torque up to 12.5 kg⋅m (123 N⋅m; 90 lbf⋅ft) at 3,000 rpm. The twin-carb version is called the C2L, while the single-point fuel injection version is the C3L.

- Brazil:
  - 1996–1999 Renault Clio RL, RN and RT
  - 1996–2001 Renault Express RN (C3L, monopoint injection version)
  - 1994–1998 Renault 19 RN, RL
- Colombia:
  - 1989 Renault 21 RS
  - 1989 Renault 9 TXE
  - 1990 Renault Étoile TS (21 TS) Saloon and Estate (Break)
  - 1996 Renault 19 1600
- Argentina:
  - 1989 Renault 18 GTS
  - 1989 Renault 11 TXE, RL, RN
  - 1989 Renault 9 GTL/RL TXE, RN
  - 1991 Renault 12 GTL
  - 1993 Renault 19 RN
  - 1996 Renault 19 RL
  - 1996 Renault Express RN (C3L, monopoint injection version)
  - 1997 Renault 19 RE
  - 1997 Renault Clio I (C3L version)
- Turkey:
  - 1993–1996 Renault 9 and 11 Fairway
  - 1991 Renault 12
  - Renault 19 1.6 RT
