= Tjorven (vehicle) =

Swedish delivery van

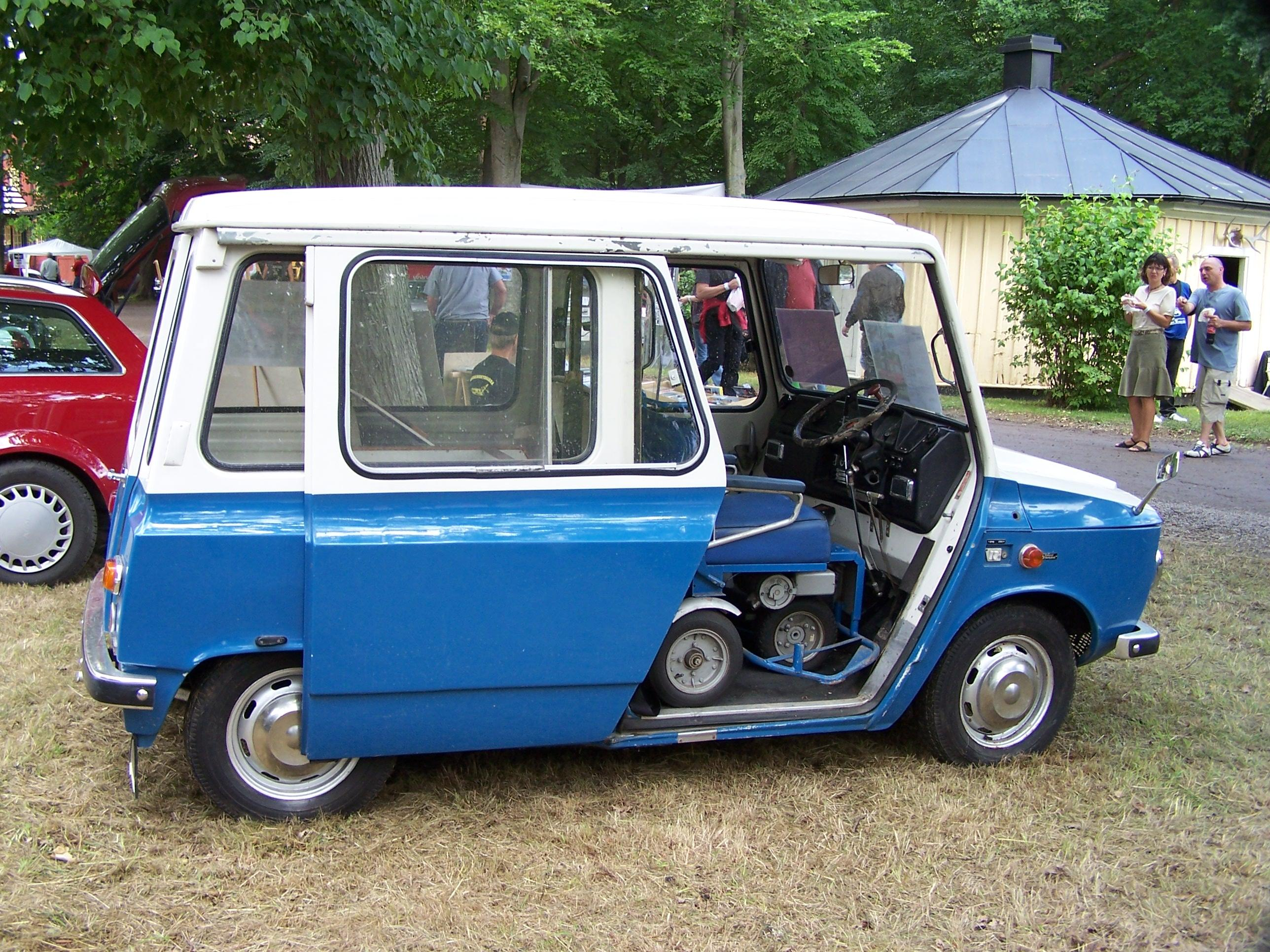
Tjorven, here in a version adapted for the handicapped

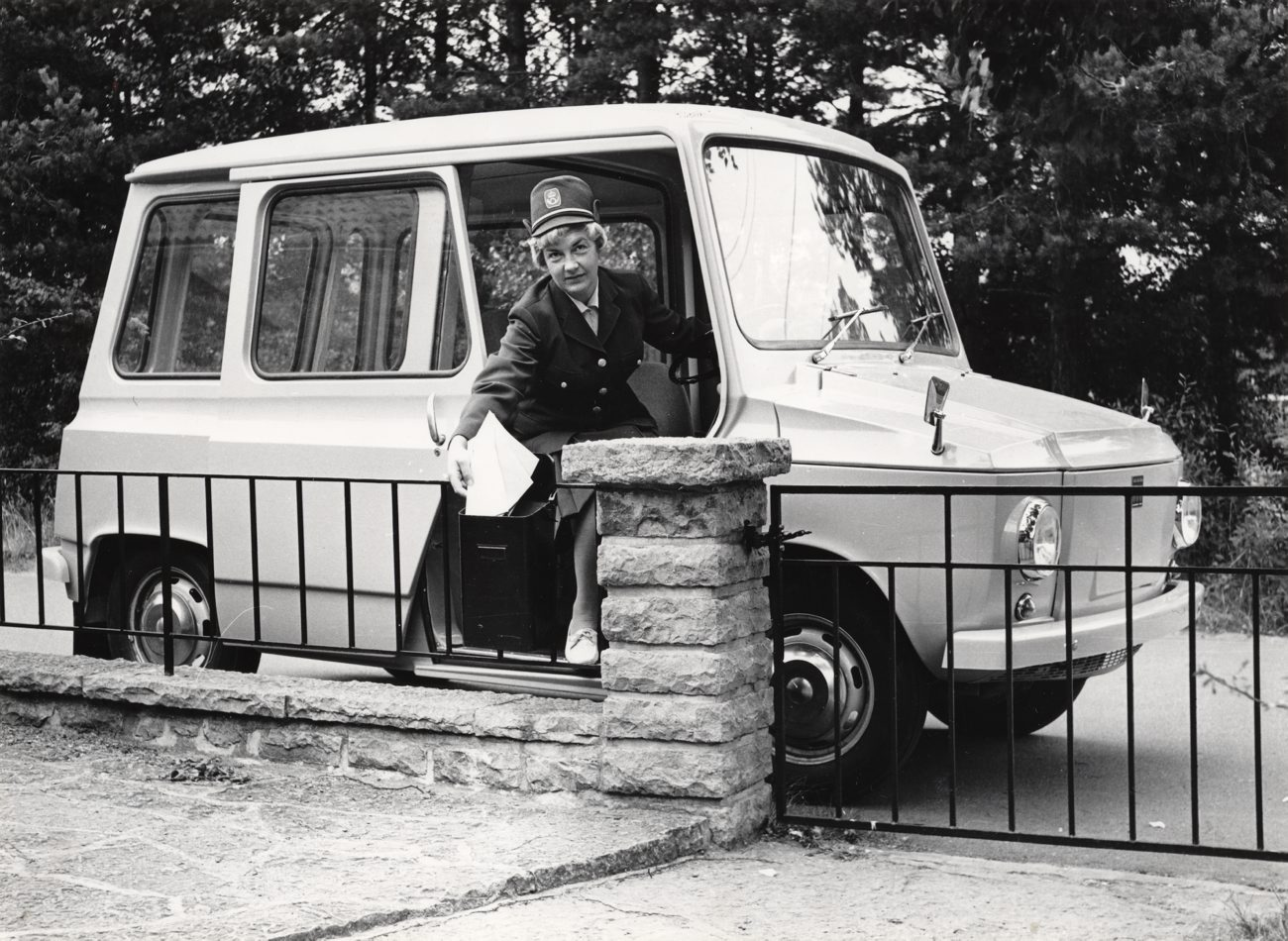
Tjorven in service as mail truck.

The Kalmar KVD440/441, also variously known as Tjorven or DAF Kalmar, is a delivery van based on the DAF 44, made in Sweden. The vehicle inherited the air-cooled, 844-cc boxer engine and Variomatic transmission from the DAF 44. The 440 was the postal version, while the 441 was intended for private buyers and had more comfortable front seats as its most notable revision. Kalmar also presented a pickup version (the "Last", meaning cargo in Swedish) and five-seater passenger version called the Kombi in October 1969, but neither entered production.

In 1963 the then Postverket (Swedish Mail) needed a new vehicle for mail delivery, and contacted Kalmar Verkstad, who developed and built it between 1968 and 1972. On the export market it was simply called Kalmar. In addition to the heating provided by the air-cooled engine, to provide appropriate heating for postmen, some units were fitted with a gasoline-powered Eberspächer heater under the driver's seat, with a dedicated exhaust pipe. The engine was not particularly durable and hurt the Tjorven's reputation, while causing significant warranty claims on the company.

"Tjorven" was a nickname given to the Kalmar as its frumpy but sympathetic appearance was reminiscent of a contemporary Swedish television character of that name. The design was by Swedish industrial designer Rune Monö.

It was right-hand drive for easy driver access to road side letter boxes, and frame-built with a fiberglass bodywork.

Production ended in 1972 with about 2,000 built, most of them for mail delivery. The Swedish air force used 12 of them for support functions such as collecting the brake chute for J35 Draken and filling up the pilot's oxygen. One of them was in use until 1976.
