= Renault Caravelle =

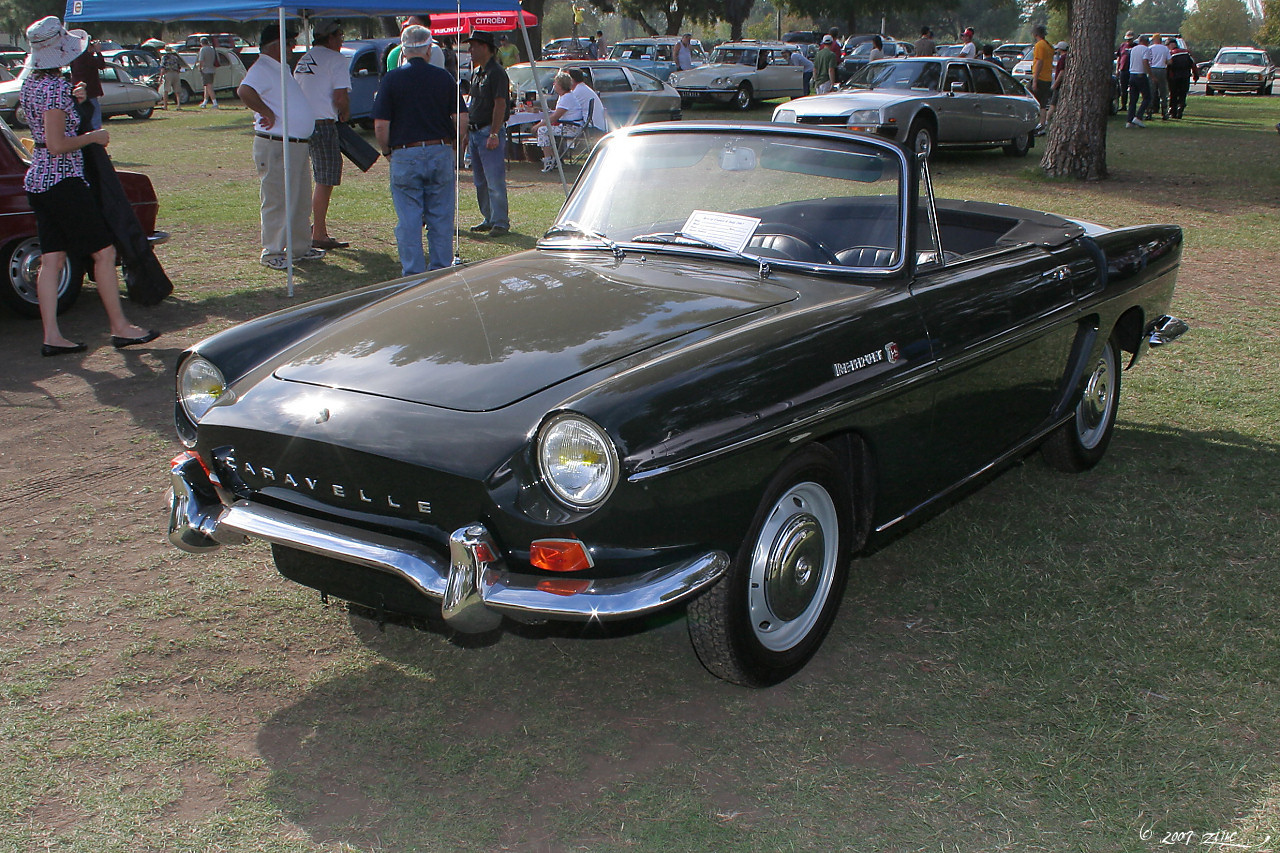
- Renault Caravelle cabriolet

Overview
- Manufacturer: Renault
- Also called: Renault Floride (1958–1962)
- Production: 1958–1968; 117,000 produced
- Assembly: France: Boulogne-Billancourt; Creil
- Designer: Pietro Frua at Carrozzeria Ghia

Body and chassis
- Class: Sports car (S); Roadster
- Body style: 2-door coupé 2-door cabriolet 2-door convertible
- Layout: RR layout
- Related: Renault Dauphine

Powertrain
- Engine: 845 cc 670 I4; 956 cc 689 I4; 1108 cc 688 I4
- Transmission: 4-speed manual all-synchromesh

Dimensions
- Wheelbase: 2,265 mm (89.2 in)
- Length: 4,265 mm (167.9 in)
- Width: 1,575 mm (62.0 in)
- Height: 1,320 mm (52.0 in)
- Curb weight: 822 kg (1,812 lb) (approx)

The Renault Caravelle is a sports car manufactured and marketed by Renault from 1958 to 1968 in a single generation — as a rear-engine, rear-drive, two/four-seater coupe or convertible designed by Pietro Frua of Carrozzeria Ghia, sharing its floorpan and engine with the Renault Dauphine.

The Floride was presented at the 1958 Paris Motor Show and was launched in the United States and Canada as the Renault Caravelle a year after its introduction in Europe. Outside of North America and Britain it was, until 1962, marketed under the nameplate Renault Floride.

== Name ==
Renault took notice of the growing success in North America of the Volkswagen Bug/Beetle and was looking for ways to match the Volkswagen's success with the Renault Dauphine. At a convention of North American distributors that took place in Florida, Renault's US dealers called for the creation of a Dauphine coupé/cabriolet which would improve Renault's image in the critical US market. Renault's chairman, Pierre Dreyfus, agreed, and since the concept had been born at a convention in Florida the car instantly became known within the company as the "Renault Floride". The "Floride" name was considered unsuitable for 49 of the 50 states of the U.S., however, since it could have implied disrespect to states other than Florida. For this reason an alternative name, "Caravelle", was from the start used for North America and for other major markets (including the UK) where the principal language was English.

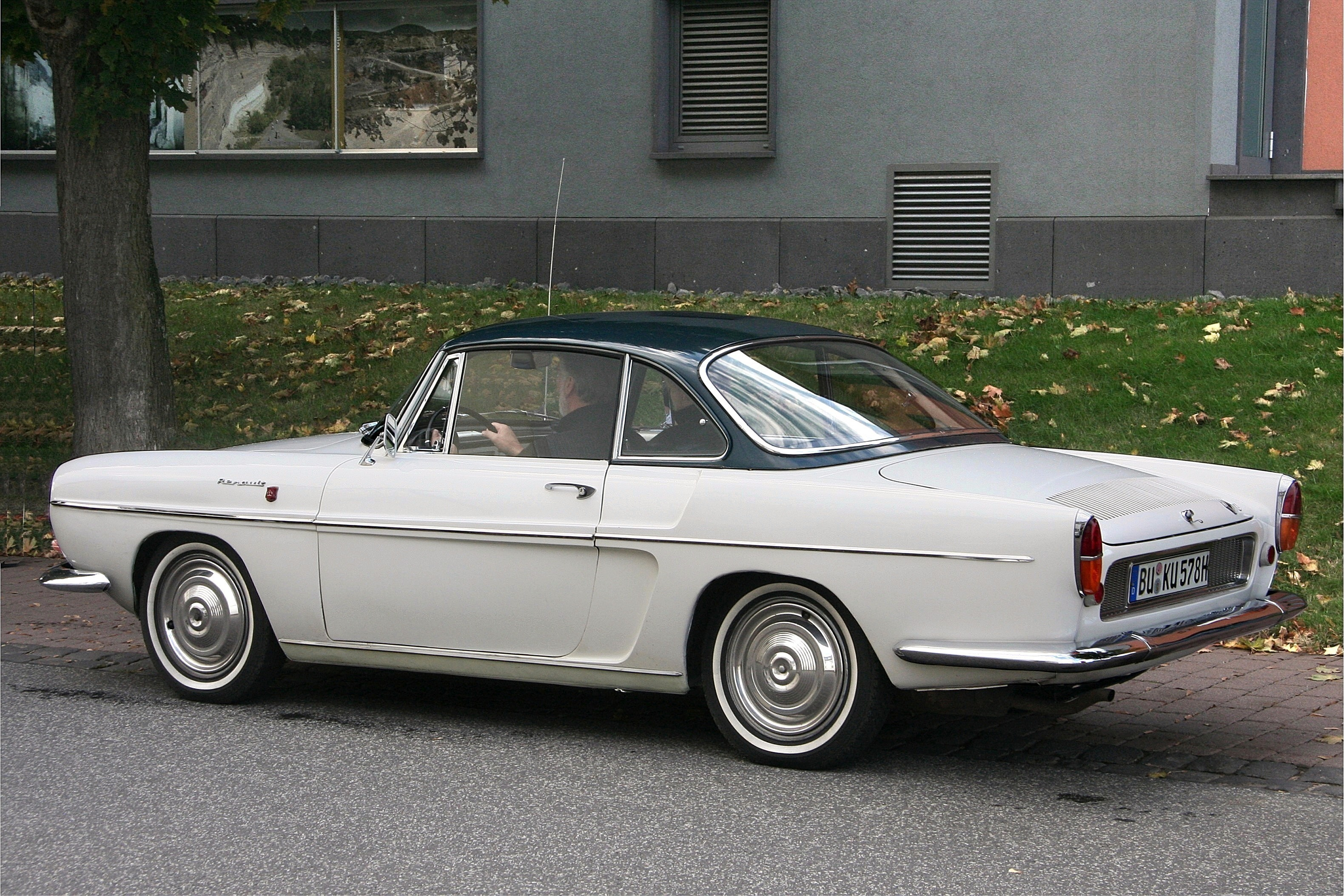
Renault Floride S convertible (with hardtop).

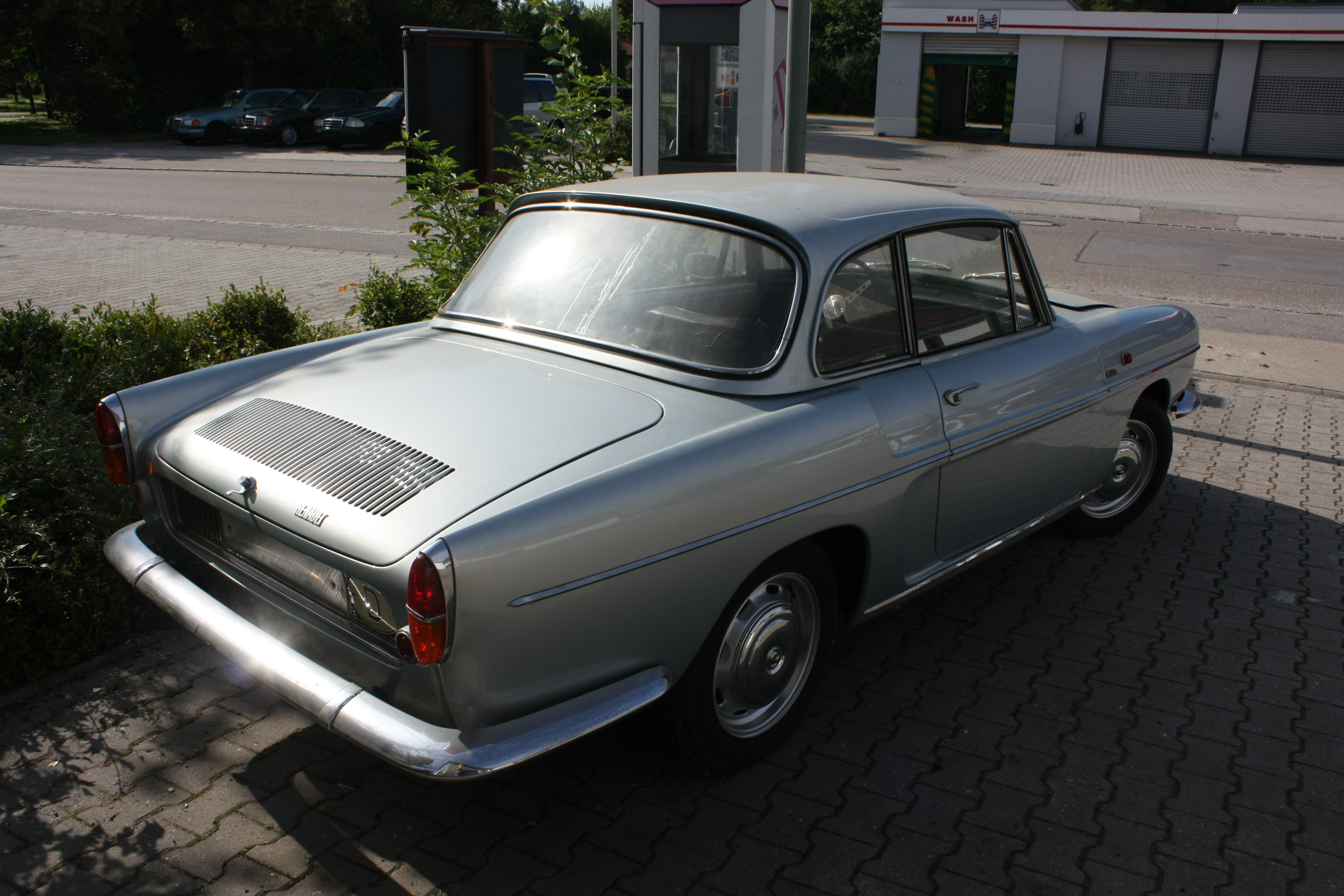
Renault Caravelle coupé. The sloping rear roof line was partially "squared off" in order to improve rear-seat headroom.

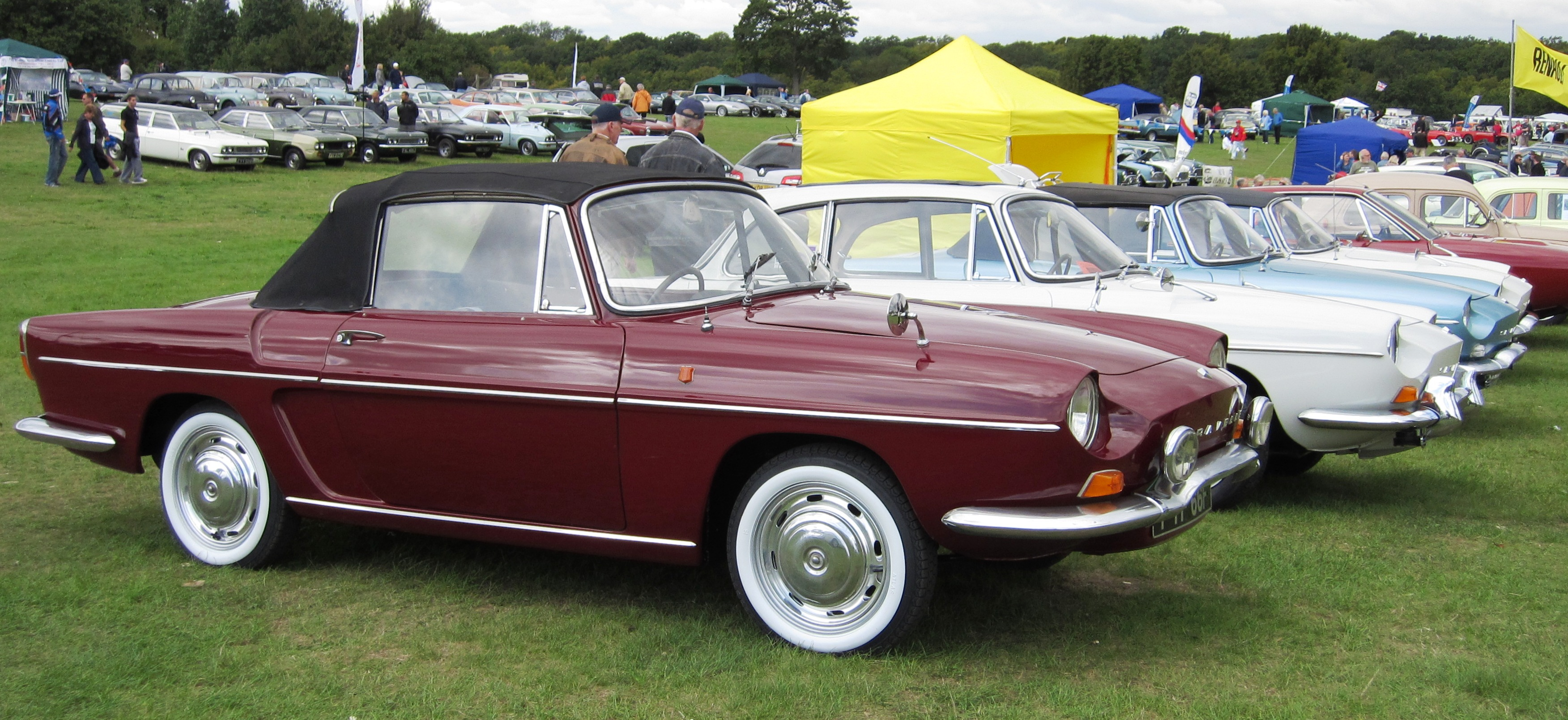
Renault Caravelle cabriolet.

The Floride name was revived for the 2011 Mégane Coupe Cabriolet Floride, a special edition convertible in ivory with red and ivory two tone interior, intended as a tribute to 1960s chic.

== Specifications ==
=== Bodies ===
The car was offered as a 2+2 coupé, a 2+2 cabriolet and as a convertible, the latter being a cabriolet with a removable hardtop. The 2,265 mm (89.2 in) wheelbase was shared with the Renault Dauphine but longer overhangs meant that overall the Floride was longer by a significant 320 mm (12.6 in), as well as being slightly lower and very slightly wider.

=== Engine ===
At launch the Floride, like the Dauphine on which it was based, came with an 845 cc (51.6 cu in) four-cylinder water-cooled engine mounted at the back of the car. However, the power unit on the Floride was fed using a Solex 32 mm carburetor as against the 28 mm diameter of the Solex carburetor on the Dauphine. The Florides making their French show debut on the stand at the 1958 Paris Motor Show came with a claimed power output of 37 hp (28 kW) SAE. By the time deliveries commenced, in early summer 1959, it was also possible for customers to specify a performance version, engineered by Amédée Gordini, which produced 40 hp (30 kW) SAE by means of various modifications to the inlet manifold and camshaft, and a compression ratio raised from 7.6:1 to 8.0:1.

=== Transmission ===
Power was delivered to the rear wheels via a three-speed manual transmission with synchromesh on the upper two ratios. For a supplement of 200 New Francs customers could instead specify a four-speed transmission on the slightly heavier coupé version of the car. Having regard to the car's power-to-weight ratio most customers chose to pay extra for the four speed gear box.

== Subcontracted production ==
Although designed by Frua of Italy, the car's body was constructed locally, by the automobile body maker Société des usines Chausson, based in Asnières-sur-Seine at the northern edge of Paris, and known in France as the producer of many of the school bus bodies used for transporting children in country areas.

Following the rapid economic growth experienced by France during the 1950s, and despite the fall-off in demand for the 4CV and the lacklustre market performance of the Frégate, thanks to the success of the recently launched Dauphine Renault still found themselves, in the second half of the decade, seriously short of production capacity. The main Billancourt plant, built on the Seguin island in the middle of the River Seine, was particularly ill-suited to further expansion. A new plant had been opened at Flins in 1952 and a second would follow near Le Havre in 1964, but neither of these addressed the challenge of finding somewhere to assemble the Floride in 1958.

The heavy engineering company of Brissonneau and Lotz, better known as a manufacturer of rolling stock for the railways, had launched a small cabriolet sports car in 1956. Based on the mechanical underpinnings of the Renault 4CV, the Brissonneau coupé had been a tentative project and only around 200 cars were sold. Renault now persuaded Brissonneau to abandon their own automobile project and adapt their facilities for assembly of the Floride. Brissonneau's long standing experience with railway locomotives provided abundant relevant experience at operational and workforce level, and Renault contributed much of the investment which during 1958 and 1959 saw the main Creil plant of Brissonneau, comprising 190,000 m2 of which 41,280 m2 were covered, transformed into a production facility for the Floride: the Floride would continue to be assembled by Brissonneau and Lotz until it was withdrawn in 1968.

== Upgrades ==
In October 1959, ready for the 1960 model year, the Floride, along with the Renault Dauphine, appeared with significant suspension improvements. The new suspension was conceived by the by now almost legendary automotive engineer Jean-Albert Grégoire and baptised by Renault "Suspension Aérostable", being intended to improve the car's ride and road holding. The addition of extra rubber springs at the front reduced roll and auxiliary air spring units (mounted inboard of the conventional coils) at the rear gave the rear wheels a small degree of negative camber and increased cornering grip.

In March 1962, the Caravelle received a new 956 cc engine that would be also used by the new Renault 8 from June. Although the new "Sierra" series five-bearing engine shared no components with the existing 845 cc Dauphine engine, it was conceptually very similar: the engine size was chosen in order to come in (slightly) below the top of the 5CV car tax band in France. It had a sealed cooling system as well as a new front suspension, new rear geometry, new steering, and a new gear linkage. Moving the radiator behind the engine also freed up an extra 12 cm of space behind the front seat. Maximum power output increased to 48 hp (36 kW). Four-speed transmission, already included in the price at no extra cost on some export markets, now came as part of the standard with the new engine even for French buyers, although bottom gear still made do without synchromesh. The upgraded cars, first presented at the 1962 Geneva Motor Show, now featured disc brakes on all four wheels: the Floride was the first French volume car to benefit from this enhancement which also reduced unsprung weight by approximately 6 kg. The Caravelle name also replaced the Floride name in all markets from 1962 onwards.

In 1964, another R8-derived engine of 1108 cc was introduced to the Caravelle, producing 55 hp (41 kW). This model was tested by the British "Autocar" magazine in November 1965. The car had a top speed of 89 mph (143 km/h) and accelerated from 0-60 mph (97 km/h) in 17.8 seconds. An "overall" fuel consumption of 30.2 miles per imperial gallon (9.4 L/100 km; 25.1 mpg_{‑US}) was recorded. The Caravelle's performance closely matched that of the contemporary Triumph Spitfire 4 under most headings, though the Spitfire was a couple of mph ahead on top speed. The British car market was still protected by tariffs at this time, but even allowing for that the Renault looks expensive in this company: The Caravelle came with a UK recommended price of £1039 as against £666 for the Spitfire 4.

== Commercial ==
Production got under way slowly, with only 3,777 cars completed in 1959. However, in 1960, following the important "Aérostable" suspension upgrades, Renault produced 36,156 Florides.

By the mid-1960s, the Caravelle, which had been fashionably styled at launch, was looking dated, while the reduction and elimination of internal tariffs within the Common Market led to intensified competition in France for buyers of inexpensive sports cars, notably from Italy. Between 1966 and 1967, annual production tumbled from 4,880 to 2,991. During 1968, only 1,438 were produced, and it was during the summer of that year that Renault withdrew the Caravelle.
