= VDL Nedcar =

Automotive manufacturing company

VDL Nedcar B.V.

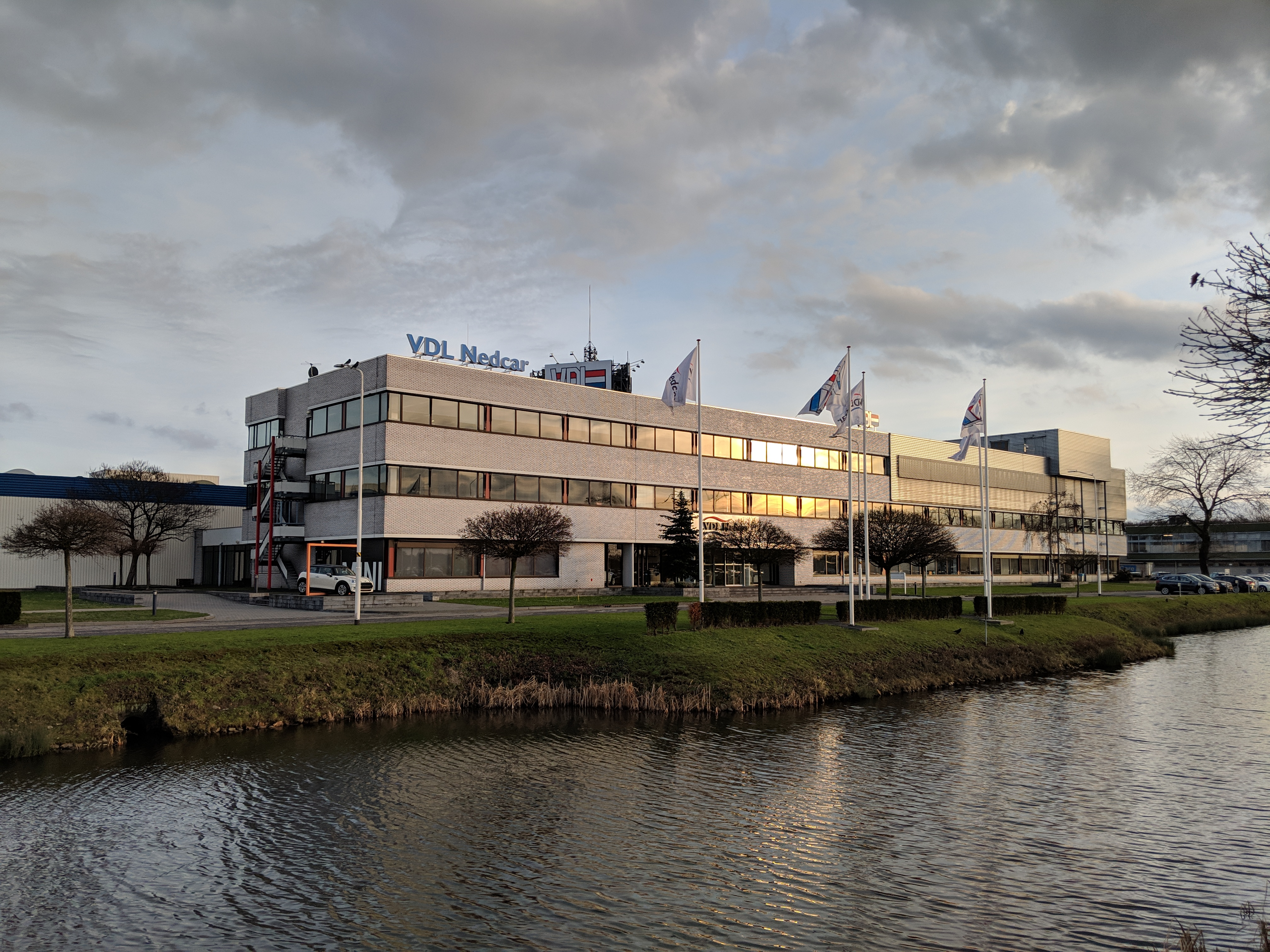
- VDL Nedcar Factory at Born, Netherlands
- Type: Besloten vennootschap
- Industry: Automotive
- Predecessor: DAF Car B.V. (1968–1975); Volvo Car B.V. (1975–1992); NedCar B.V. (1992–2012)
- Founded: 1967
- Headquarters: Born, Netherlands
- Area served: Worldwide
- Key people: Willem van der Leegte (Chairman VDL Groep B.V.) Paul van Vroonhoven (Managing director) John van Soerland (CEO VDL Nedcar B.V.)
- Products: Automobiles List: Mini Hatch (2014–2024); Mini Convertible (2015–2024); Mini Countryman (2016–2023); BMW X1 (F48) (2017–2022)
- Production output: ▼125,666 vehicles (2020)
- Revenue: ▼€2,3 billion (2017)
- Owner: VDL Groep B.V.
- Number of employees: ▼4,951 (2019)
- Website: www.vdlnedcar.nl

VDL Nedcar was an automotive manufacturing company in Born, Netherlands. It was the largest automotive factory in the country, with a production capacity of 240,000 vehicles a year. VDL Nedcar was closed in March 2024 because the contract with BMW Group was not renewed.

The company had its origins in a DAF car factory which opened in 1968. It was then owned by Volvo Cars and produced Volvo cars, then in the 1990s also produced Mitsubishi cars after a joint venture with Mitsubishi Motors and the Dutch state. Volvo production ended in 2004 and Mitsubishi in 2012. Dutch industrial conglomerate VDL Groep then owned the factory and produced Mini cars and the BMW X1 (F48) for the BMW Group until the factory's closure in 2024.

== Location ==
VDL Nedcar in Born is located in Limburg, a province in the south of the Netherlands. VDL Nedcar has direct access to the ports of Rotterdam, Zeebrugge, Antwerp and Hamburg. Nearby is an inland barge terminal and a rail terminal, supported by airports such as Maastricht/Aachen, Amsterdam, Eindhoven, Brussels, Cologne and Düsseldorf.

Area development and expansion of VDL Nedcar

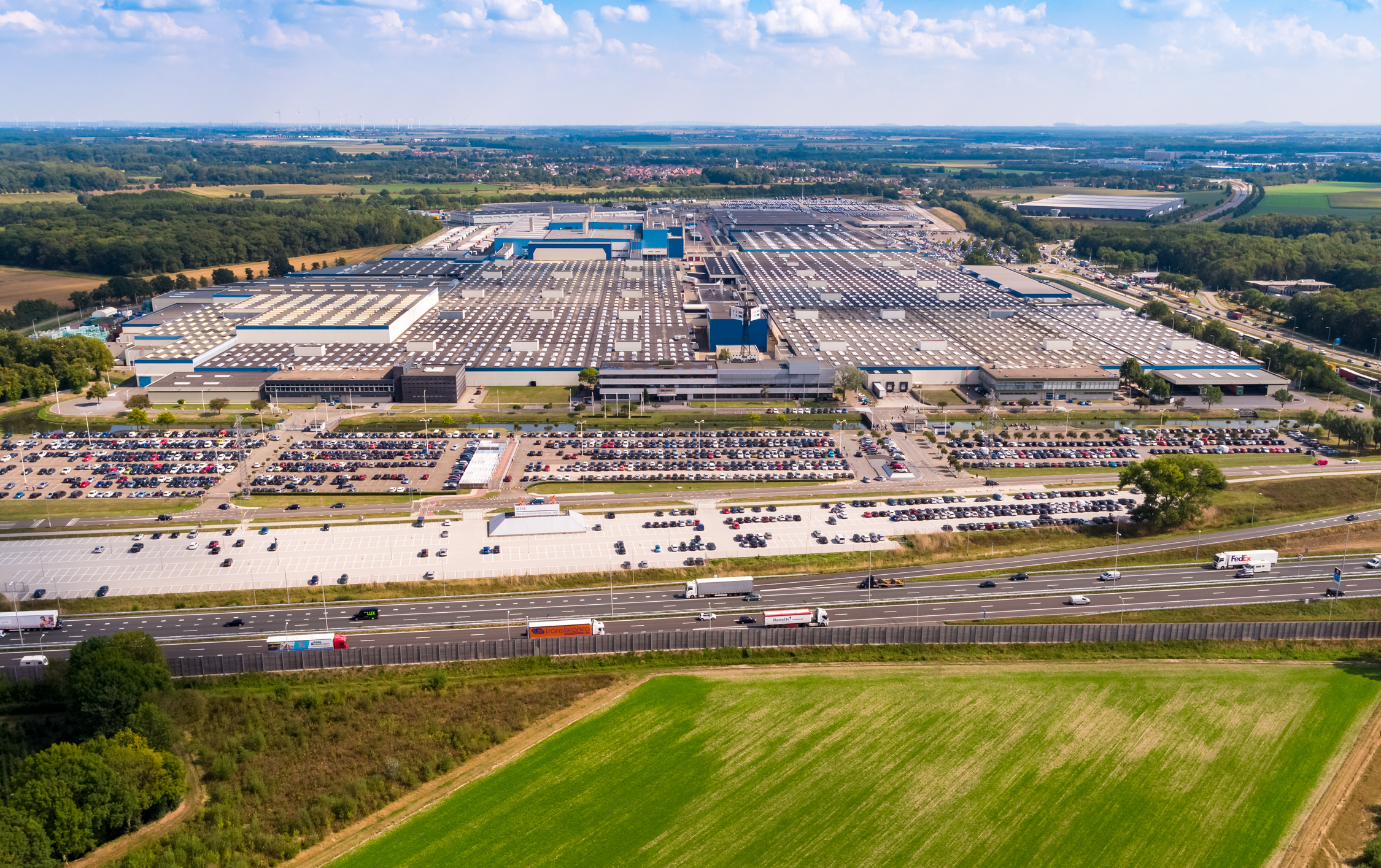
VDL Nedcar Factory in Born, the Netherlands

In 2019, VDL Nedcar and the province of Limburg signed an agreement on the sale of land around the factory, increasing the total site to about 1,500,000 square meters. Permits are expected to be granted in late 2021 for another expansion of 59 hectares, allowing up to 400,000 vehicles a year to be produced.

== History ==
The factory was founded in 1967 by the former Van Doorne's Automobiel Fabriek (DAF), and continued after the takeover of its parent by Volvo in 1972–1975. When financial difficulties threatened to close it down in the early 1990s the Dutch government stepped in to ensure its survival.

A joint venture between the Dutch State, Volvo and Mitsubishi Motors began in August 1991, although it was 1996 before the name was officially changed from Volvo Car B.V. to Netherlands Car B.V. On 15 February 1999 the Dutch government sold its shares to its two partners, which then owned 50 percent each. Later, on 30 March 2001, Volvo sold its shares to Mitsubishi, which then owned 100 percent. The plant's long-term survival was in question from 2001, when then Mitsubishi Motors Chief Operating Officer Rolf Eckrodt stated that its annual vehicle production capacity had to increase to 280,000 if it wished to remain economically viable. The last Volvo automobiles were built in 2004.

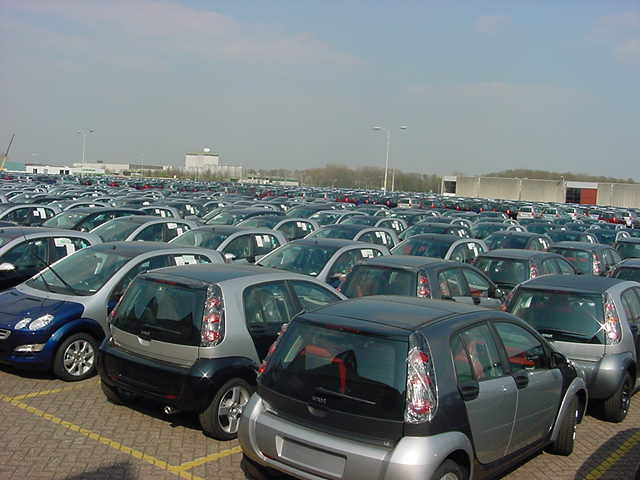
NedCar produced the Smart Forfour from 2004 to 2006

Between 2004 and 2012 the Mitsubishi Colt was built at Nedcar. The factory also produced the Colt's sister vehicle, the Smart Forfour, for DaimlerChrysler until production ceased in mid-2006. Industrial action was taken in 2005 in protest against the discontinuation of the Smart Forfour, although Mitsubishi confirmed its commitment to keeping the factory open as far as the end of the Colt's life cycle in 2009. Since then, European market versions of the Mitsubishi Outlander have had their production transferred from Japan to the Netherlands from 2008, while the Outlander-based Citroën C-Crosser and Peugeot 4007 were also planned to be assembled at Born for the European market, but this was postponed indefinitely because of slow sales of these models. Labour union FNV, NedCar COO Joost Goovaarts and the works council have said it is a step towards securing the future of the plant. In 2012, Mitsubishi announced it would stop producing cars in the Netherlands.

Dutch industrial group VDL acquired the factory in December 2012 and renamed it VDL Nedcar. VDL entered negotiations with BMW which resulted in the announcement that certain Mini models would be produced in the Limburg factory from 2014 onwards. Since 2017, the BMW X1 (F48) has been produced at VDL Nedcar, which shares production with the BMW Group plant at Regensburg. In October 2020, VDL Nedcar announced that it would not receive a follow-up order for the Mini Countryman from BMW Group for the longer term, leaving it to search for another manufacturer to fill production capacity.

In June 2021, U.S. EV startup Canoo announced it would use VDL for its first run of the Lifestyle Vehicle starting in 2022, an interim measure as it builds its Oklahoma factory. Member of parliament Silvio Erkens of the People's Party for Freedom and Democracy (VVD) suggested in 2024 that the site could be used to produce defense materiel, when the Netherlands expanded its defense budget following the Russian invasion of Ukraine. The Ministry of Defence later disclosed it was talking with VDL.

== Production ==
After the cessation of Mitsubishi manufacturing in 2012, production restarted in 2014 with the new Mini Hatch model.

=== Final production ===
On February 16, 2024, the last car, a silver-grey Mini convertible, ran off the production line, two weeks prior to the end of BMW's contract. It is uncertain if car production will ever commence again.

=== Reopening as military drone factory ===
On July 2, 2025, the Dutch Ministry of Defense signed off on a reopening as a military drone-factory

=== Past models and production years ===
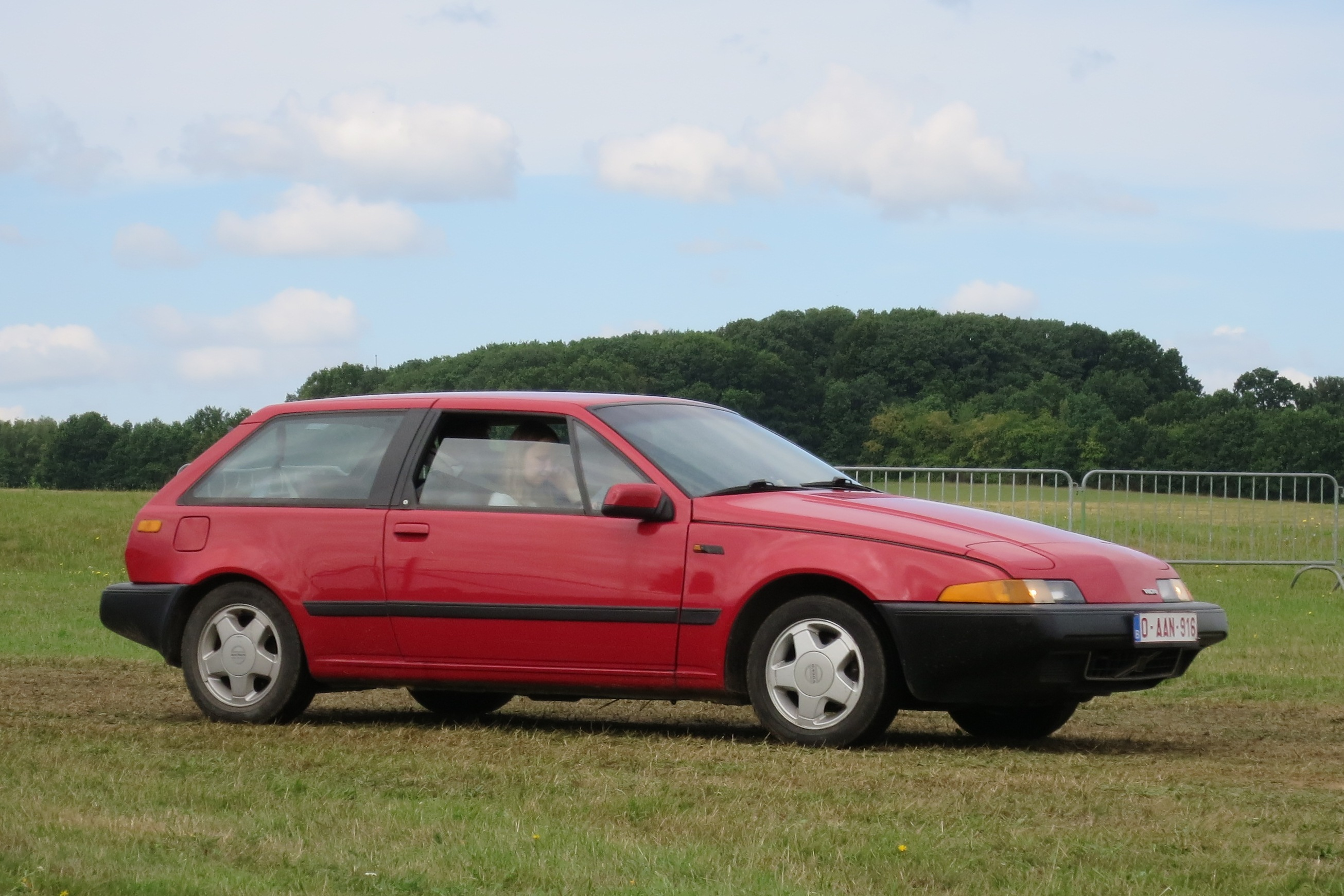
Volvo 480

- DAF 33 (1967–1972)
- DAF 44 (1967–1975)
- DAF 55 (1968–1972)
- DAF 66 (1972–1975)
- DAF 46 (1975–1976)
- Volvo 66 (1975–1981)
- Volvo 340/360 (1976–1991)
- Volvo 480 (1986–1995)
- Volvo 440/460 (1987–1997)
- Volvo S40/V40 (1995–2004)
- Mitsubishi Carisma (1995–2004)
- Mitsubishi Space Star (1998–2005)
- Smart Forfour (2004–2006)
- Mitsubishi Colt (2004–2012)
- Mitsubishi Outlander (2008–2012)
- Mini Hatch 3-door (2014–2024)
- Mini Convertible (2015–2024), the only plant that assembled the Mini Convertible
- BMW X1 (F48) (2017–2022)
- Mini Countryman (2017–2023)

=== Annual output ===
Year	Units	Models
1992	94,019	Volvo 440/460, Volvo 480
1993	80,246	Volvo 440/460, Volvo 480
1994	92,044	Volvo 440/460, Volvo 480
1995	98,454	Volvo 440/460, Volvo 480, Volvo S40/V40, Mitsubishi Carisma
1996	145,090	Volvo 440/460, Volvo S40/V40, Mitsubishi Carisma
1997	197,225	Volvo S40/V40, Mitsubishi Carisma
1998	242,804	Volvo S40/V40, Mitsubishi Carisma, Mitsubishi Space Star
1999	262,196	Volvo S40/V40, Mitsubishi Carisma, Mitsubishi Space Star
2000	214,974	Volvo S40/V40, Mitsubishi Carisma, Mitsubishi Space Star
2001	189,188	Volvo S40/V40, Mitsubishi Carisma, Mitsubishi Space Star
2002	182,368	Volvo S40/V40, Mitsubishi Carisma, Mitsubishi Space Star
2003	163,130	Volvo S40/V40, Mitsubishi Carisma, Mitsubishi Space Star
2004	187,600	Volvo S40/V40, Mitsubishi Carisma, Mitsubishi Colt, Mitsubishi Space Star, Smart Forfour
2005	115,079	Mitsubishi Colt, Mitsubishi Space Star, Smart Forfour
2006	87,332	Mitsubishi Colt, Smart Forfour
2007	61,912	Mitsubishi Colt
2008	59,223	Mitsubishi Colt, Mitsubishi Outlander
2009	50,620	Mitsubishi Colt, Mitsubishi Outlander
2010	48,025	Mitsubishi Colt, Mitsubishi Outlander
2011	40,772	Mitsubishi Colt, Mitsubishi Outlander
2012	24,895	Mitsubishi Colt, Mitsubishi Outlander
2013	0	
2014	29,196	MINI Hatch 3-door (assembly contract BMW)
2015	57,019	MINI Hatch 3-door and Convertible (assembly contract BMW)
2016	87,609	MINI Hatch 3-door, MINI Convertible and MINI Countryman (assembly contract BMW)
2017	168,969	BMW X1, MINI Hatch 3-door, Convertible, Countryman, and Countryman Hybrid (assembly contract BMW)
2018	211,660	BMW X1, MINI Convertible, Countryman (assembly contract BMW)
2019	174,097	BMW X1, MINI Convertible, Countryman (assembly contract BMW)
2020	125,666	BMW X1, MINI Convertible, Countryman (assembly contract BMW)
2021	105,214	BMW X1, MINI Convertible, Countryman (assembly contract BMW)
2022	99,126	BMW X1 (ended June 2022) MINI Convertible, Countryman (assembly contract BMW)

In 2011, the Nedcar factory produced 4.3% of the global output of Mitsubishi. However, vehicle assembly for Mitsubishi came to an end during 2012.

== NedCar Access ==
NedCar displayed the Access concept car at the 1996 Geneva Motor Show to demonstrate the company's product design and engineering capabilities. It was a 5-door hatchback, 4.25 m (13.9 ft) long and fitted with a four-cylinder petrol engine. It was constructed with a mix of aluminium and plastics.
