= DAF 55 =

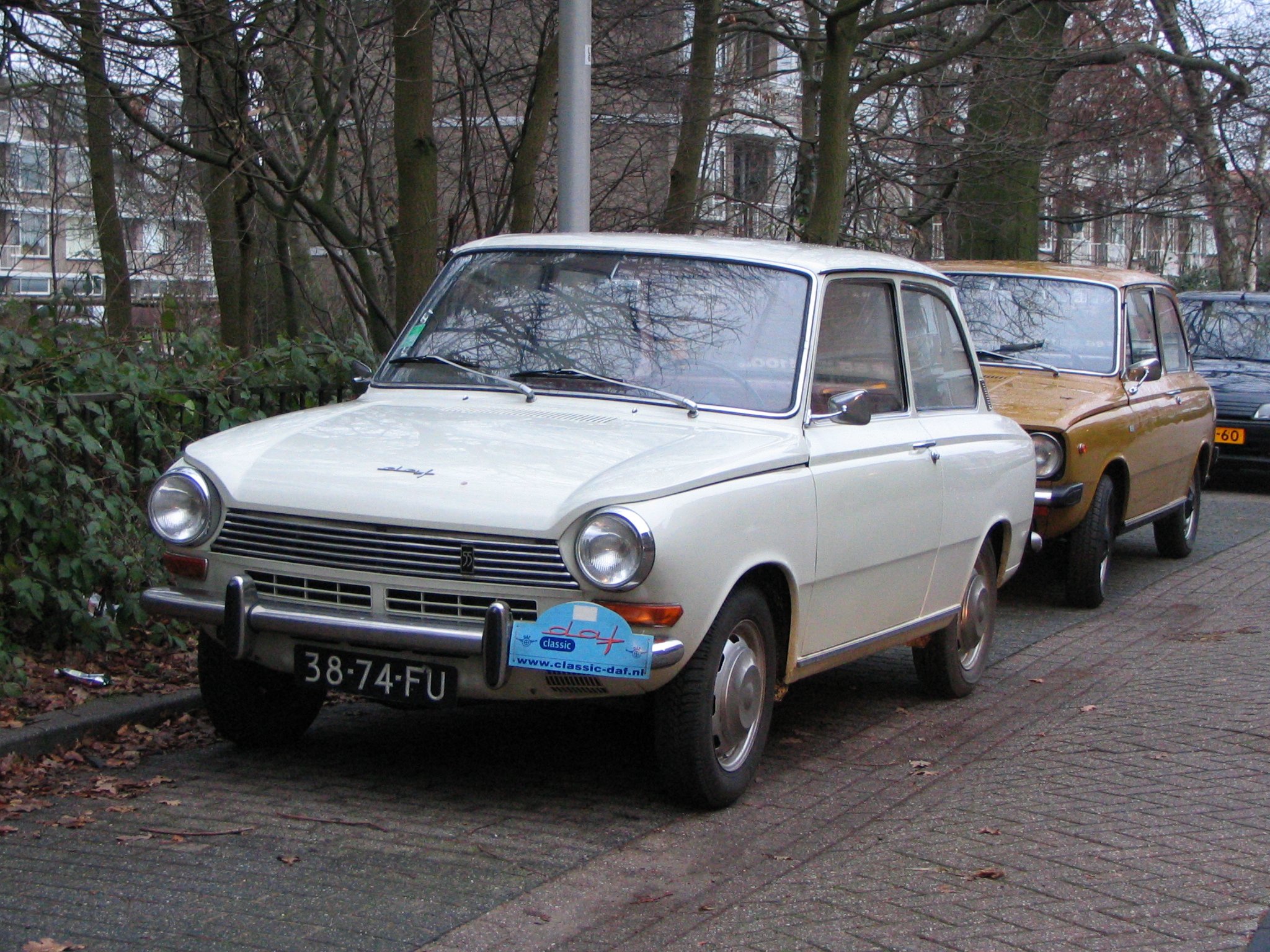

Overview
- Manufacturer: DAF
- Production: 1967–1972; 164,231 produced
- Assembly: Netherlands: Born (DAF Born)
- Designer: Giovanni Michelotti

Body and chassis
- Class: Small family car (C)
- Body style: 2-door Saloon; 3-door Station wagon 2-door Coupé
- Layout: FR layout

Powertrain
- Engine: 1.1 L (1108 cc) B110 I4
- Transmission: Variomatic

Dimensions
- Wheelbase: 2,250 mm (88.6 in)
- Length: 3,880 mm (152.8 in)
- Width: 1,540 mm (60.6 in)
- Height: 1,445 mm (56.9 in)
- Curb weight: 765 kg (1,687 lb)

Chronology
- Successor: DAF 66

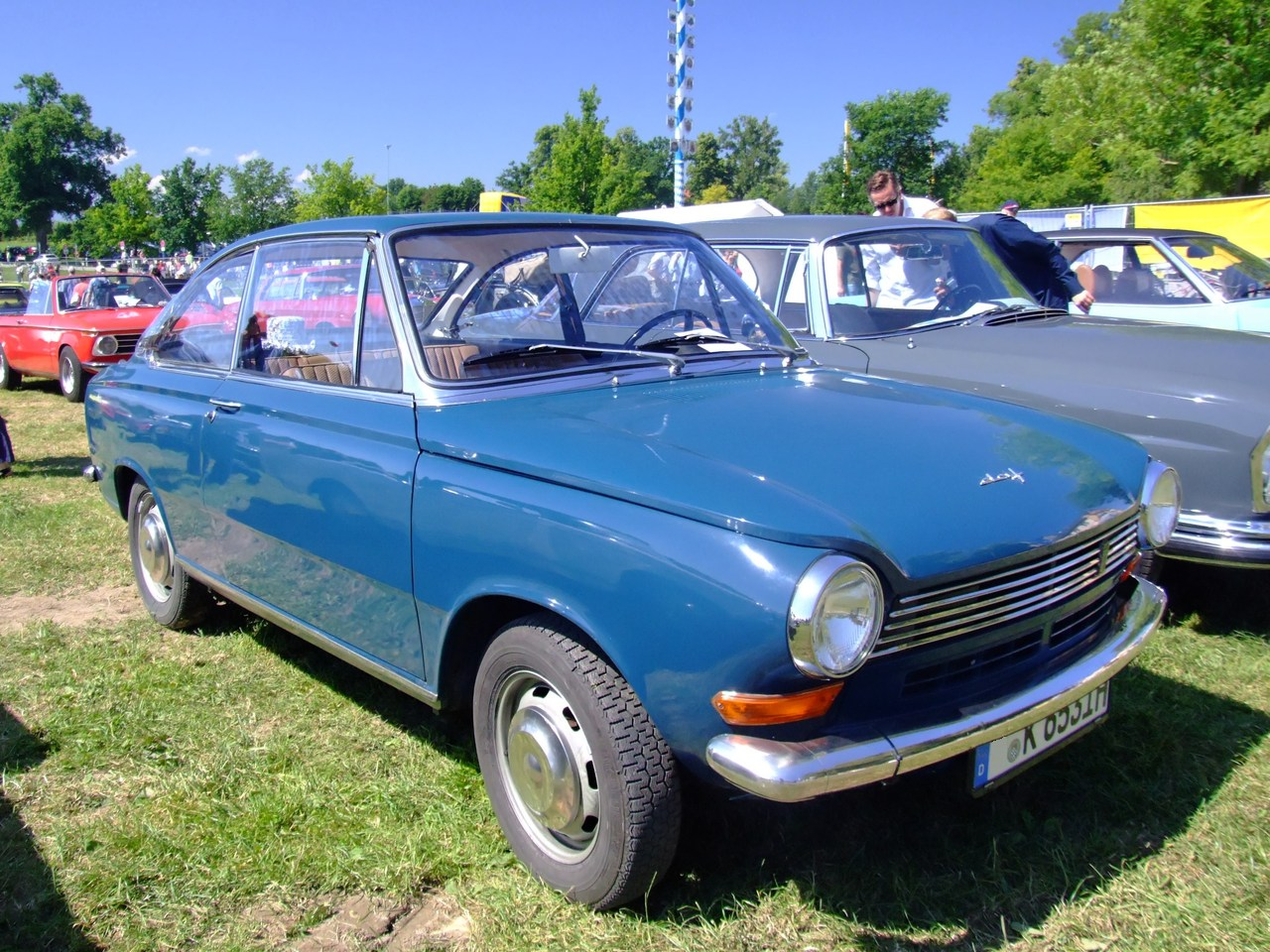
DAF 55 Coupe

The DAF 55 is a small family car produced by the Dutch company DAF from December 1967 to September 1972. At that time it was replaced with the DAF 66.

All 55s featured the unique Variomatic belt-driven continuously variable transmission, with no manual transmission available. This feature of all DAF cars was very unusual for its class at the time.

The 55 was available as a 2-door saloon, a 3-door estate, and a 2-door coupé.

In total 164,231 DAF 55s were built.

== Origins ==
The 55 was developed to be a more powerful version of the 1966 DAF 44. The redesign was extensive, and featured the following major changes:

- Powertrain
  - Because the 44's two-cylinder DAF-designed boxer engine was at the end of its development, DAF partnered with Renault to build a 50 bhp (37 kW) version of their 1108 cc water-cooled inline-four Cléon engine, dubbed the B110.
- Suspension
  - The front suspension was changed from the 44's transverse leaf spring setup to longitudinally mounted torsion bars. At the rear, the 44's swing axle layout incorporating the Variomatic transmission was retained.
- Braking
  - For added safety a dual circuit brake system was fitted. All models also featured front disc brakes as opposed to the 44's drum brakes.
- Bodywork
  - The front panel was changed to provide room and airflow to the radiator.

The rest of the car featured detail trim changes to set it apart from the lesser 44. All this heightened performance to a 136 km/h top speed, and made for a more practical car.

== Model chronology ==
The saloon was launched at the end of 1967, with the coupe version launched three months later, in March 1968. The coupe was overall more elegant than the saloon, featuring a lower and gently sloping roof line, pillarless doors and a more upscale interior featuring reclining seats, carpet instead of the saloon's rubber mats and fake wood on the dashboard. Although the roof line turned it from a 4-seater into a 2+2, the coupe was a very successful model; 1 in 8 DAF 55s sold was a coupe.

In September 1968 the estate version became available. In August 1969 there was a minor facelift of the whole model range and a delivery version became available, essentially a 55 estate without a rear seat. After the DAF 55 having been successful in the 1968 London-Sydney Marathon, the dealer option 'Marathon' package was introduced. The multi-tier package meant that the dealer could fit an optical package with alloy wheels and interior parts, an uprated suspension, parts to upgrade the B110 engine to 65 bhp (48 kW), or all of the above.

In 1971 the factory version of this package was introduced, simply called the 55 Marathon. This did not feature an upgraded suspension, and had a 63 bhp (47 kW) 1108 cc engine, the BR110. This raised the top speed to 145 km/h. The 55 Marathon featured wider steel wheels, exterior striping and a brake booster was added for safety and comfort. The Marathon was available as a saloon or a coupe.

In 1971 the coupe received normal doors with pillars, since the earlier pillarless design proved to be leaky and noisy at speed.

== Motorsport ==
The DAF factory was very involved in motorsport, to show the world that the Variomatic transmission was reliable as well as sporty. The 55 relieved the 44 in the works rally program, and had various successes. A 55 won the 1968 Alpine Rally, and in late 1968 Rob Slotemaker finished 17th out of 100 contestants in the 16500 km London-Sydney Marathon. This success inspired the later 'Marathon' range offered by DAF. Because of the Variomatic and its function as a limited-slip differential it was also popular with many privateers in the rally world. Jan de Rooy, of Paris Dakar fame, built his own 4-wheel drive version, with a mid-mounted Ford BDA engine coupled to a special Variomatic and campaigned it with great success on the international rallycross theatre throughout the early 1970s..

Owing to the quirk of the Variomatic transmission's ability to drive the car at maximum speed in reverse gear, the 55 (and its successors) became a staple of reverse gear racing, popularised in the Netherlands where the cars were manufactured.
