= DAF 44 =

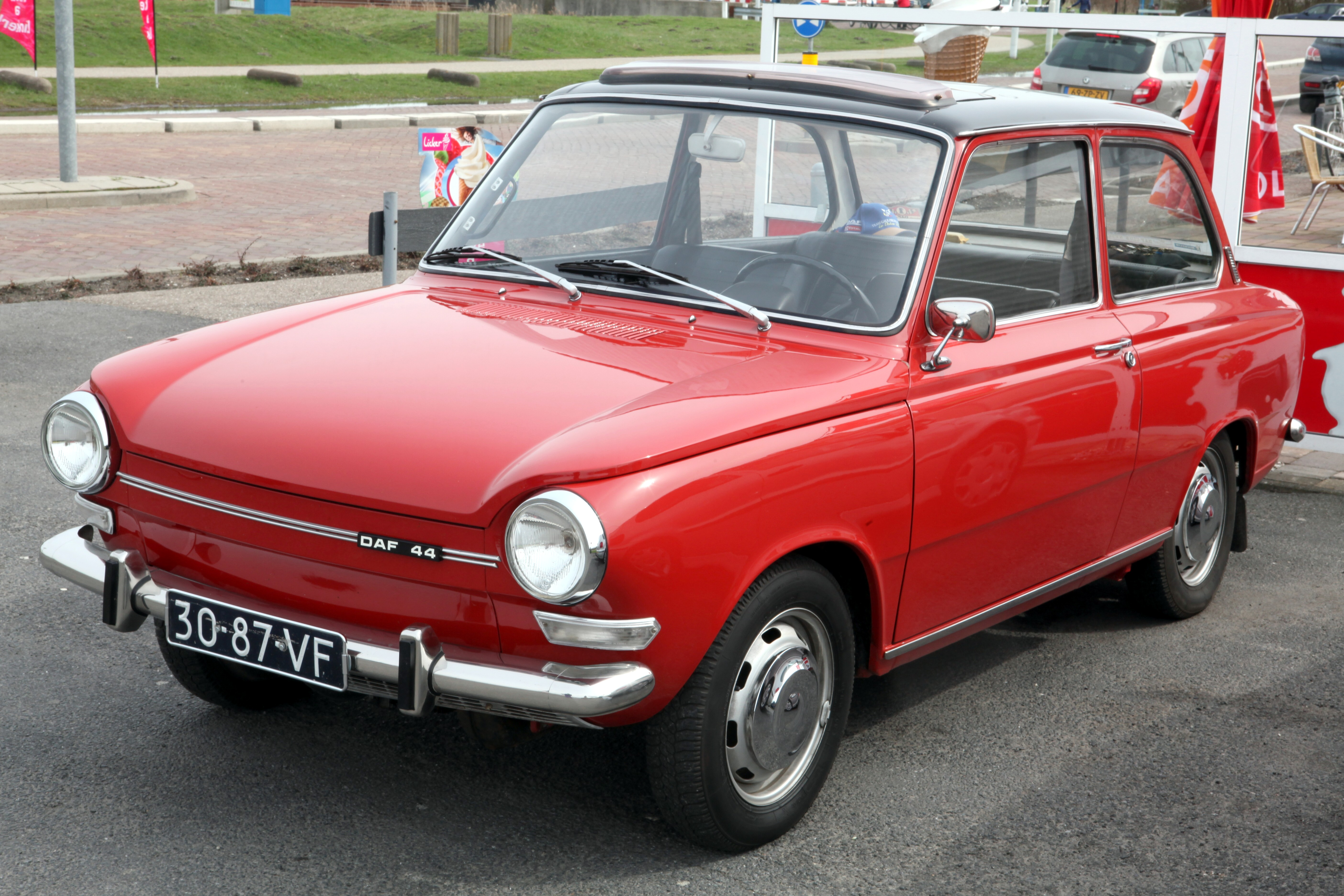
- DAF 44 Saloon

Overview
- Manufacturer: DAF
- Production: September 1966 – November 1974; 167,902 produced
- Assembly: Netherlands: Born (DAF Born)
- Designer: Giovanni Michelotti

Body and chassis
- Class: Small family car
- Body style: 2-door Saloon; 2-door Estate
- Layout: FR layout
- Related: Kalmar Tjorven

Powertrain
- Engine: 844 cc flat twin
- Transmission: Variomatic

Dimensions
- Wheelbase: 2,248 mm (88.5 in)
- Length: 3,848 mm (151.5 in)
- Width: 1,537 mm (60.5 in)
- Height: 1,391 mm (54.8 in)
- Curb weight: 724 kg (1,596 lb)

Chronology
- Predecessor: DAF 33
- Successor: DAF 46

The DAF 44 is a small family car that was introduced in September 1966 by the Dutch company DAF. It was the first car to be built at the company's new plant at Born in Limburg. Styled by Michelotti, it represented a cautious move upmarket for the company which hitherto had produced, for the passenger car market, only the smaller, slower Daffodil model (subsequently rebadged as the DAF 33 to align with the form of nomenclature introduced with the 44).

The 2 cylinder engine would have been familiar to any driver of the less powerful DAF 33, and the bore remained unchanged at 85.5 mm. Stroke was increased to 73.5 mm, however, giving an increase in engine displacement from 746 cc to 844 cc and an increase in claimed output from 28 bhp to 34 bhp. The compression ratio remained low enough to permit the use of relatively low octane fuel.

Stopping power commensurate with the car's rather leisurely performance came from all-round drum brakes.

An innovative feature for the time was face-level ventilation with adjustable fascia mounted outlets.

The spare wheel was stored under the front hood / bonnet which left more space for luggage at the back and makes the point that the engine was a relatively compact one.

The DAF 44 also provided the underpinnings for the tall-built Swedish specialty vehicle Kalmar KVD 440 ("Tjorven").

The DAF 44, in common with other DAF cars, featured an innovative continuously variable transmission system, the DAF Variomatic. Just like on DAF's smaller 600, 750 and 33, the Variomatic built under the rear seat also served as the differential, thus effectively constituting a transaxle.

In addition to the 2-door saloon, a 2-door estate/hatchback or panel van version were also available. Production ended in November 1974 after 167,902 had been built. While the 44 was replaced by the short-lived DAF 46, leftover cars continued to be available for some time.

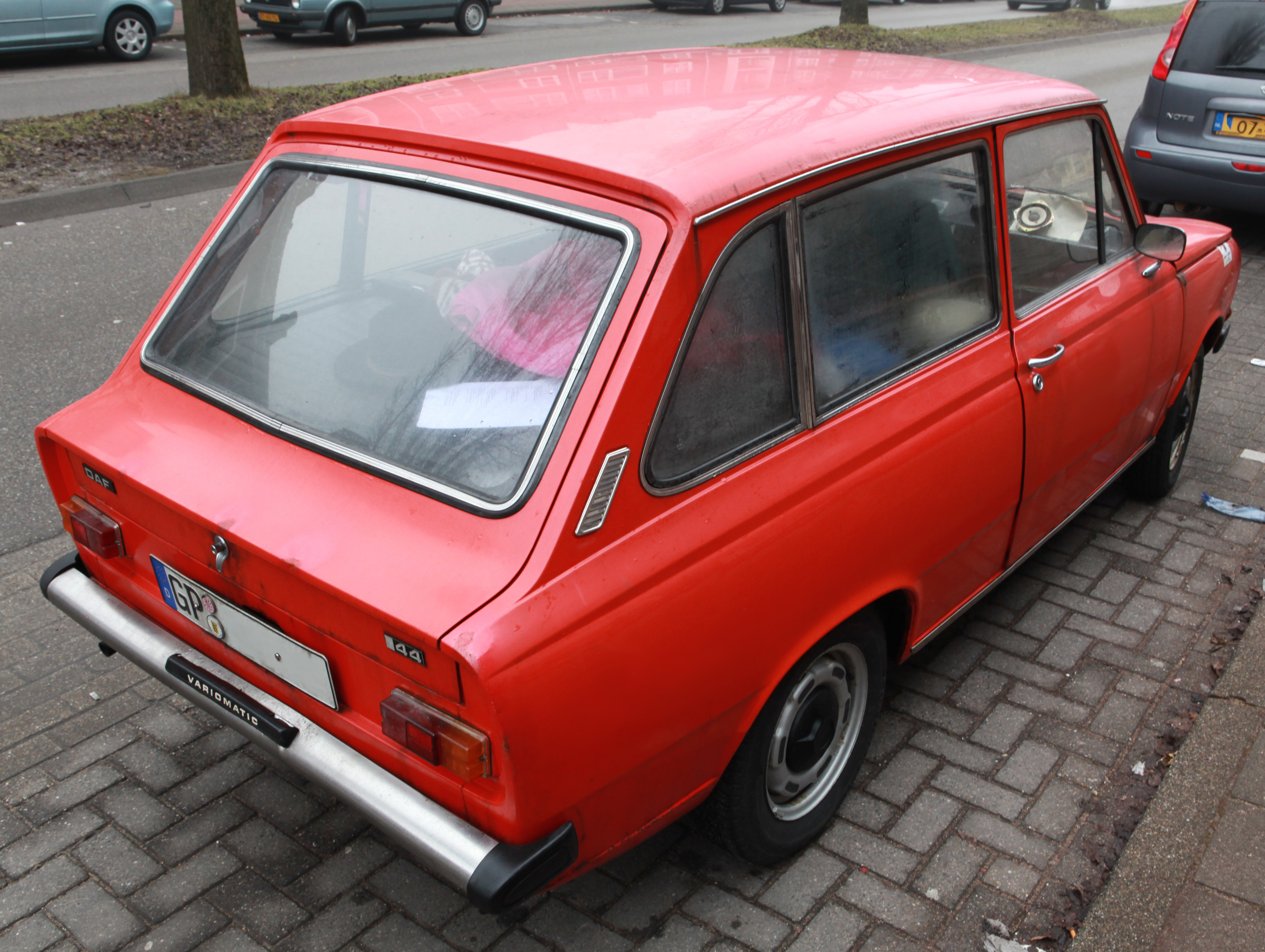
DAF 44 Combi (1974)
