= DAF 66 =

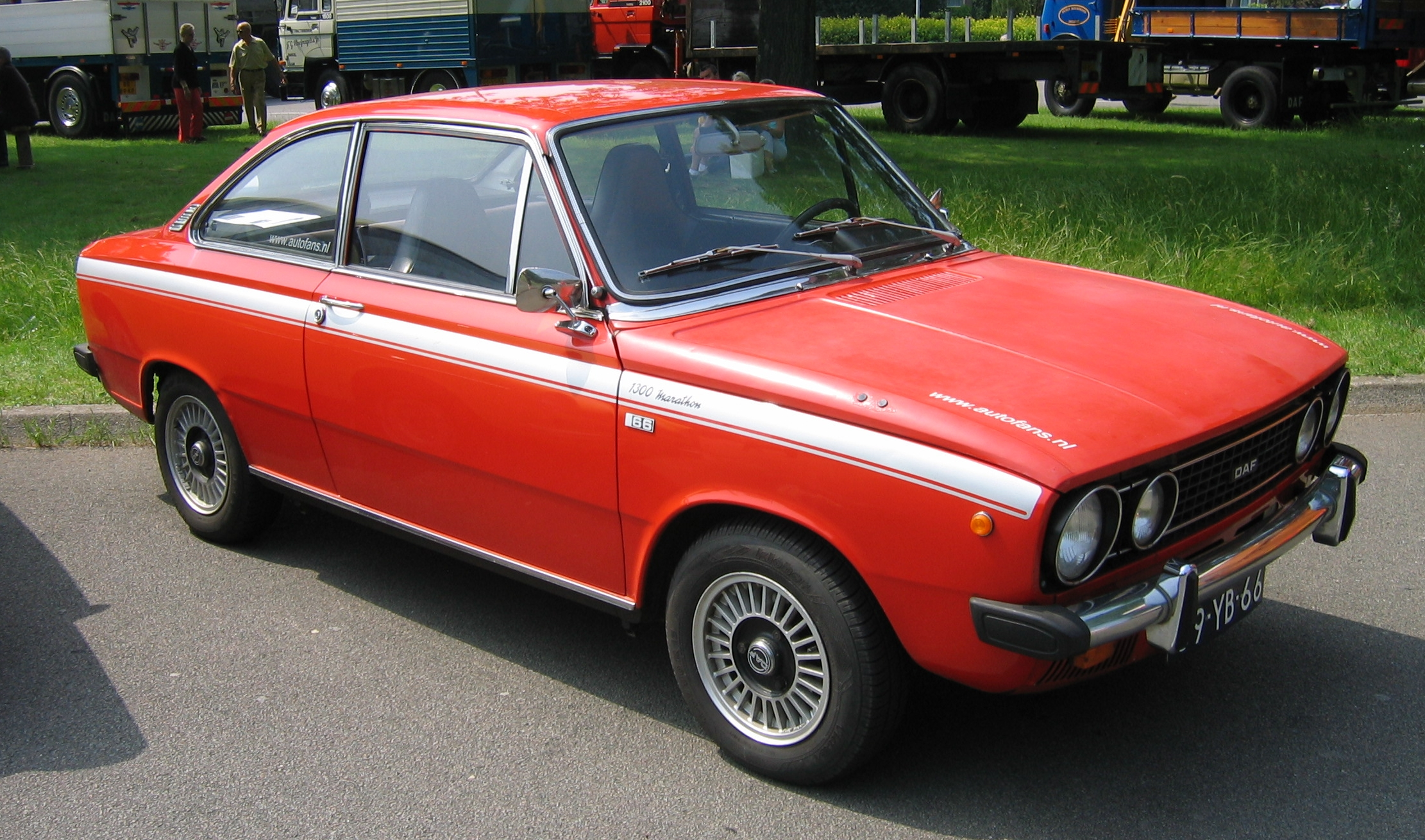
- DAF 66 Marathon Coupe

Overview
- Manufacturer: DAF
- Production: 1972–1975; 146,297 produced
- Assembly: Netherlands: Born (DAF Born)
- Designer: Giovanni Michelotti

Body and chassis
- Class: Small family car (C)
- Body style: 2-door sedan 3-door estate 2-door coupé
- Layout: FR layout

Powertrain
- Engine: 1108 cc B110 OHV I4; 1289 cc B130 OHV I4
- Transmission: Variomatic

Dimensions
- Wheelbase: 2,250 mm (88.6 in)
- Length: 3,835 mm (151.0 in)
- Width: 1,525 mm (60.0 in)
- Height: 1,448 mm (57.0 in)
- Kerb weight: 780 kg (1,720 lb)

Chronology
- Predecessor: DAF 55
- Successor: Volvo 66

The DAF 66 is a small family car produced by the Dutch company DAF from September 1972 to 1976. It was the successor of the DAF 55 and was itself superseded by the reworked Volvo 66. The DAF 66 was the last four-cylinder car to feature the DAF name.

The 66 was available as a 2-door saloon, a 2-door coupé, and a 3-door estate. It featured the unique Variomatic belt-driven continuously variable transmission. In total 146,297 DAF 66s were built.

== Origins ==
The 66 was an evolution of the 1967 DAF 55. Aside from a cosmetic update, the redesign featured several changes, especially a major redesign of the rear axle, suspension, and drive:

- Powertrain
  - The 1108 cc Renault engines were reworked to have lower emissions, changing power to 53 PS (39 kW) for the normal models, and 60 PS (44 kW) for the 1100 Marathon.
- Suspension
  - The rear suspension and Variomatic was completely redesigned, learning from DAF's experience in Formula Three racing. The Variomatic was much more robust and now incorporated a differential for smoother low speed maneuvering. The unpredictable swing axle rear suspension of the 44 and 55 was changed to a leaf sprung De Dion tube axle, which greatly improved handling and comfort.
- Braking
  - Cheaper models now featured drum brakes all around, whilst higher spec models retained the 55's front disk brake setup.
- Bodywork
  - The complete front clip was restyled with a full-width grille, giving a boxier appearance. The rear featured narrower rear lights.

== Model chronology ==
The 66 was launched as a wide model range, incorporating a 2-door saloon, a 3-door estate and a 2-door 2+2 coupe. At introduction the customer could choose from 'De Luxe' (official type designation 6622 for sedans, 6632 for combis, featuring drum brakes and vinyl seats), 'Super Luxe' (Front disks and reclining cloth seats, type 6623 for sedans, 6624 for coupes, 6633 for combis) and 'Marathon' (Extra power and wider wheels, type 6625 for sedans, 6626 for coupes, 6627 for combis) trim levels.

In 1973 the '1300 Marathon' replaced the original, 1.1-litre Marathon (type 6645 for sedans, 6646 for coupes, 6647 for combis). It featured a 1289 cc, 57 PS (42 kW) version of the Renault C-series inline-four engine which was used in all 66s. The 1300 Marathon was distinguishable from its lesser brethren by the foglights mounted in the grille. The interior featured a centre console with room for fitting extra gauges and high backed cloth sports seats. The less torquey but more powerful 1108 cc Marathon engine remained available as an option on all models.

In 1974 the Dutch Armed Forces commissioned DAF to build a small personnel carrier. This car, the YA 66 was an adaptation of the normal 1108 cc 66 sedan, with the most apparent change being a roofless, Jeep like body. Technically it was very similar, and as such had little to no terrain capacity. 1,201 DAF YA 66s were built. They were all decommissioned in the early 1990s and sold to the public.

== DAFs in the media ==
A white saloon version of the DAF 66 features in the opening credit sequence of series 2 of the British made ITV detective series Van der Valk which was filmed on location in Amsterdam. Van der Valk is seen as a passenger in this sequence and the car is subsequently seen in a number of episodes.

== Gallery ==
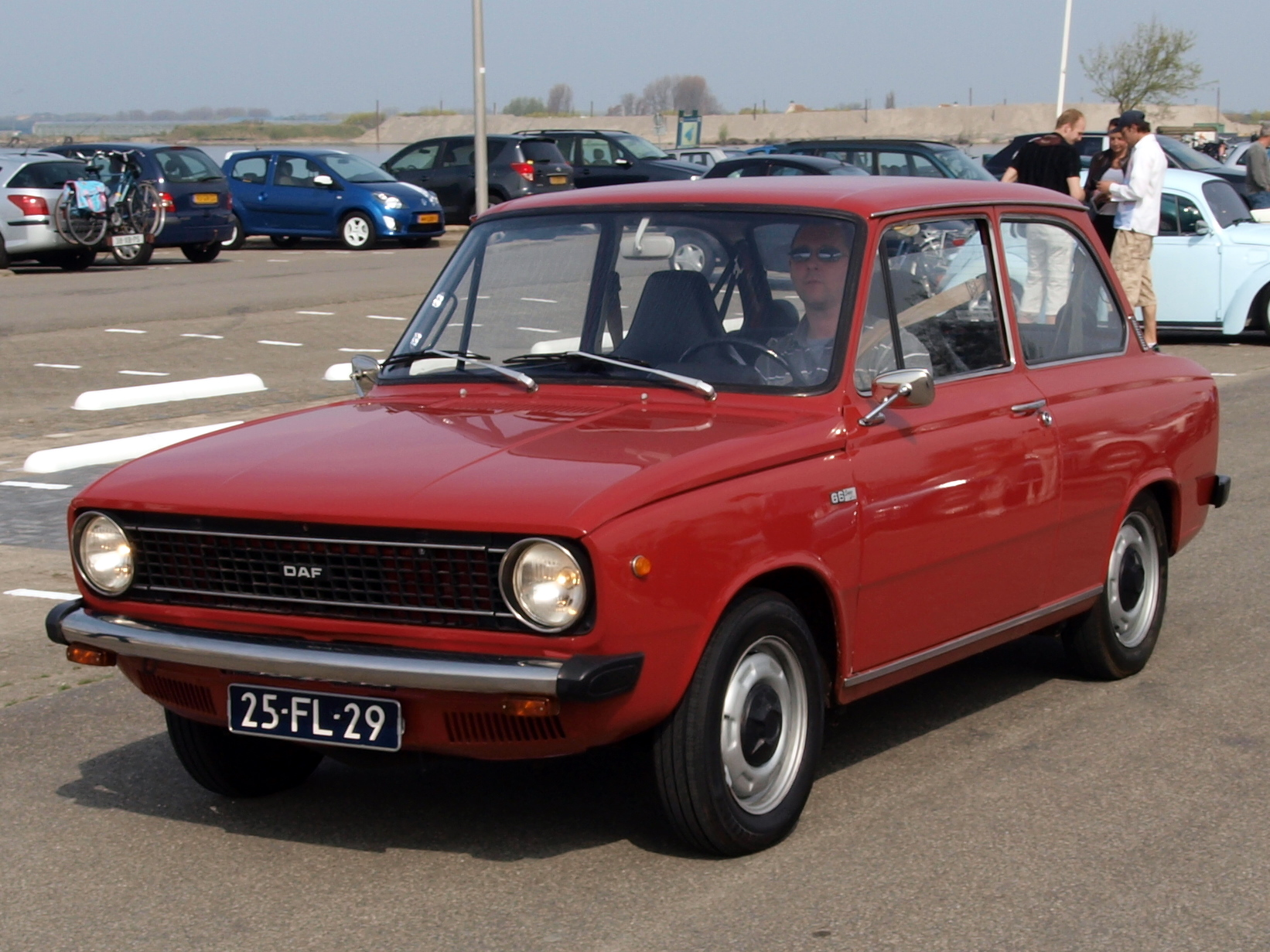
DAF 66 Saloon

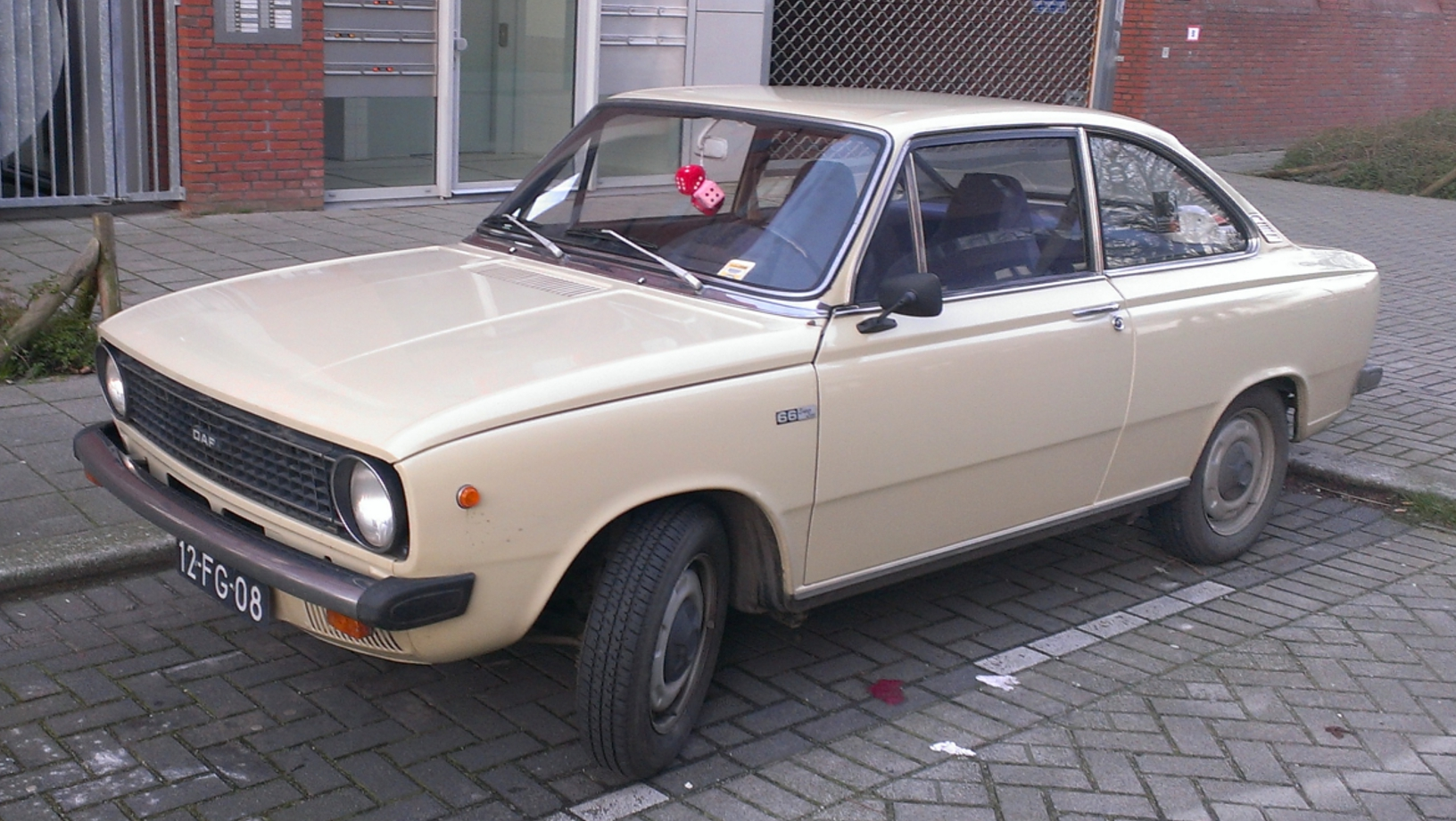
1975 DAF 66 Super Luxe Coupé front

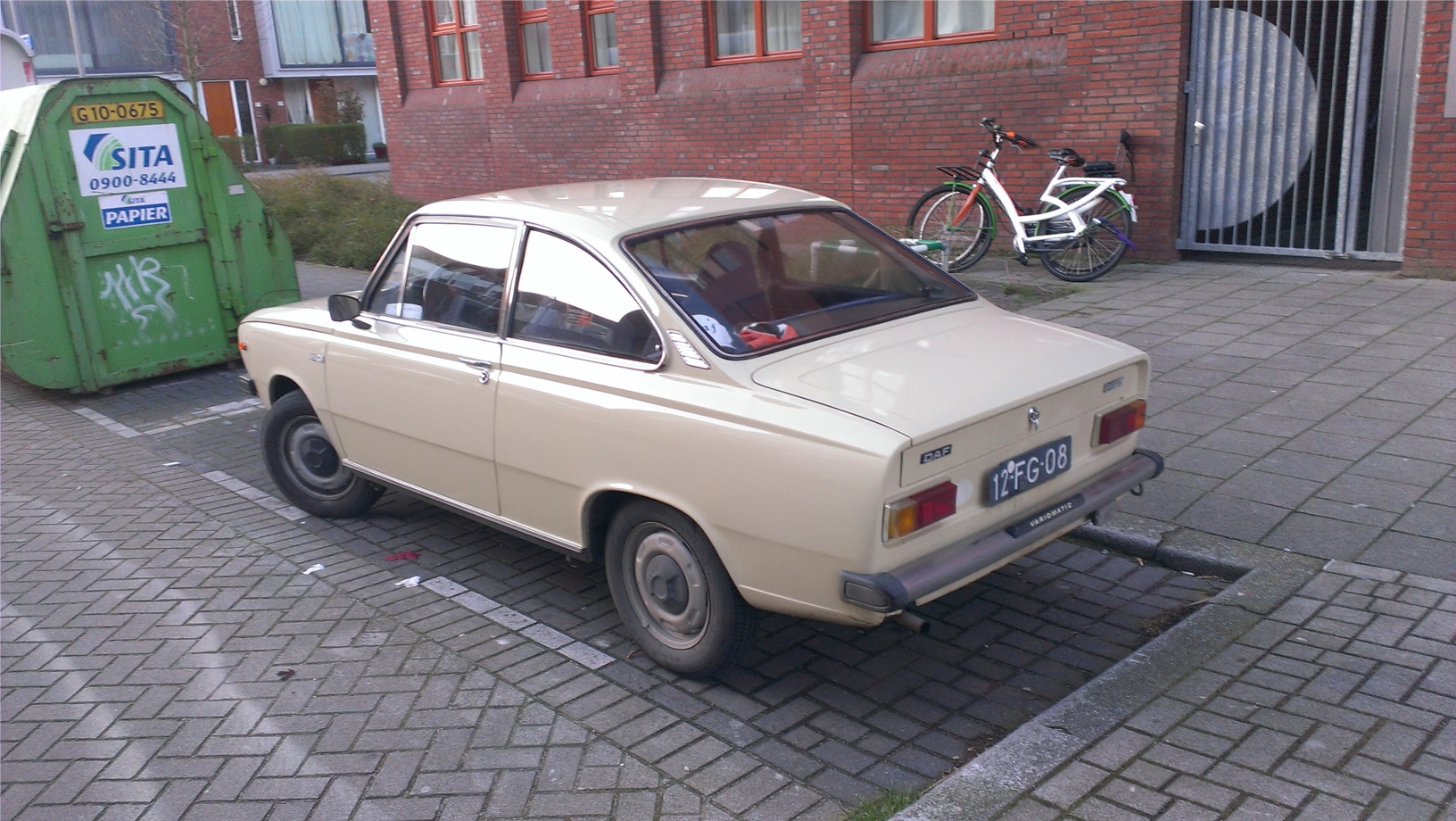
1975 DAF 66 Super Luxe Coupé rear

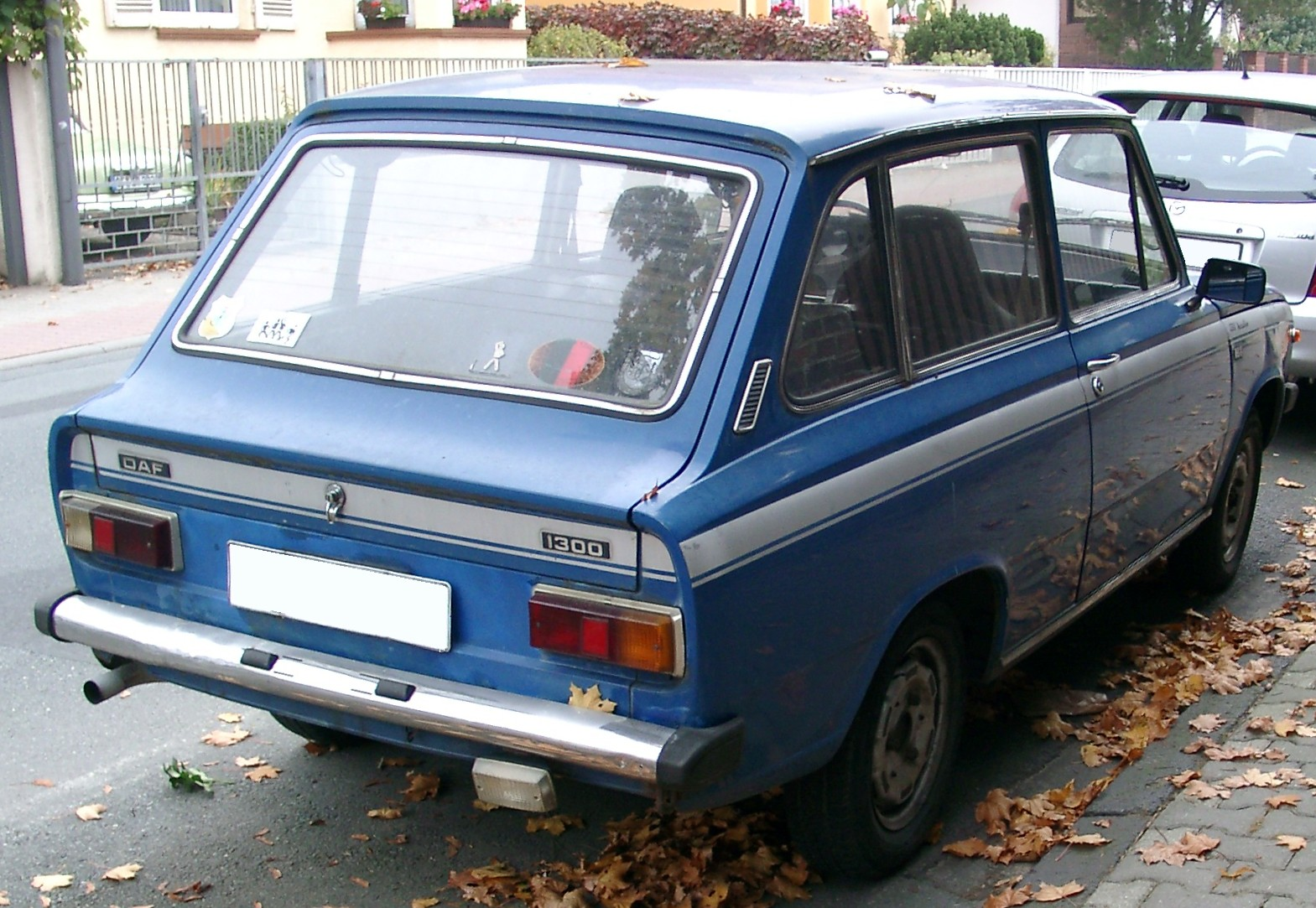
DAF 66 Estate

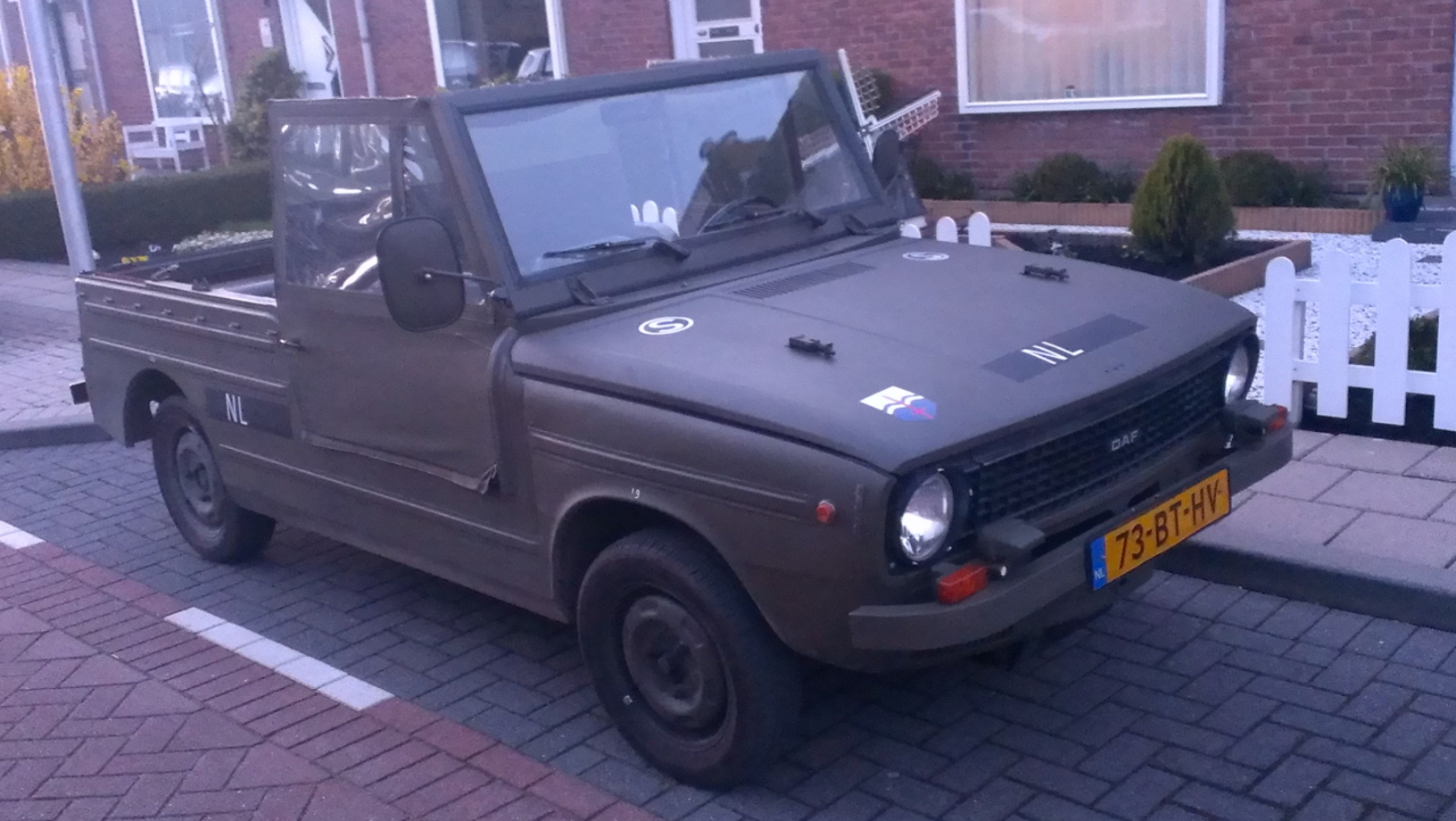
1975 DAF YA 66 front

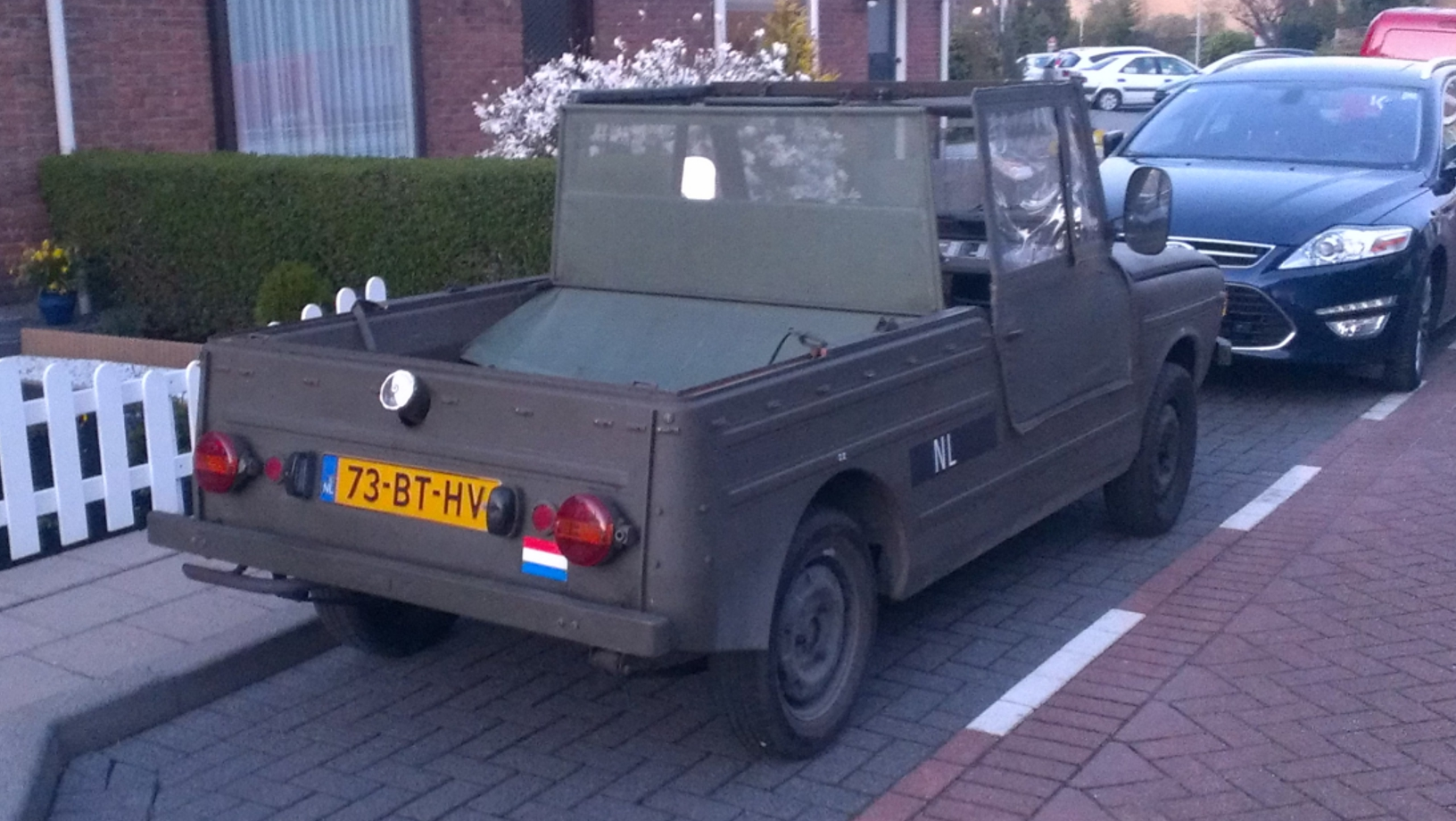
1975 DAF YA 66 rear
