= Volvo 66 =

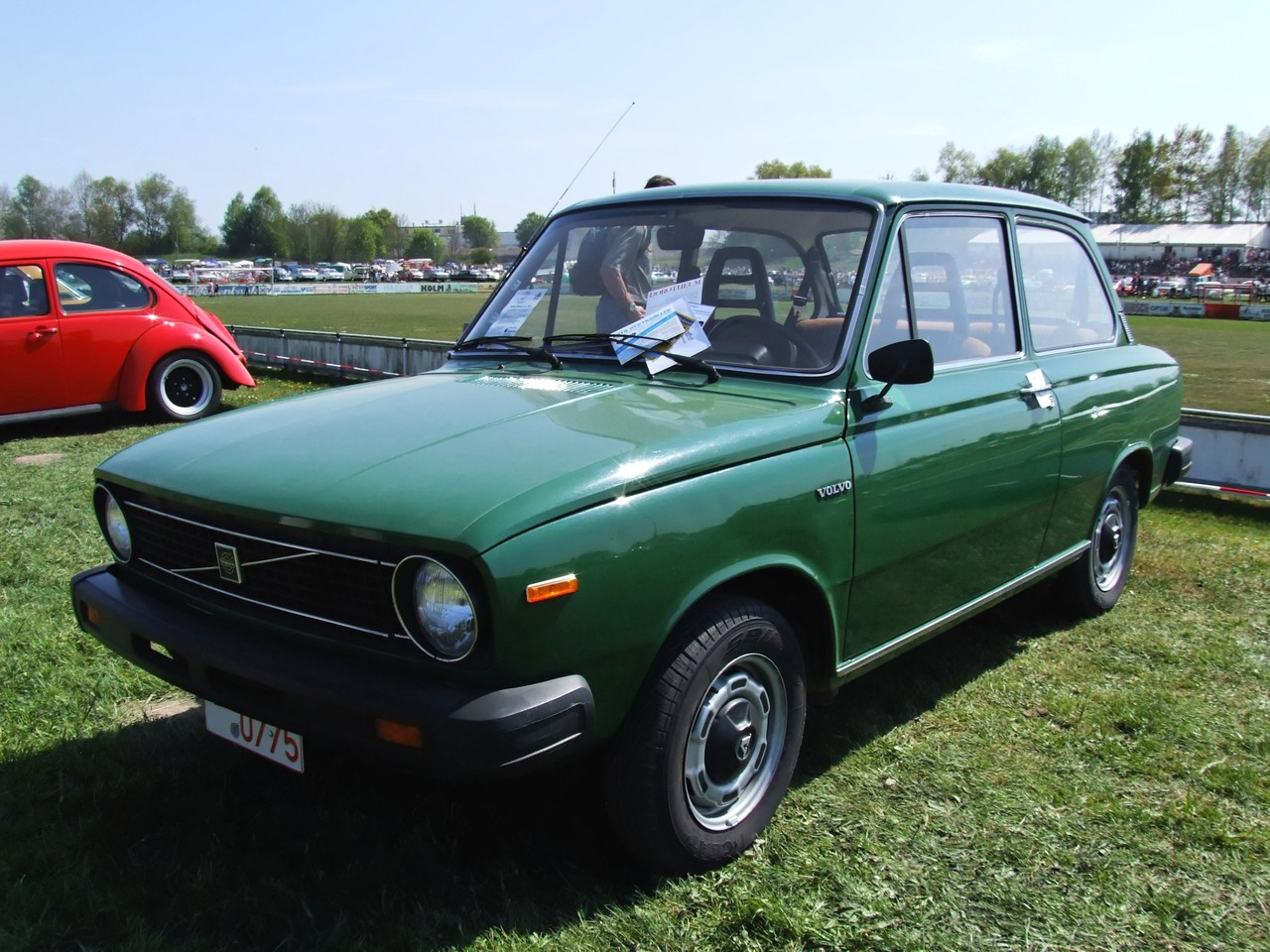
- An L model with single headlamps

Overview
- Manufacturer: Volvo Cars
- Production: 1975–1980
- Assembly: Netherlands: Born (DAF Born)
- Designer: John de Vries

Body and chassis
- Class: Small family car (C)
- Body style: 2-door sedan; 3-door estate
- Layout: FR layout
- Related: DAF 66

Powertrain
- Engine: 1.1 L B110 OHV I4; 1.3 L B130 OHV I4
- Transmission: Variomatic

Chronology
- Predecessor: DAF 66
- Successor: none

The Volvo 66 is an automobile developed from the DAF 66, which was originally styled by Giovanni Michelotti. The compact car was introduced in August 1975, almost exactly a year after Volvo bought DAF, and before production of the Volvo 300 Series began.

== Characteristics ==
The Volvo 66 was known for its continuously variable transmission, the Variomatic. The Volvo version of the car was slightly restyled and given larger bumpers and Volvo-style headrests, similar to those of the Volvo 240. Although this was in keeping with Volvo's emphasis on safety, it also increased its cost of production.

The Volvo 66 was available as a two-door saloon and three-door estate, whilst the two-door Coupé bodystyle available on the DAF 66 was dropped.

The other major features in which the Volvo 66 differs from the DAF 66 are also mostly safety-related. It has different seats featuring headrests, a safety steering wheel, steel side-impact bars in the doors, and a de-clutching servo which enabled the driver to change gear with the choke engaged (in the older DAF models this was not possible, because the increased idle would cause the centrifugal clutch to engage). The Volvo 66 also has a 'park' mode in the CVT, which locks the driveline. From 1977 the estate version featured a window wiper on the bootlid.

== Number produced ==
Volvo produced roughly 106,000 units of both the saloon and estate 66, and no more than 14,000 were sold in the United Kingdom. The majority were sold in continental Europe rather than in Sweden, where the car was never accepted by traditional Volvo buyers.

== Engines ==
- B110 Renault C-series OHV 1108 cc inline-four, 47 PS (35 kW; 46 hp)
- B130 Renault C-series OHV 1289 cc inline-four, 57 PS (42 kW; 56 hp)

== Gallery ==
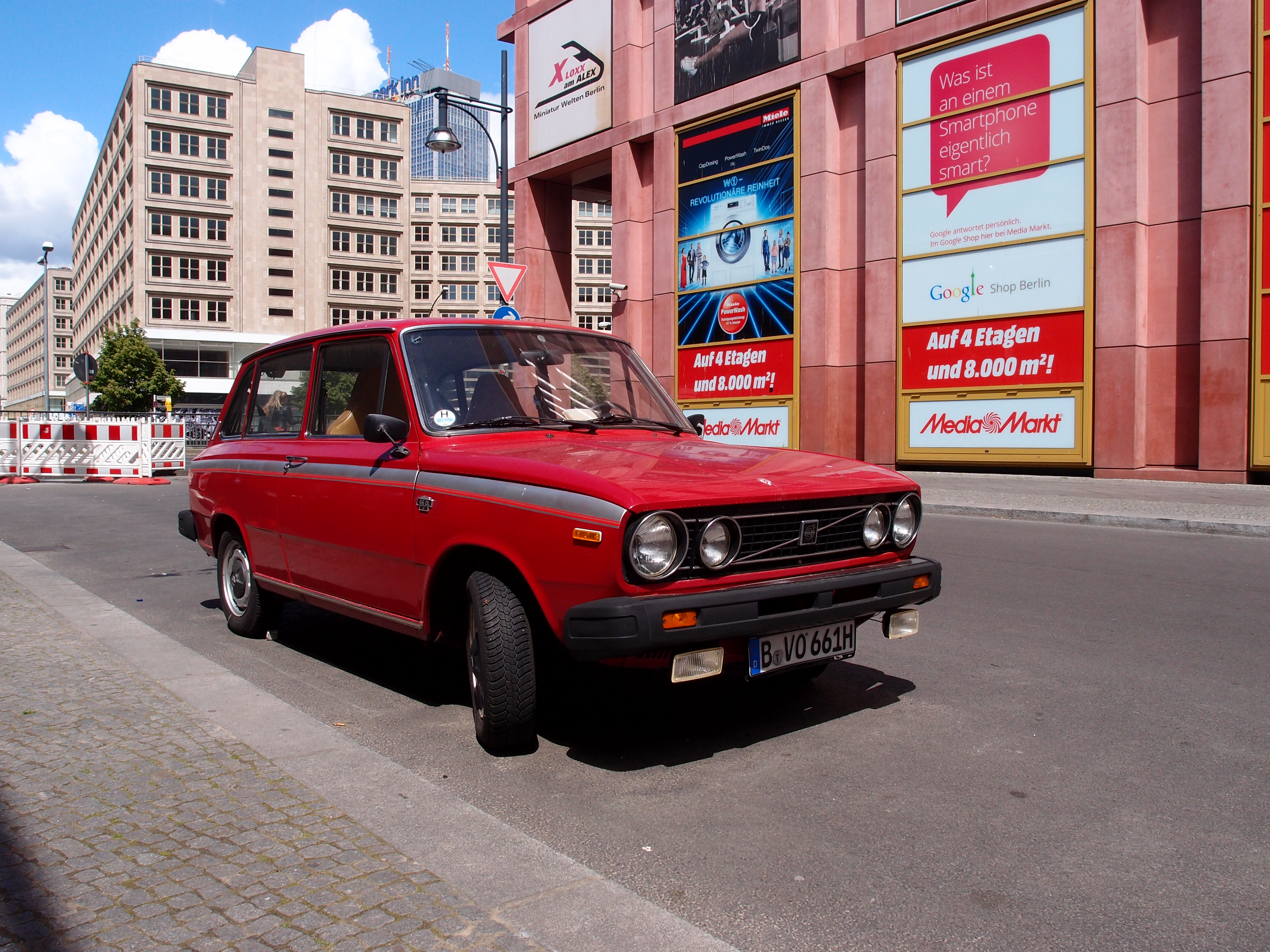
Volvo 66 Estate in Berlin, May 2015
