= Renault Fluence Z.E. =

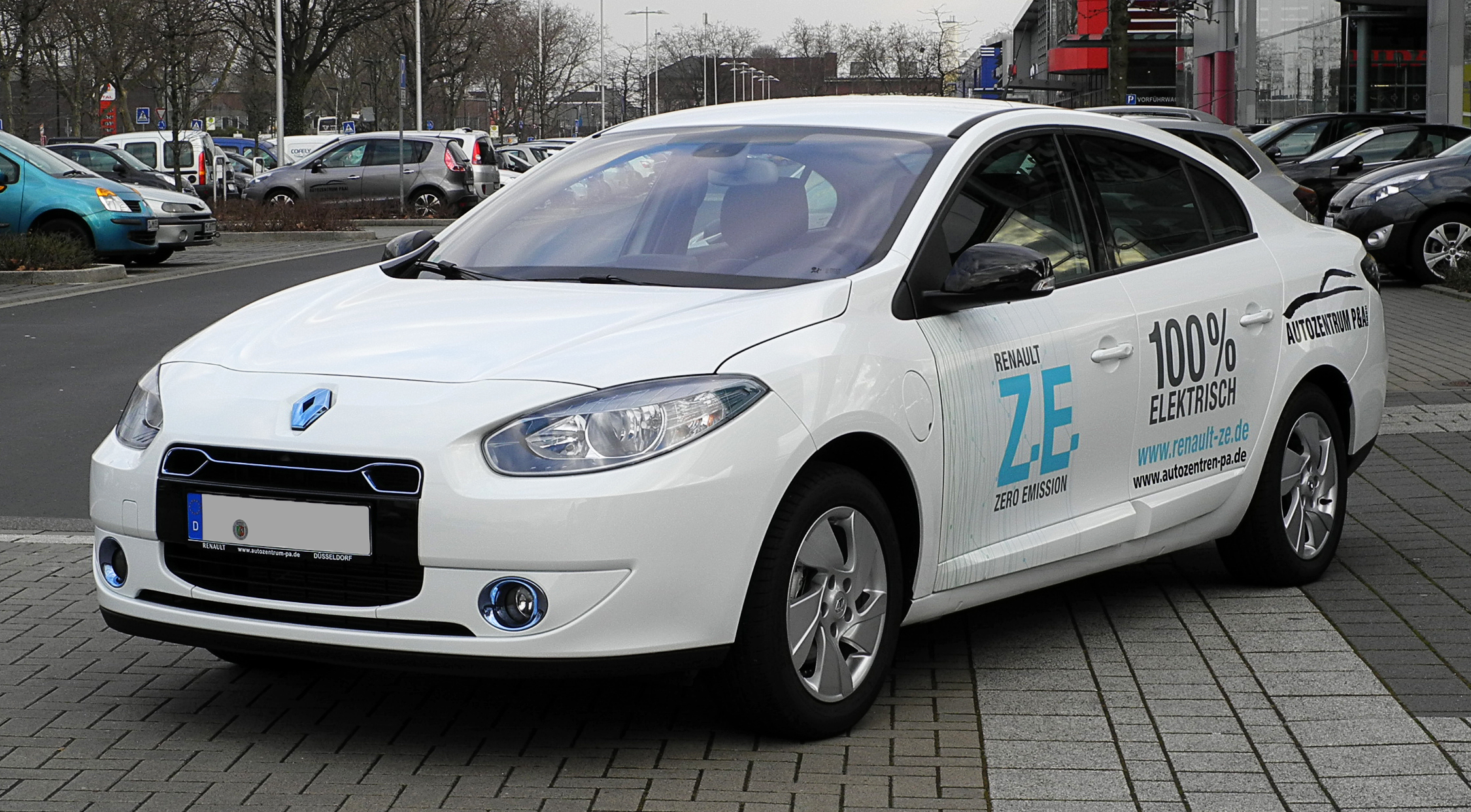
- Renault Fluence Z.E. (Germany)

Overview
- Manufacturer: Renault
- Also called: Renault Samsung SM3 Z.E. (South Korea); Fengnuo E200 (China); Dongfeng Fengnuo E300 EV (China)
- Production: 2011–2014 (Turkey); 2013–2020 (South Korea); 2016 (China, concept only)
- Assembly: Turkey: Bursa (Oyak-Renault); South Korea: Busan (Renault Samsung Motors); China: Wuhan (Dongfeng Renault)

Body and chassis
- Class: Compact car
- Body style: 4-door sedan
- Layout: Front-engine, FWD
- Platform: Renault–Nissan C platform

Powertrain
- Electric motor: 70 kW (94 hp) synchronous motor, 226 N·m (167 lb·ft)
- Battery: 2011–2017: 22 kWh lithium-ion battery; 2018–2020 :36 kWh lithium-ion battery
- Range: 2011–2017: 185 km (115 mi) (NEDC), 145 km (90 mi) (Korean cycle); 2018–2020: 233 km (145 mi) (Korean cycle)
- Plug-in charging: 7 kW on-board charger (max. 240V/30A), optional upgrade to Zoe's Chameleon charger (43kW-380VAC 3phase)

Dimensions
- Wheelbase: 2,701 mm (106.3 in)
- Length: 4,748 mm (186.9 in)
- Width: 1,813 mm (71.4 in)
- Height: 1,458 mm (57.4 in)
- Curb weight: 1,543 kg (3,402 lb)

Chronology
- Successor: Renault Megane E-Tech Electric (spiritual)

The Renault Fluence Z.E. is an electric version of the Renault Fluence compact sedan, part of the Renault Z.E. program of battery electric vehicles. It was unveiled by Renault at the 2009 Frankfurt Motor Show. The Fluence Z.E. is outfitted with a 22 kWh lithium-ion battery which allows a total all-electric range of 185 km (115 mi) measured on the NEDC combined cycle, with speeds up to 135 km/h (84 mph).

The Fluence Z.E. was the first modern electric car known to be enabled with battery swapping technology and deployed within the Better Place network in Israel and Denmark in 2012. A total of 948 Better Place branded Fluence Z.E. cars were deployed in Israel and around 400 units sold in Denmark by May 2013, when Better Place filed for bankruptcy. The Better Place version was built at the Oyak-Renault plant in Bursa, Turkey, like the main Fluence trims.

As the Fluence Z.E. phased out, a fixed-battery version called Renault Samsung SM3 ZE was launched in South Korea. It was one of the most popular electric cars in South Korea in the mid-2010s, with thousands sold through 2017. Global sales totaled 10,600 units through December 2019, mostly composed of SM3 Z.E. units.

While Renault didn't offer the hatchback equivalent based on the Megane III hatchback (which the Fluence Z.E. was based on), they later replaced the Fluence Z.E. with a newer, hatchback-only Megane E-Tech Electric.

== Specifications ==
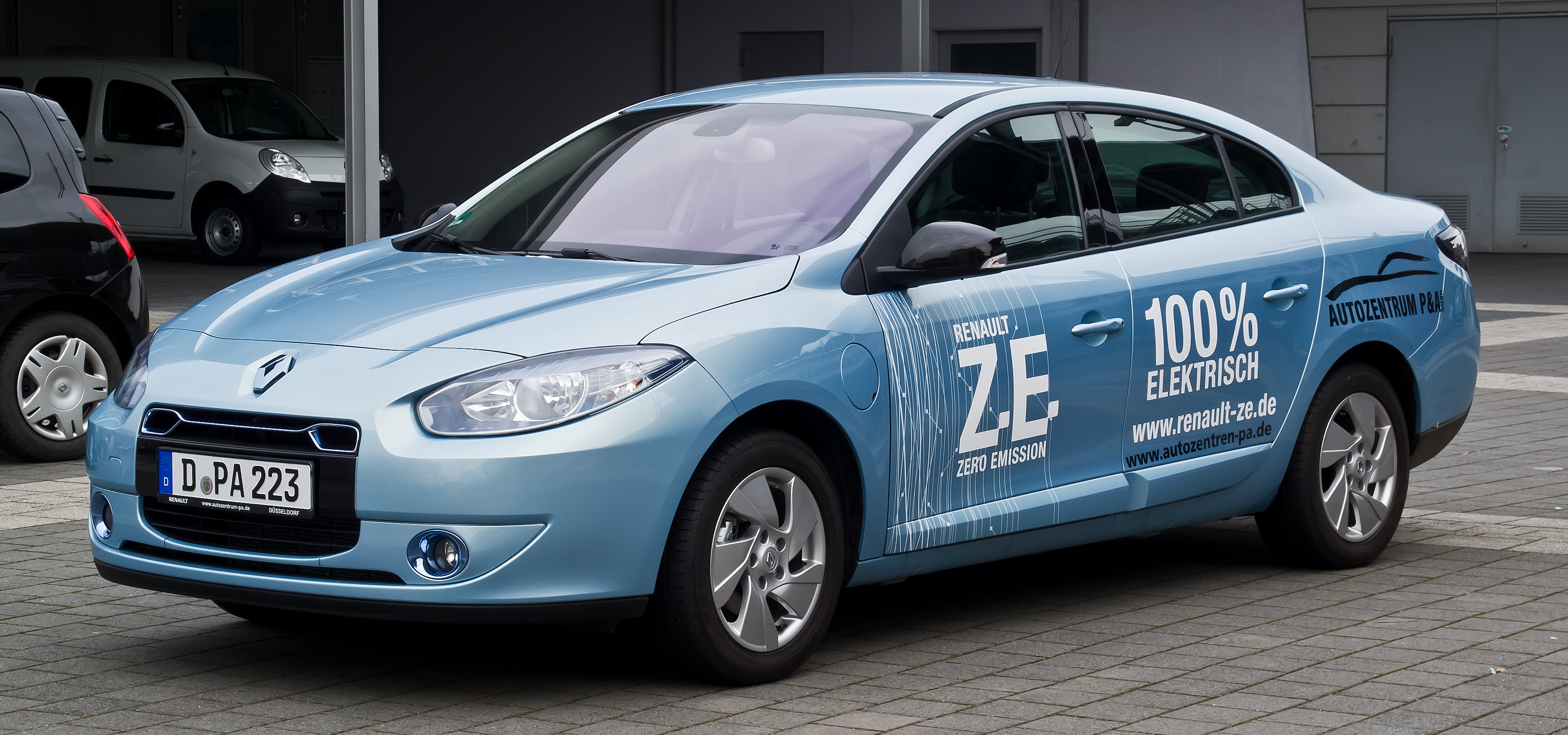
Fluence Z.E frontal view

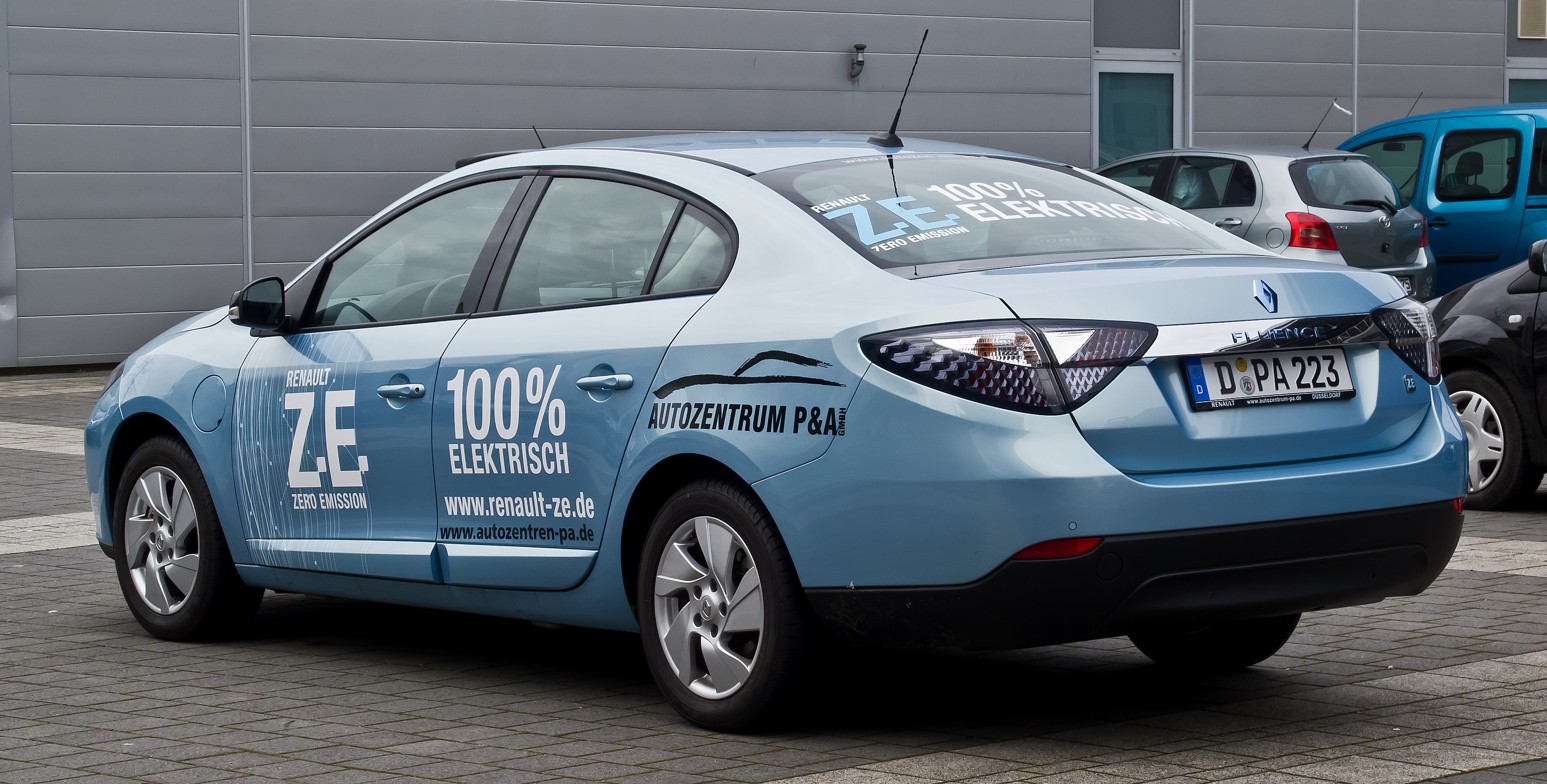
Fluence Z.E. rear view

The lithium-ion battery had a capacity of 22 kWh and weighed 250 kg (551 lb). For the 2018 model year, the Korean Samsung version received an upgrade to 36 kWh.

The Fluence Z.E. is 13 cm (5.1 in) longer than the internal combustion model to accommodate the battery behind the rear seats. The planned Renault battery plant near Paris that was to supply batteries for the vehicle was delayed due to technical constraints. Instead, Renault obtained batteries from LG Chem of South Korea.

Battery charging capabilities included:

- using 10 A 220-240 V household mains power from a standard electrical outlet in 10–12 hours
- using 16 A with a 3 kW public charge spot or specifically installed home charging spot in 6–9 hours
- the battery uses a "QuickDrop" system that allows it to be quickly switched for a charged battery at a dedicated battery exchange facility.

The Fluence Z.E. used a synchronous electric motor with rotor coil, weighing 160 kg (350 lb). Its peak power is 70 kW (94 hp) at 11,000rpm, while maximum torque is 226 N⋅m (167 lbf⋅ft).

The Fluences used a PRND gate selector as well as providing a small amount of creep in 'D' to emulate the behaviour of traditional internal combustion engine equipped automatic transmission cars.

=== Safety ===
This test drive of the Renault Fluence Z.E. demonstrates its quietness.

Euro NCAP test results Renault Fluence ZE (2011)
Test	Points	%
Overall:	4 /5 stars	
Adult occupant:	26	72%
Child occupant:	41	83%
Pedestrian:	13	37%
Safety assist:	6	84%

== Better Place battery swap ==
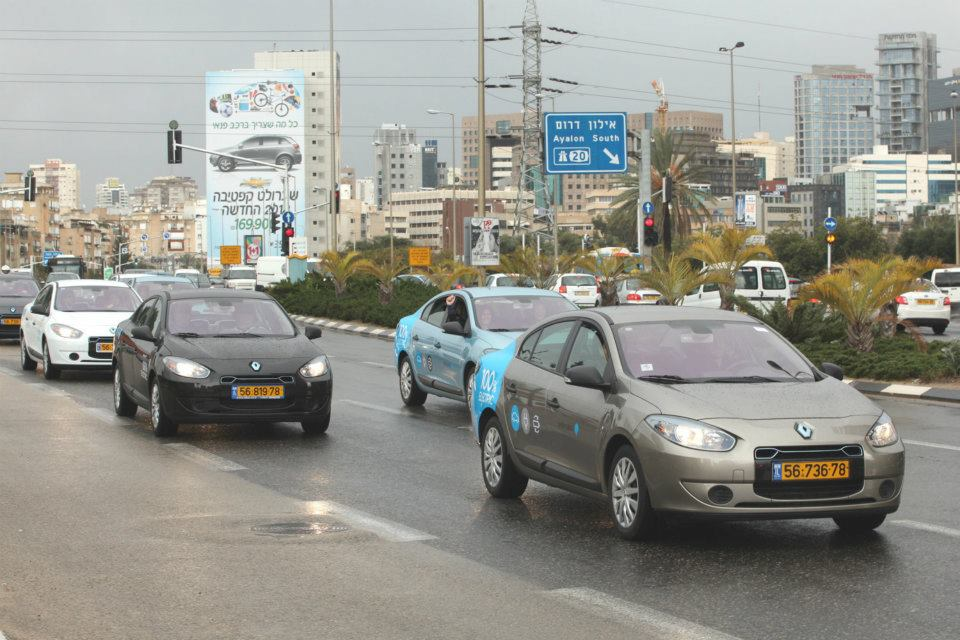
Parade of Renault Fluence Z.E. electric cars enabled with battery swapping technology to commemorate the first deliveries to Better Place employees in Israel in January 2012.

Better Place and Renault announced the Fluence Z.E. was the first modern electric car with a swappable battery available on the Better Place electric vehicle network with (QuickDrop) battery swapping technology. Battery switching or swapping is a technology that enables the driver to swap a depleted battery with a fully charged one by going through a battery switch station. In a demonstration with electric taxi cabs run in Tokyo until the end of 2010, the trial battery switch station allowed drivers to exchange their car's depleted battery pack for a 100 miles (160 km) fully recharged one in 59.1 seconds on average. In August 2010 Better Place announced a non-binding order of 100,000 Renault Fluence ZE and four months later Better Place claimed to have sold 70,000 cars from that order, a year away from the public launch of the Better Place network.

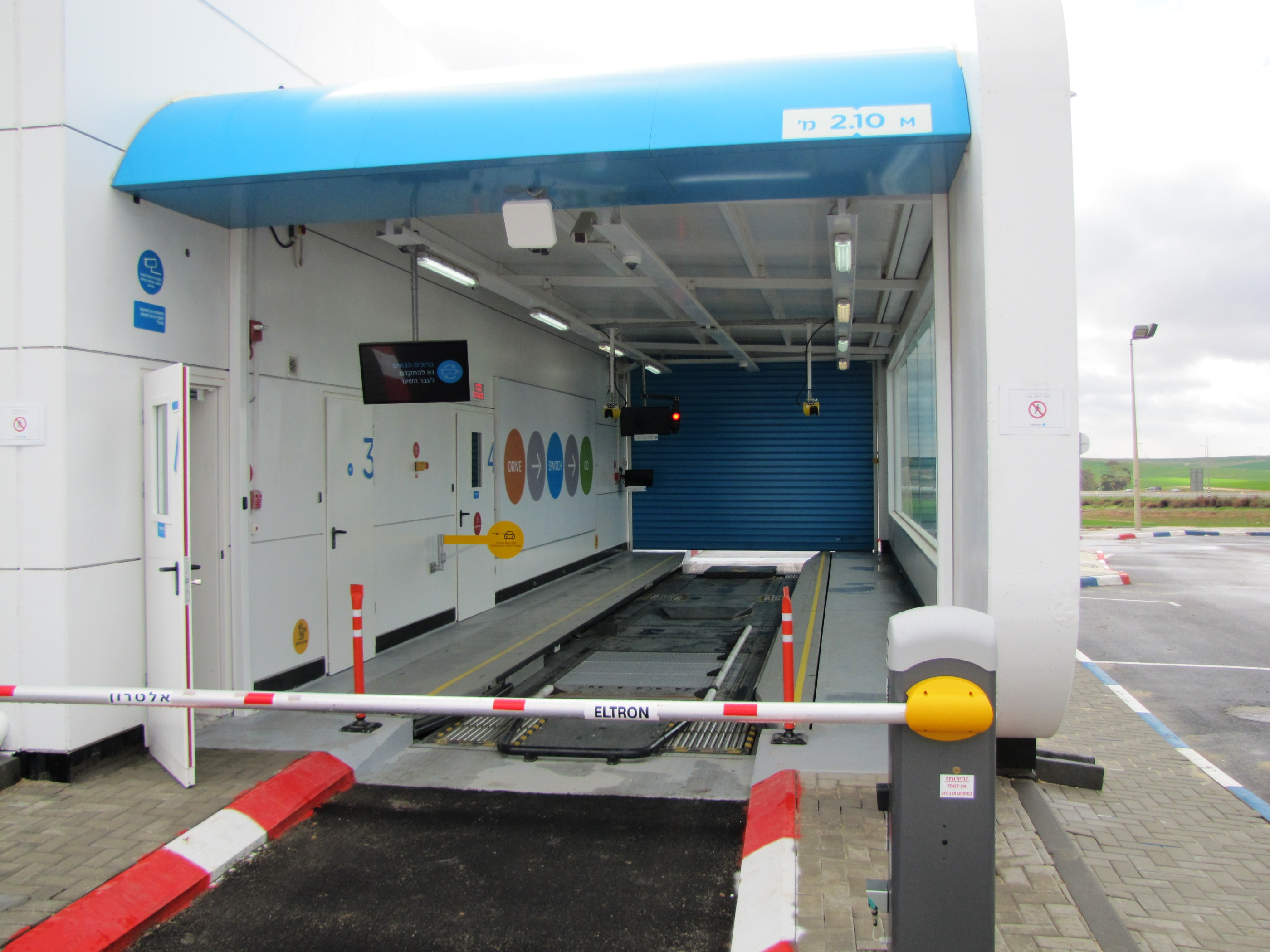
Better Place's battery switching Station in Israel

Better Place customers needed only to drive up to the entrance of a battery switch station to start the switch process. The Oscar in-car navigation system uses a WiFi connection to communicate with the station's computers and an RFID tag on the windscreen of the subscriber's car identifies it. The barrier opens and the customer drives up to a mark. The dashboard screen and external monitors then give instructions to select Neutral and turn off the ignition. The remaining process is fully automated, similar to going through a car wash, so the driver never has to leave the car. In just a few minutes, a robot beneath the car removes the depleted battery and replaces it with a full one. Once complete, instruction is given to restart the car and an exit barrier lifts.

After implementing the first modern commercial deployment of the battery swapping model in Israel and Denmark, Better Place filed for bankruptcy in Israel in May 2013. The company's financial difficulties were caused by the high investment required to develop the charging and swapping infrastructure, about US$850 million in private capital, and a market penetration significantly lower than originally predicted. About 1,000 Fluence Z.E.s were deployed in Israel, and around 400 units in Denmark through May 2013 when Better Place filed for bankruptcy.

== Markets ==
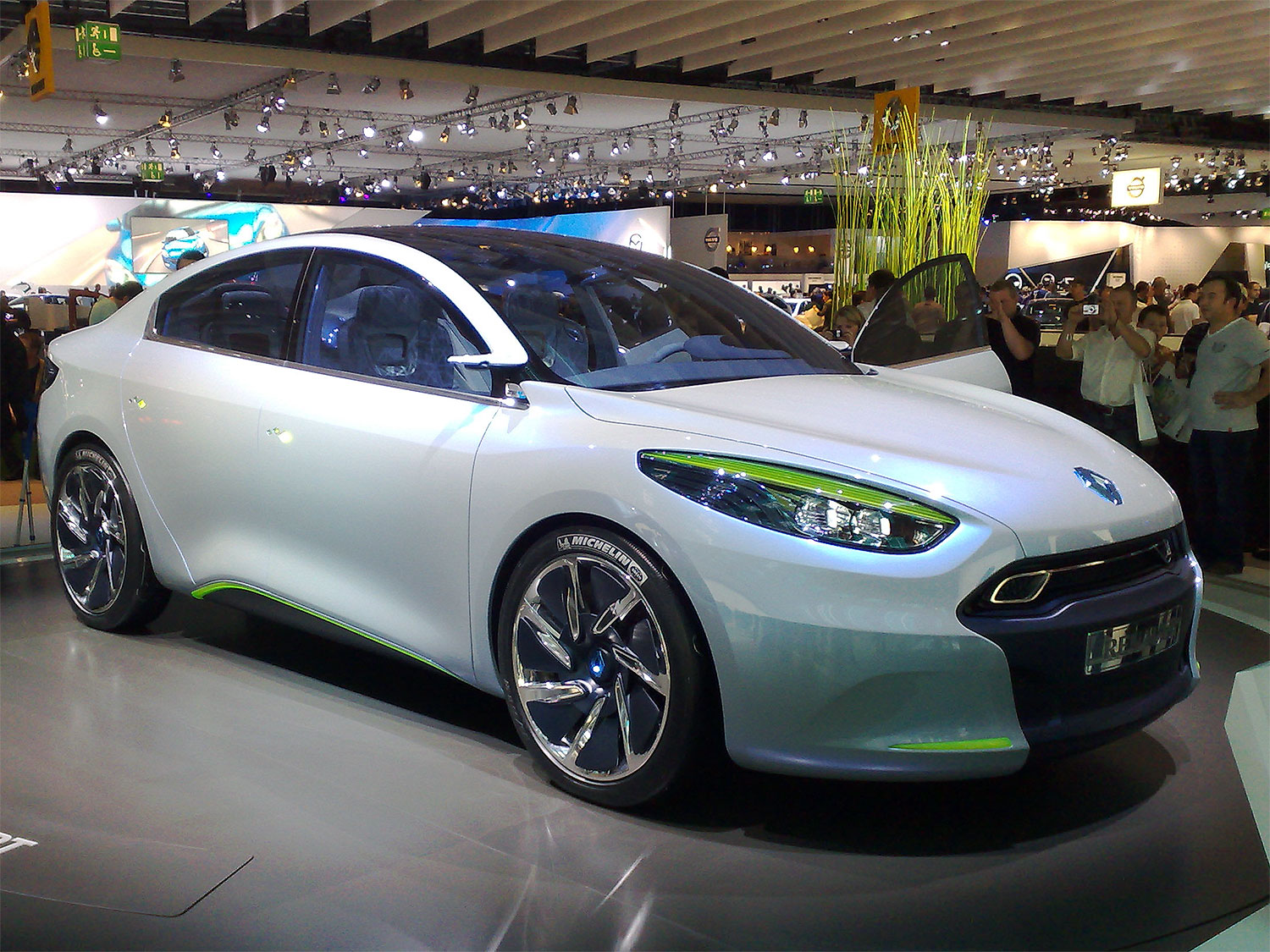
Fluence Z.E. Concept unveiled in the 2009 Frankfurt Motor Show.

The Fluence Z.E. is available in several European countries and also was sold in Israel through the Better Place network. Since retail sales began in 2011, a total of 3,935 units have been sold worldwide through October 2014. of which, 2,384 units were registered in Europe through October 2014. and around 1,000 units were sold in Israel through May 2013. As of December 2019, combined global sales since inception of the Fluence Z.E. and SM3 Z.E. totaled 10,600 units.

=== Australia ===
Unveiled at the 2011 Australian International Motor Show in Melbourne, the Fluence Z.E. was scheduled to be sold by mid-2012, once the roll out of Better Place's battery swap network had begun, initiating in Canberra. In 2011 GE pledged to purchase at least 1,000 of the vehicles in Australia, which would contribute to their goal of purchasing 25,000 electric vehicles globally by 2015. In December 2012, Renault announced that the launch of the Fluence Z.E. was postponed indefinitely following delays with the roll out of Australia's electric vehicle infrastructure. The electric car was scheduled to go on sale to the public from a number of dealers across the country in the fourth quarter of 2012. Better Place explained that delays in the deployments in Israel and Denmark reflected in the Australian roll out, which would take place between 12 and 18 months behind the other markets. However, Better Place filed for bankruptcy in May 2013.

=== China ===
In the 2016 Beijing Auto Show, Dongfeng Renault released a China-made version of the SM3 Z.E. as the Dongfeng Fengnuo E300 EV. However, the car never made it into mass production, possibly because China's EV range standards and associated subsidies were rapidly tightened in the following years.

=== Denmark ===
The Fluence Z.E. was sold in Denmark at a price of 205,000 DKK (€27,496 or US$38,378) including VAT plus the monthly fee for the switchable-battery. Consumers also paid a one-time fee of 9,995 DKK (€1,341) for a private charging station and Better Place offered a choice of five fixed-price switchable-battery packages based on kilometers driven per year. For more than 40,000 km (25,000 mi) a year the monthly fee was 2,995 DKK (€399) per month.

The first Better Place battery switch station in Denmark, out of 20 planned to be deployed across the country until March 2012, was unveiled in June 2011 at Gladsaxe, near Copenhagen. As of December 2012 there were 17 battery switch stations fully operational in the country. Sales through Better Place began in late 2011, and 198 units were sold in Denmark through December 2012. Cumulative sales through April 2013 reached 234 units. However, Better Place reported between 400 and 500 customers by the time the company filed for bankruptcy in May 2013. Renault announced it will continue to provide service for the Fluence Z.E. in Denmark.

=== Estonia ===
In Estonia, Fluence Z.E was originally part of the ELMO program, but has been removed, no reason was given, but it may relate to the lack of availability of the car in Estonia.

=== France ===
In France, 2012 prices started from €26,300 before the applicable €5,000 government incentive. The monthly fee for the switchable-battery service start from €82 including VAT. Since 2010, a total of 727 Fluence Z.E.s have been registered in France through October 2014.

=== Israel ===
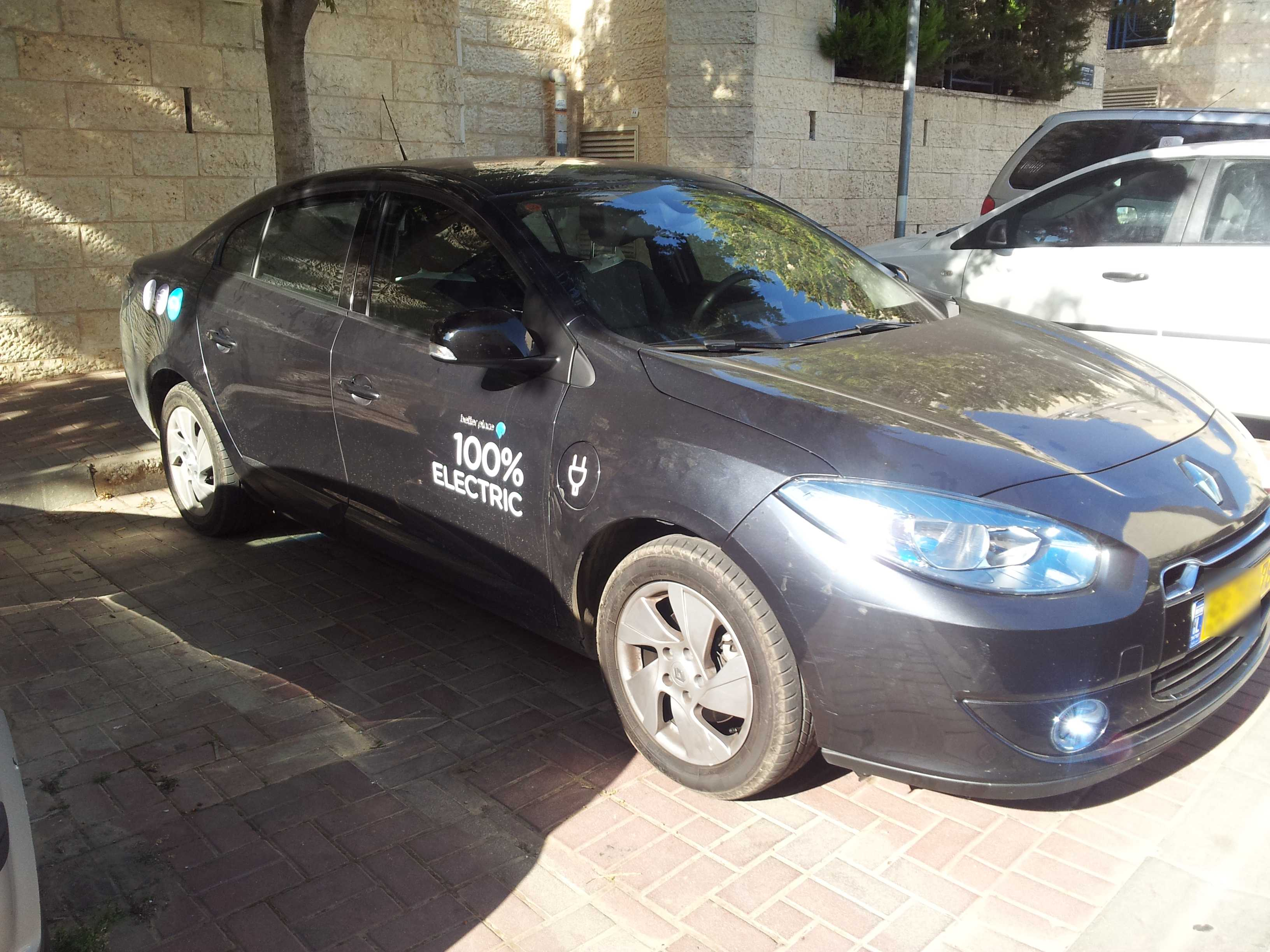
Renault Fluence Z.E. sold through Better Place in Israel.

Orders for the Renault Fluence ZE began in July 2011 starting at NIS 123,000 (€24.580, US$35,114), a price slightly higher than gasoline-powered car of similar size. Better Place offered five service packages in Israel. The service plans were priced according to annual mileage and also include installation and maintenance of a home recharging station, free access to Better Place's battery replacement stations, battery availability, a computerized driver support system, navigation aids, and roadside service. The cheapest monthly package was NIS 1,090 (€218, US$311) for up to 20,000 km (12,000 mi) a year, and the more expensive was NIS 1,599 (€320 /US$456) for less than 30,000 km (19,000 mi) a year. These prices included VAT. There was also a special plan that includes the cost of the Fluence Z.E. and a 3-year unlimited-mileage package (up to 25,000 km (16,000 mi) a year) for a total of NIS 157,500 (€31,775, US$45,000).

The first Fluence Z.E. production models were delivered in Israel in January 2012, and nearly 100 units allocated among the Better Place employees. Retail customer deliveries began in the second quarter of 2012. As of December 2012, a total of 518 cars were sold in the country. Sales during the first months of 2013 improved with a total 422 units were sold, bringing the total to 940 units. After Better Place filed for bankruptcy in May 2013, the court liquidator will have to decide what to do with customers who do not have ownership of the battery and risk being left with a useless car. Under Better Place's business model, the company owns the Fluence Z.E. batteries. Shortly thereafter, Renault announced it will continue to provide service for the Fluence Z.E. in Israel. The liquidator will also have to decide about the future of the swap stations.

=== South Korea ===
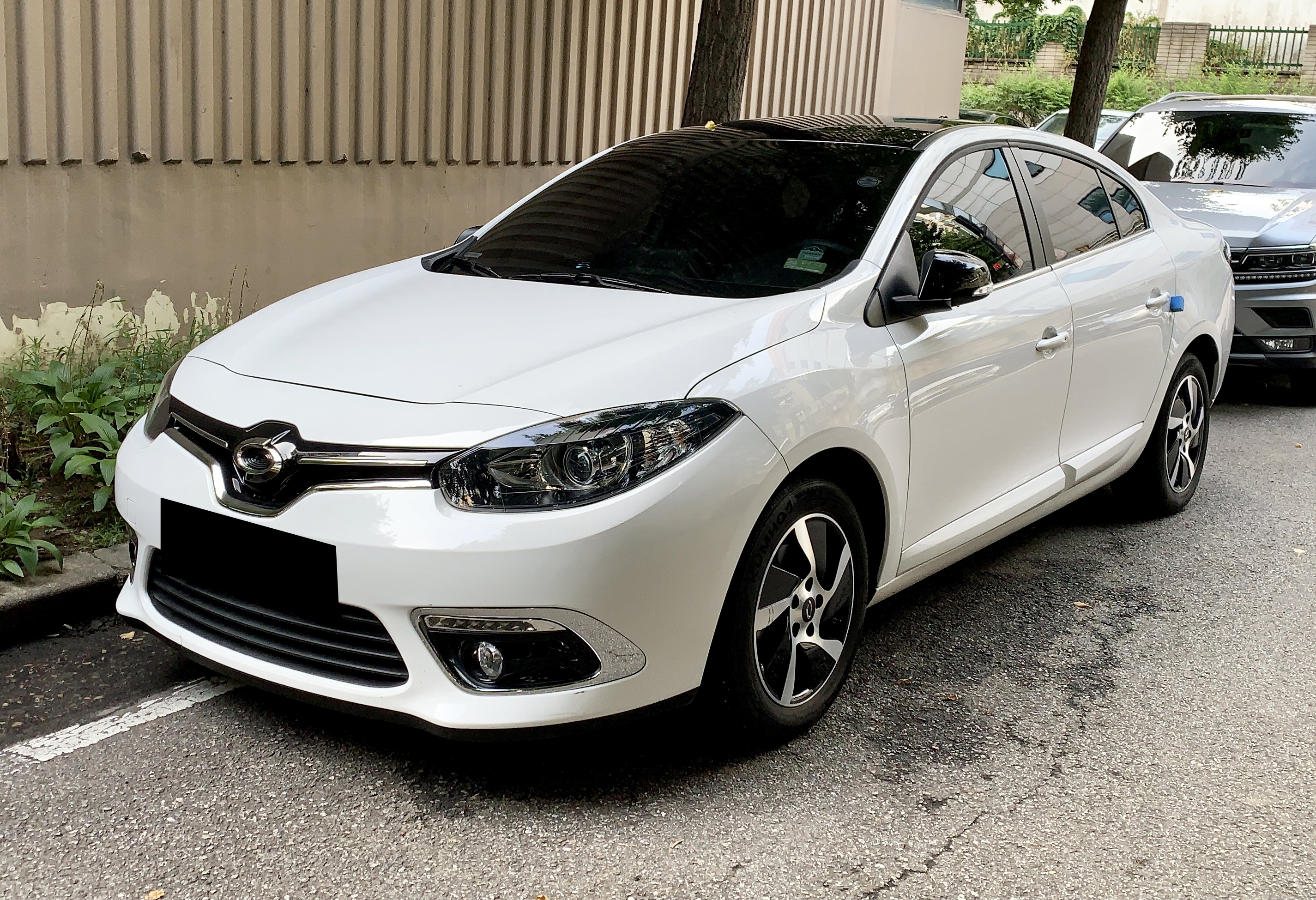
Renault Samsung SM3 Z.E.

The Fluence Z.E. is sold in South Korea as the SM3 Z.E. under the Renault Samsung Motors badge. The SM3 Z.E. was unveiled at the 2011 Seoul Motor Show, and entered into series production at the Busan factory during October 2013. The company set a production target of about 4,000 units per year and it is partly financed by the South Korean Government. In 2013, its second year in the market and the first of South Korean assembly, the SM3 Z.E. led electric vehicle sales in the country, capturing a 58% market share of the segment and 453 cars sold that year. The company attributed this to its AC-3 charger, its greater range compared to rivals and a better warranty for the battery.

By the late 2010s the SM3 ZE's role in Korea's EV market diminished, as longer-range models such as Tesla Model 3, Chevrolet Bolt and SUVs from Hyundai-Kia began to dominate. However, as of 2019, the SM3 was still available in Korean market with a 36 kWh battery. Renault Samsung's Electric Vehicle line-up is to undergo expansion in 2022, but it discontinued in 2020.

=== Türkiye ===
Renault Fluence Z.E was presumably planned to be also released in Turkey, its country of assembly, at the end of 2011. 215 units of Fluence ZE were sold in Turkiye until 2013.

=== United Kingdom ===
The Fluence Z.E. was released in the United Kingdom in the Spring of 2012 though was withdrawn from sale in 2014. The batteries required a mandatory lease which according to Renault, was the UK's most affordable electric car. By not having to purchase the battery - a value in excess of £7,000 - any issues with the battery over dead cells or depleted range issues are dealt with by an immediate exchange at no additional cost to the owner.

Renault sold only 79 units before the model was discontinued.

== Sales ==
Year	Worldwide Sales
2011	762
2012	2086
2013	796
2014	203
2015	at least 640
2016	623
2017	2014

== See also ==
- Elect'road plug-in hybrid van
- Government incentives for plug-in electric vehicles
- List of electric cars currently available
- List of modern production plug-in electric vehicles
- List of production battery electric vehicles
- Plug-in electric vehicle
- Renault Kangoo Express Z.E.
- Renault Twizy
- Renault Zoe
- Zero-emissions vehicle
