= Renault Z.E. =

Electric automobile model

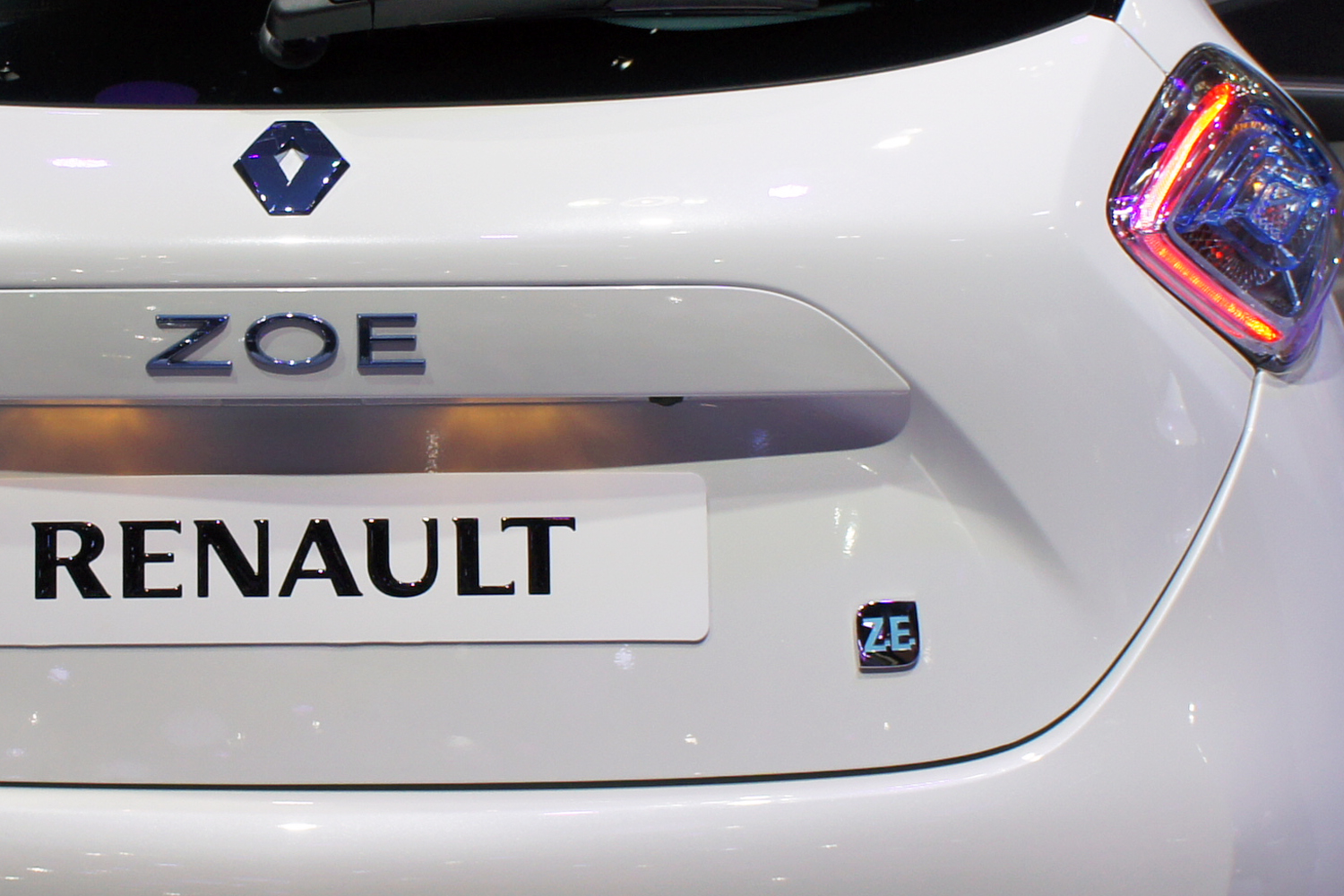
- Renault Zero Emissions (ZE) badge, shown in a Renault Zoe.
- Introduced: 2009
- Discontinued: 2021 (replaced by Renault E-Tech Electric)

The Renault Z.E. (Z.E. stands for Zero Emission) is a line of all-electric cars from Renault. The line began with the Z.E series of concept cars. The first production car is the Renault Fluence Z.E. that was slated for sales to the public in Israel and Denmark by late 2011 as part of the Better Place network, operated by Renault Fluence ZE cars. In 2011 Renault was awarded a contract to supply 15,600 electric vehicles to the French government and the state-owned postal service, La Poste. The vehicles are to contribute to a planned 25,000 electric vehicle fleet owned by the French government.

The Z.E. branding is also used for Renault Trucks's electric models, despite being a separate company.

Global Renault Z.E. vehicle sales passed the 100,000 unit milestone in September 2016. The Renault Zoe is the ZE top selling model, and global sales of the electric city car achieved the 150,000 unit milestone in June 2019.

In 2021 the Z.E. brand was phased out with existing Z.E. models rebranded as E-Tech Electric.

== Concept cars ==
=== 2008 Paris Motor Show ===
The first model in the Z.E. project was a concept based on the Renault Kangoo Be Bop. It debuted at the 2008 Paris Motor Show

It has its compact dimensions (length: 3.95 m (156 in), height: 1.85 m (73 in). The Z.E. Concept is powered by a 70 kW electric motor with torque of 226 N⋅m (167 lbf⋅ft) and its lithium-ion batteries give 200 km electric range. Solar panels positioned on the roof power a temperature regulation system.

Estimated price is 16,000 €.

=== 2009 Frankfurt Motor Show ===
In 2009 at the Frankfurt Motor Show, Renault extended the concept from one model to four:

- Fluence Z.E. five-seat saloon which implements Renault's "Quickdrop" rapid battery exchange system that is compatible with Better Place's electric vehicle network
- Kangoo Z.E. van
- Twizy Z.E. ultra-compact city car
- Zoe Z.E. supermini
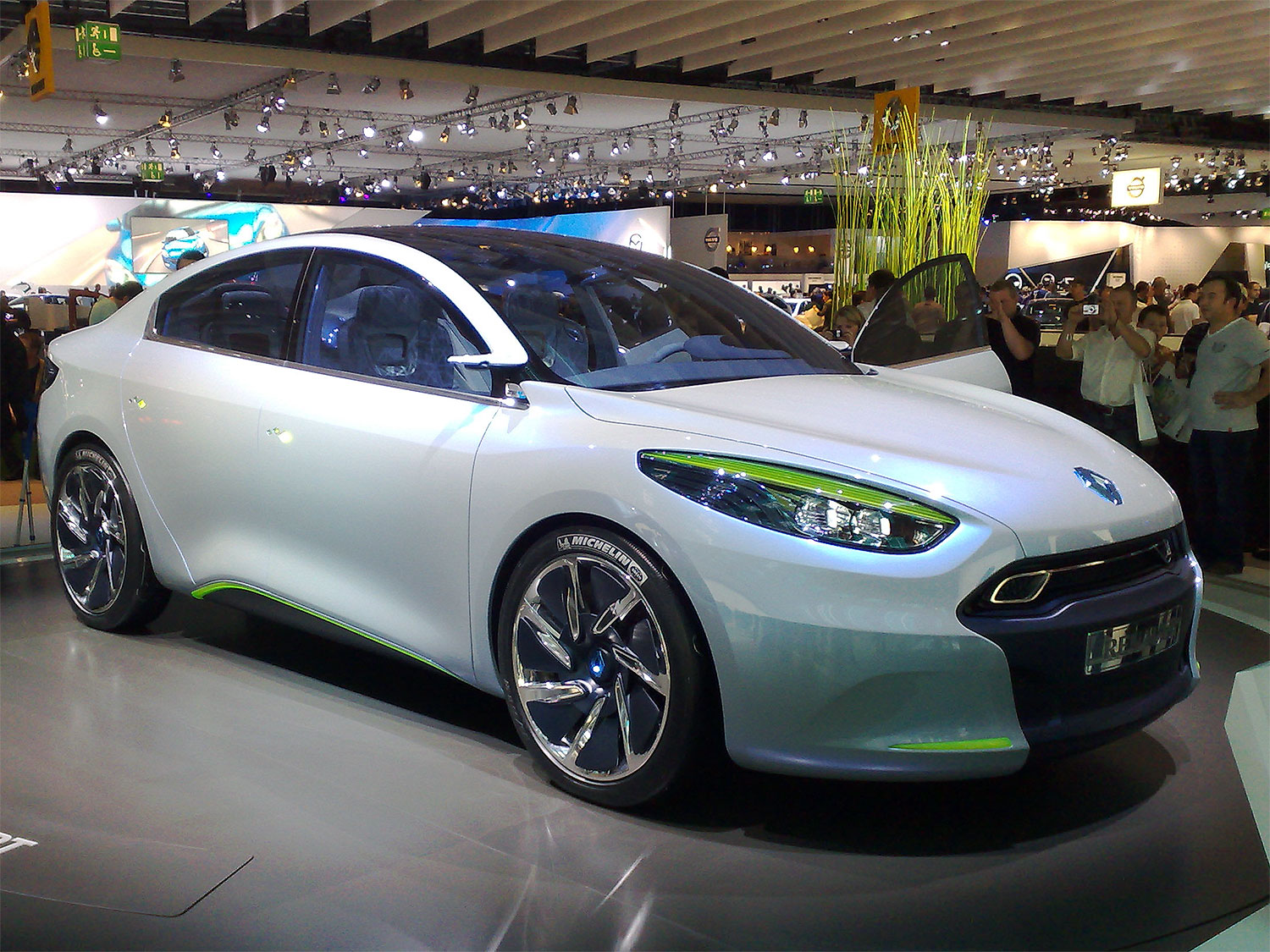
Renault Fluence Z.E.

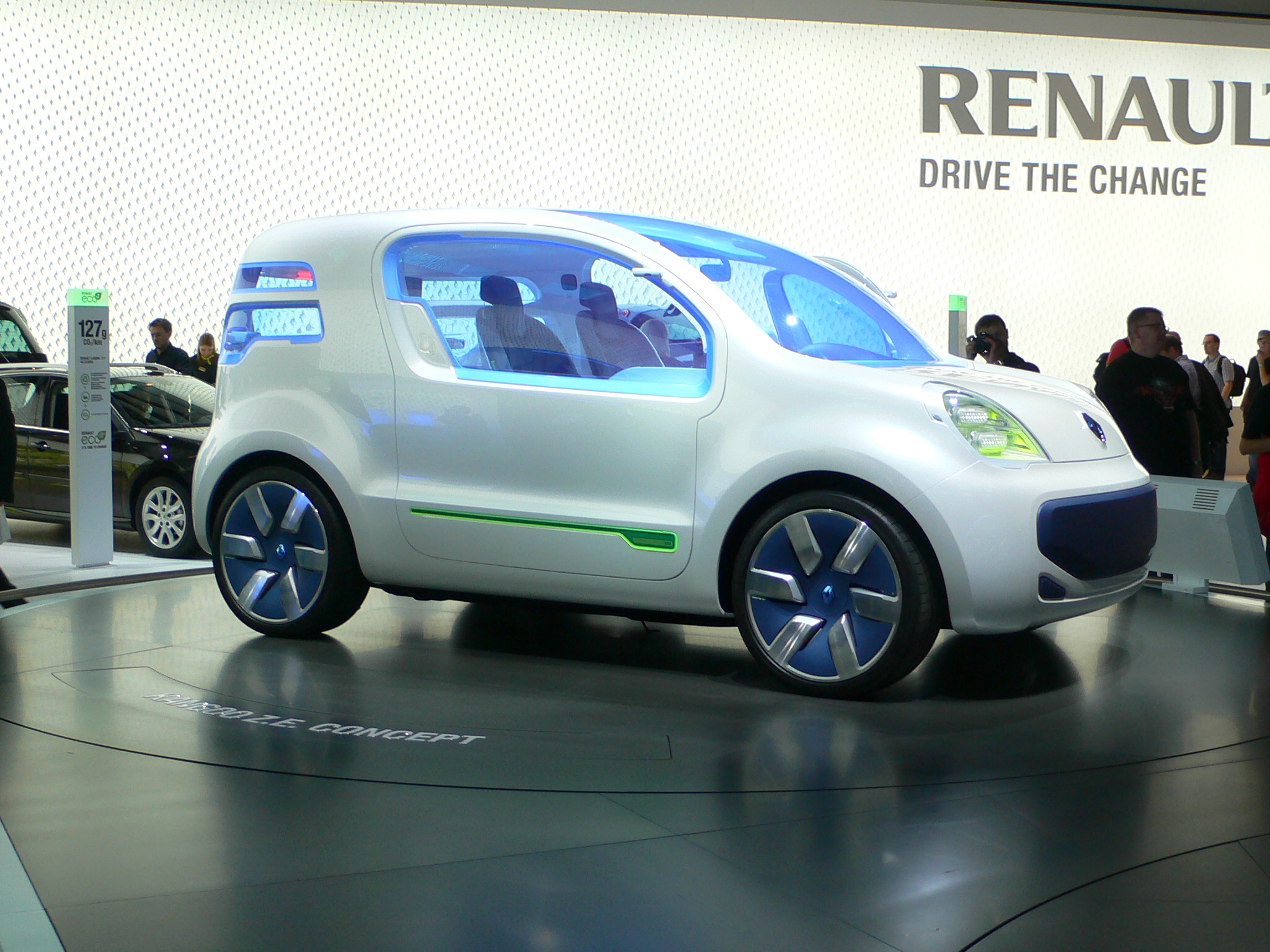
Renault Kangoo Z.E.

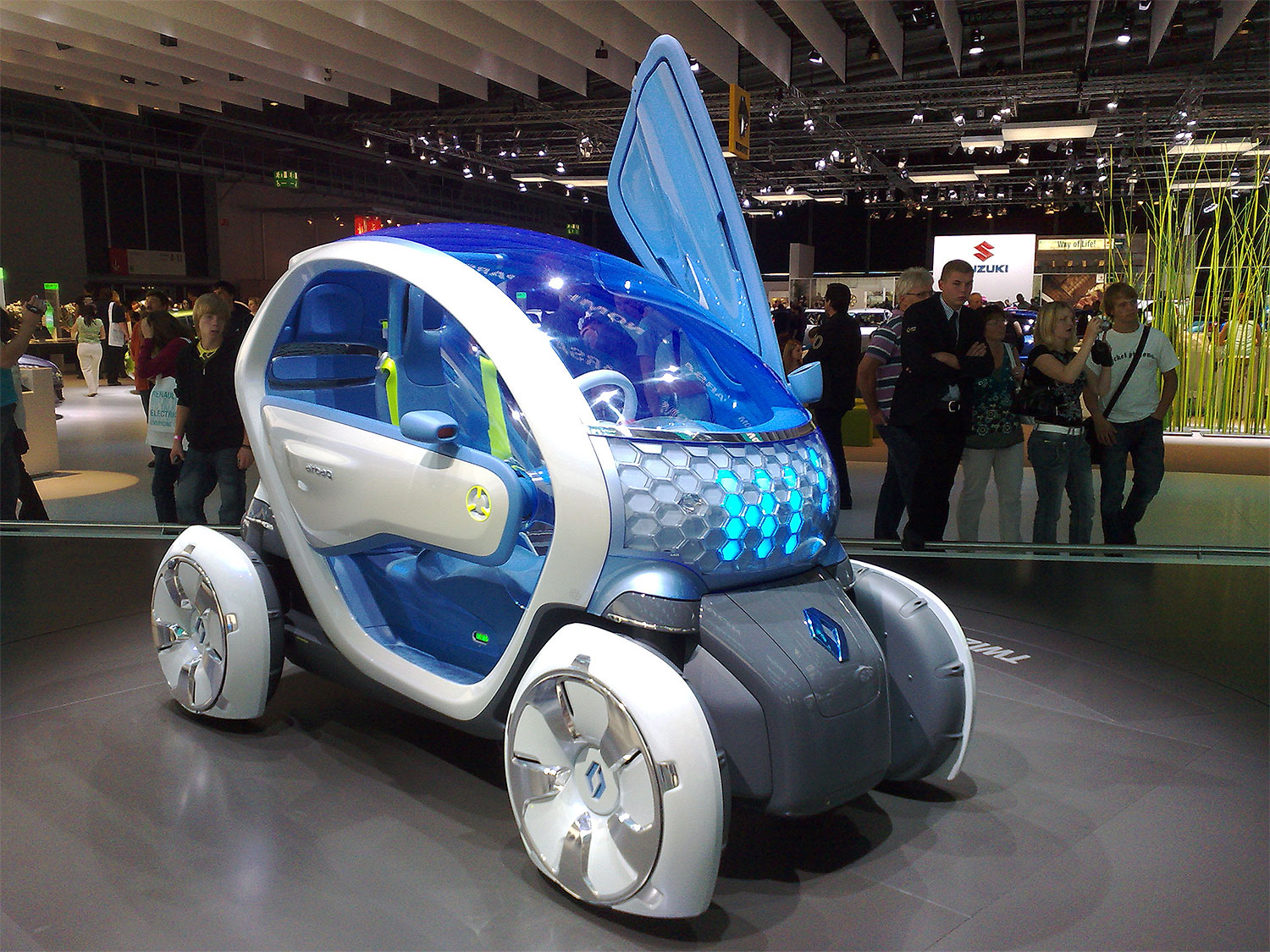
Renault Twizy Z.E.

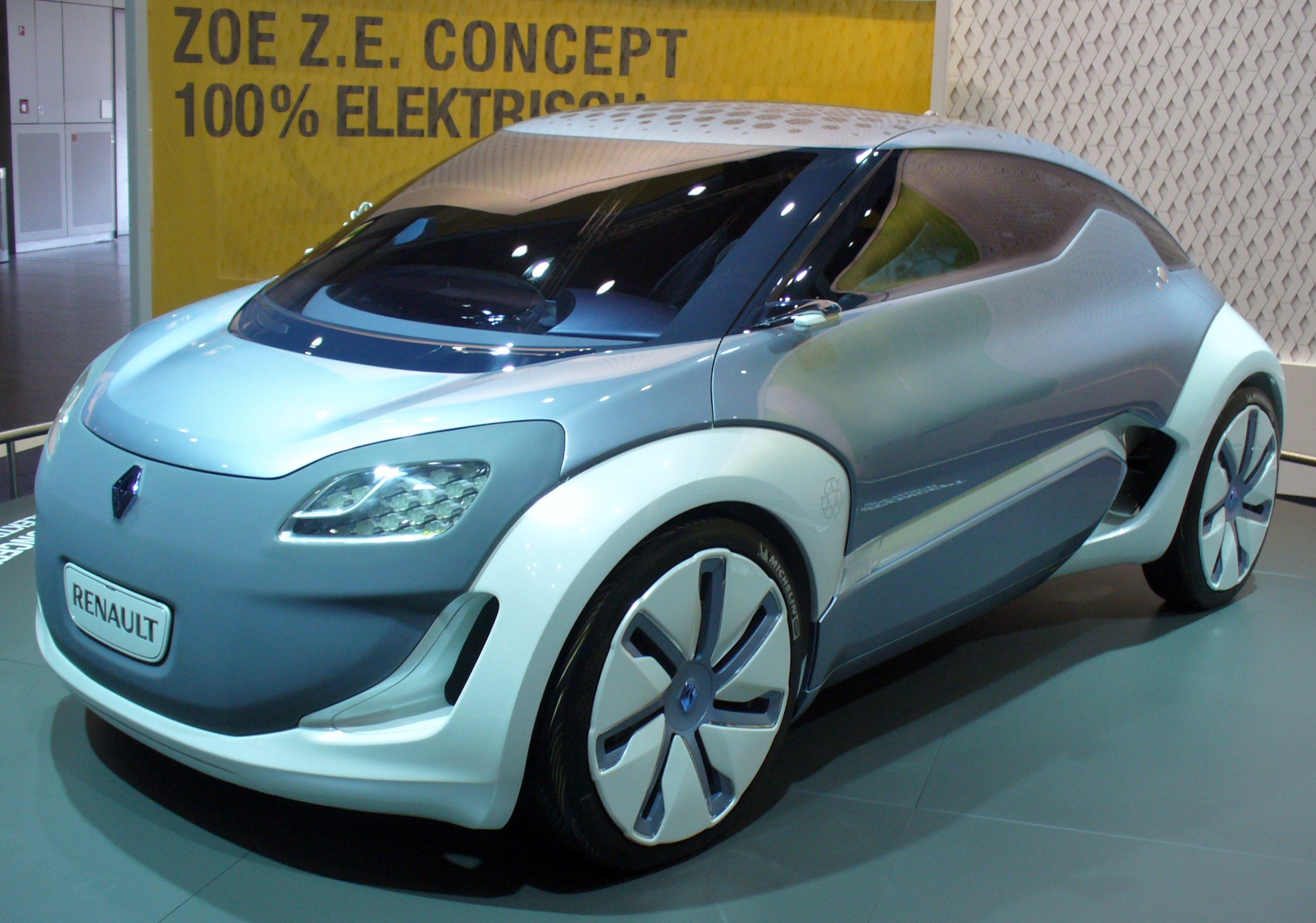
Renault Zoe Z.E.

Renault announced that cars "previewed" by all four Z.E. concept vehicles would be released from 2011 onwards and cater for a wide variety of different customers and uses.

=== 2010 Paris Motor Show ===
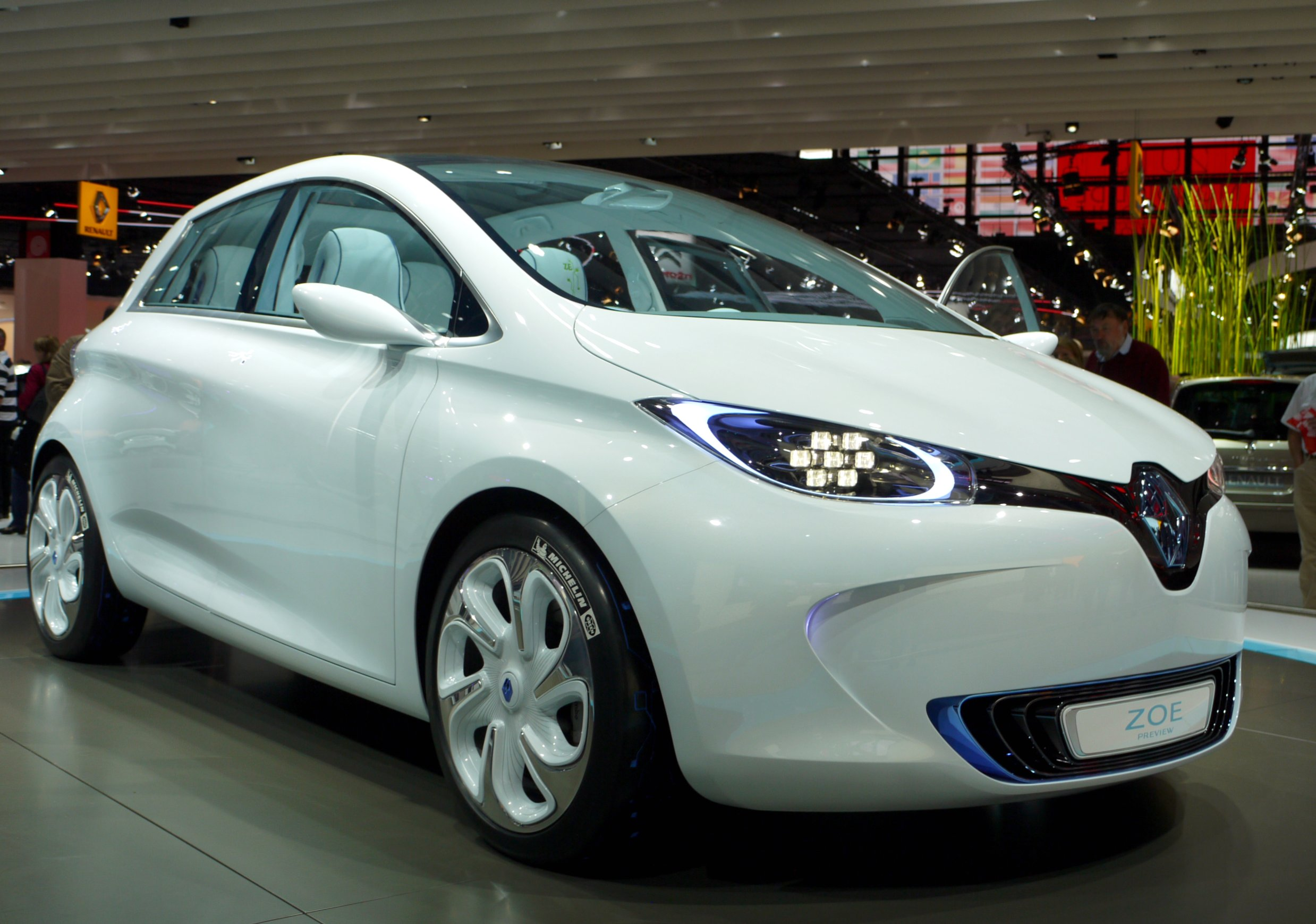

At the 2010 Paris Motor Show Renault showed the "Zoe Preview", promoting it as "a realistic glimpse of the forthcoming mass-market Renault electric car... a near-definitive representation (90 per cent) of the vehicle that will be manufactured at Renault's Flins plant, France. Its launch is scheduled for mid-2012." The show car supports the same QuickDrop battery swap capability as the Fluence Z.E., and DC fast charging.

Renault also showed several updated Twizy models and announced the Kangoo Express Z.E. van "will go on sale from mid-2011 for between €15,000 excluding VAT (with tax incentive of 5,000 euros deducted, and without options, in France) and €20,000 excluding VAT (without tax incentive, and without options), depending on the country."

== Production models ==
In 2010 Renault announced details of the first vehicles intended for production in 2011, the Fluence Z.E. and Kangoo Z.E. models. Customers in several countries can pre-reserve models at the Renault-ZE web site, although as of April 2010 it has no pricing details.

Renault announced the city car previewed by Zoé Z.E. Concept will be produced in Flins in France, and the vehicle based on Twizy. Concept will be built in Valladolid in Spain.

Renault will initially purchase batteries from AESC, the Nissan-NEC joint venture in Japan. It announced development of battery production facilities in France, Japan, Portugal, UK, and the USA.

Renault global all-electric Z.E. vehicle sales passed the 100,000 unit milestone in September 2016. The Renault Zoe is the ZE top selling model, and global sales of the electric city car achieved the 50,000 unit milestone in June 2016, including both the passenger and cargo variants.

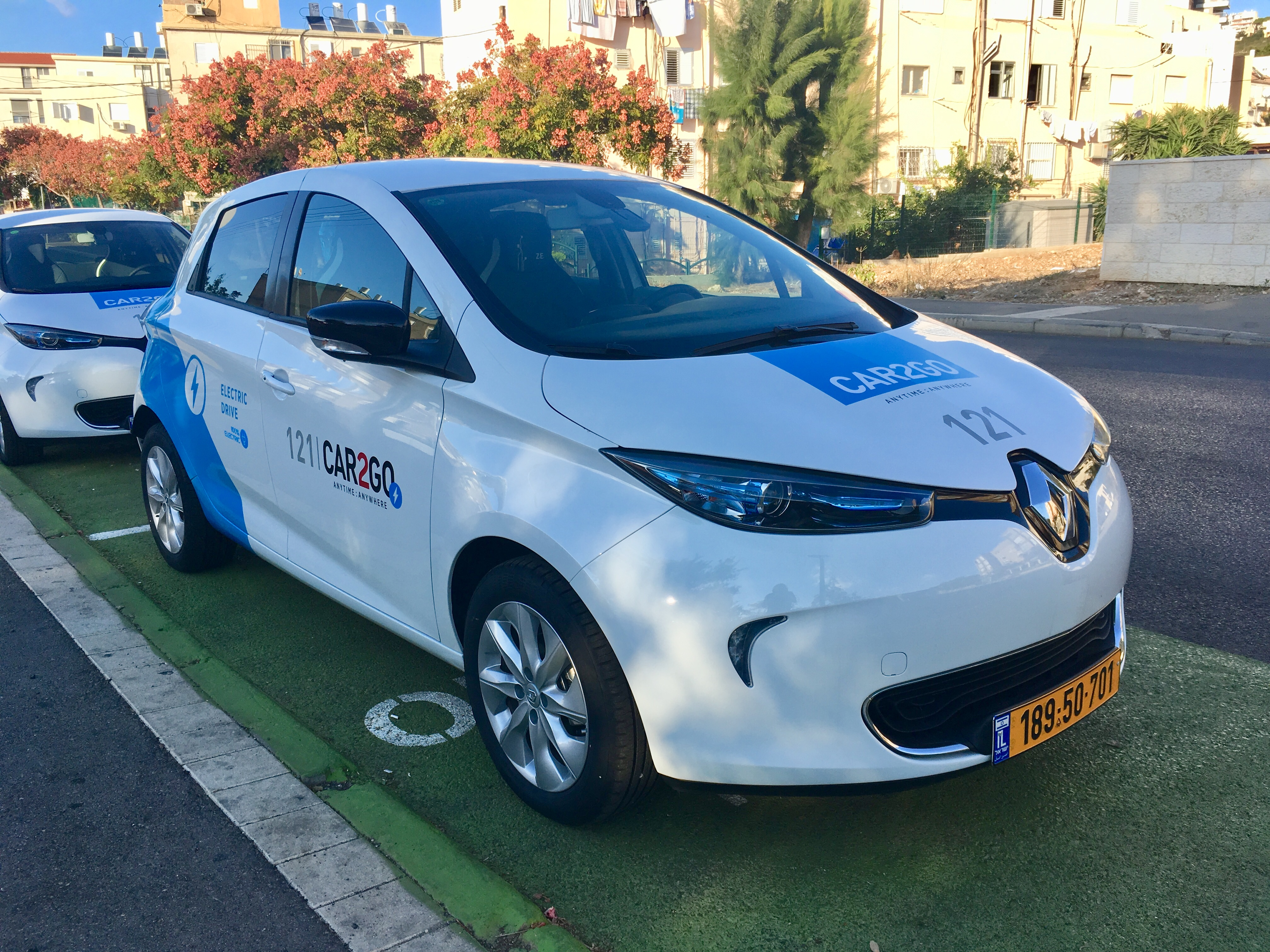
Renault Zoe, as part of a CAR2GO car-share project in Haifa, Israel

In November 2017, a new electric-car-share project was kicked off in Haifa, Israel. The project features 100 public Renault Zoe cars with its own parking spaces scattered around Haifa, operated by a smart card.

- Renault Twizy
- Renault Fluence Z.E / Renault Samsung SM3 Z.E
- Renault Kangoo Z.E
- Renault Kangoo Z.E Hydrogen
- Renault Zoe
- Renault Master Z.E
- Renault Master Z.E Hydrogen
- Renault City K-ZE
- Renault Twingo Z.E.
- Renault Trucks D Z.E.

== See also ==
- Renault EZ
- Renault Eolab
