= Renault Eolab =

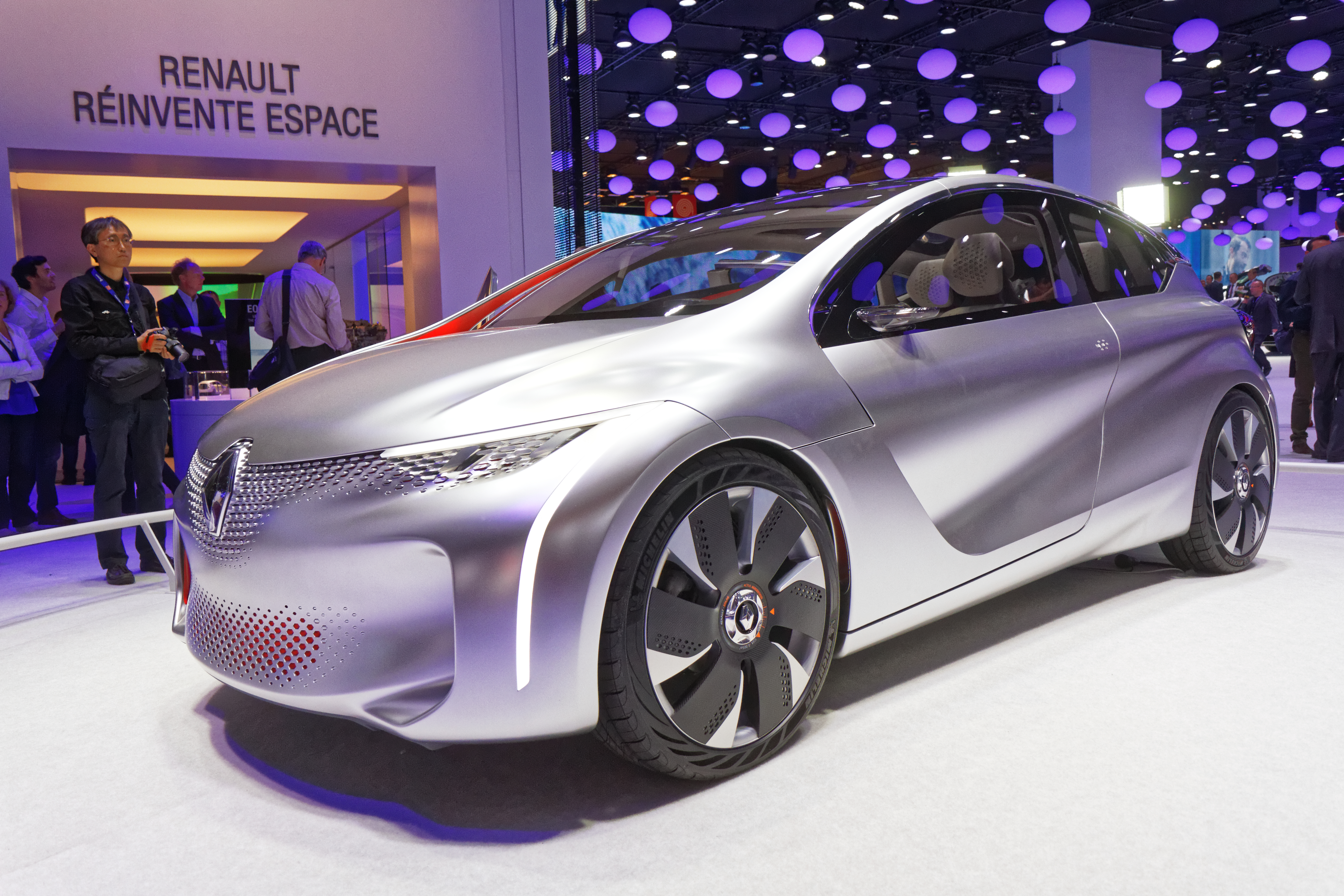

Overview
- Manufacturer: Renault
- Production: 2014 (Concept car)
- Designer: Laurens van den Acker

Body and chassis
- Class: Supermini (B)
- Body style: 5-door hatchback
- Layout: Front-engine, front-wheel-drive
- Related: Renault Clio V

Powertrain
- Engine: 1.0 L I3
- Transmission: 3-speed manual

The Renault Eolab is a concept car plug-in hybrid designed by the French car manufacturer Renault. It was unveiled to the press in September 2014, prior to its formal unveiling at the Paris Motor Show.

== Overview ==
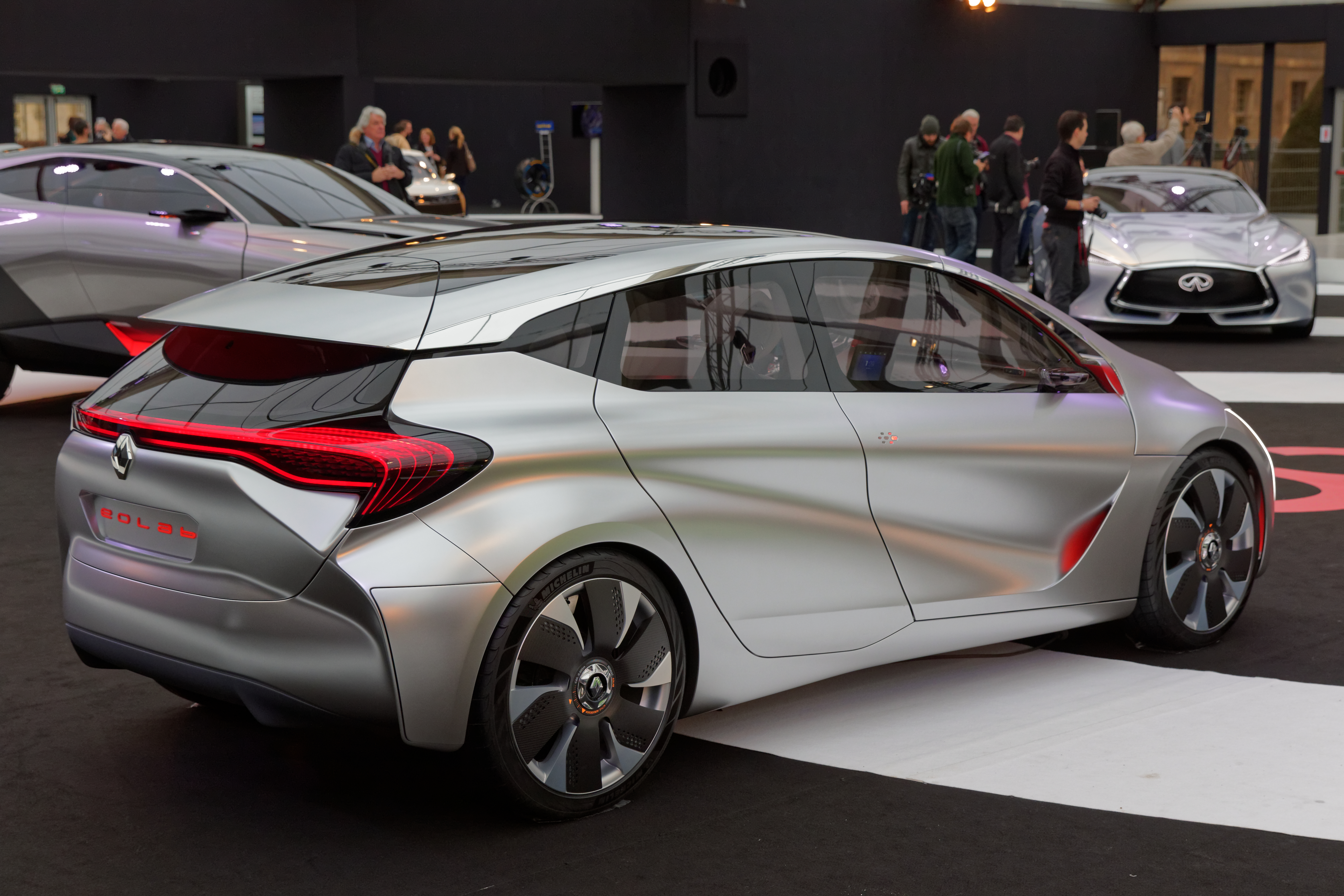
Renault Eolab concept car at the 2015 Festival automobile international.

The supermini sized Eolab hybrid demonstrates nearly 100 production-destined technological innovations, which will appear on future models by 2020. It is powered by a 1.0-litre, I3 petrol engine producing 76 PS (56 kW; 75 bhp), paired with a 54 PS (40 kW; 53 bhp) ‘axial flux discoid’ electric motor located in the clutch casing. All power is delivered to the front wheels via a three-speed gearbox. A small 6.7kWh lithium ion battery pack is attached to the system, providing 65 kilometers (40 mi) on electric power .

The Eolab features two driving modes: weekday, which emphasises low emissions, and an alternative ‘weekend’ mode uses both power units together to greater performance and range. The resulting CO_{2} emissions are a low at 22 g/km.

To keep the car's kerb weight down to 995 kg (2,194 lb), (400 kg (880 lb) less than the equivalent production Clio), the body is constructed from a combination of steel, aluminium and composites, with the roof entirely of magnesium. The car also incorporates three ride-height levels which lowers the car and reduced drag, working in conjunction with active aero on the wheel trims (on narrow 145 mm tyres) and spoilers reduce the drag coefficient to 0.235 Cd.

== See also ==
- Renault Z.E.
