= Renault Zoe =

Battery electric hatchback produced by Renault (2012–2024)

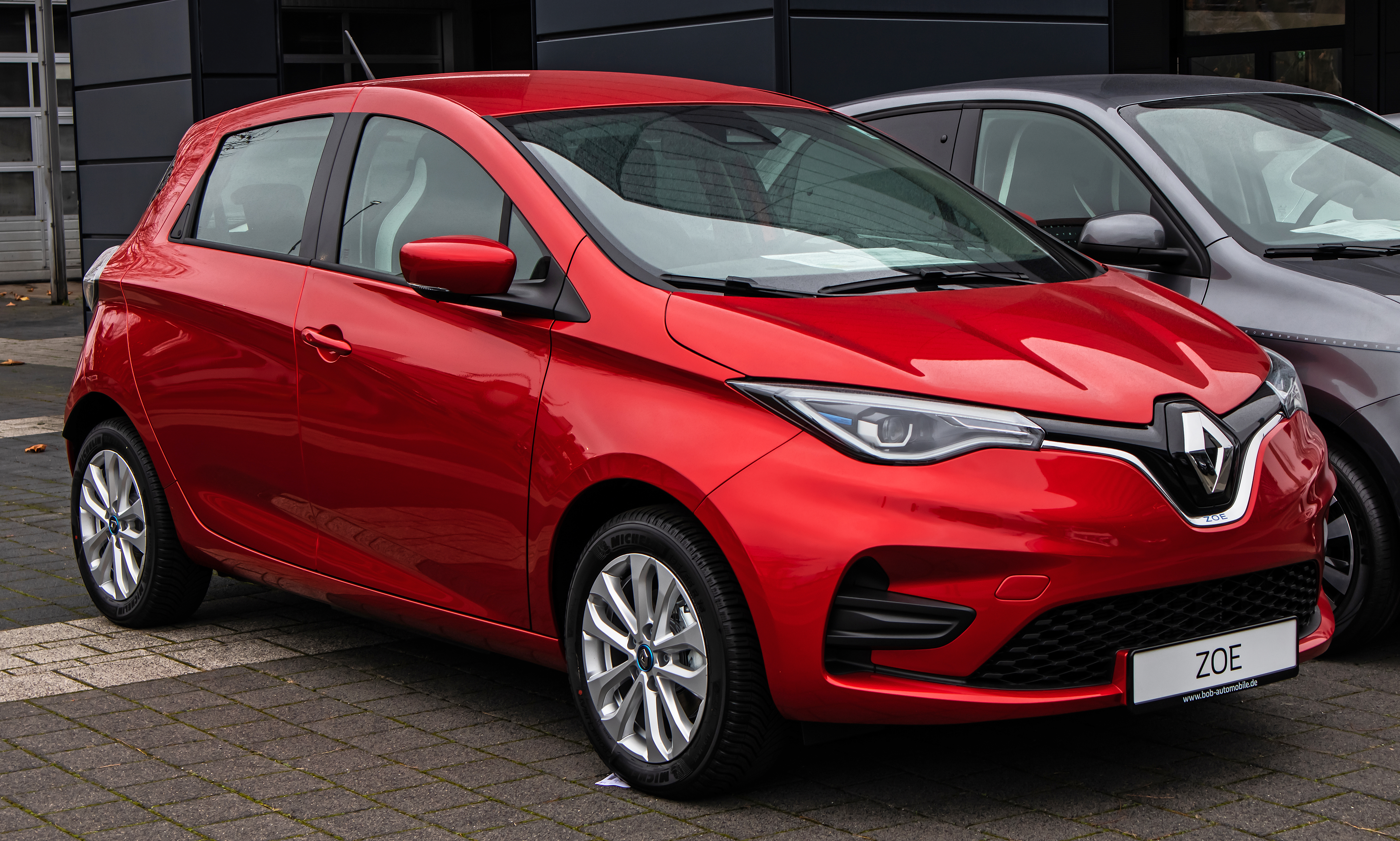
- 2020 Renault Zoe R110 Z.E. (facelift)

Overview
- Manufacturer: Renault
- Production: December 2012 – March 2024
- Assembly: France: Flins-sur-Seine (Flins Renault Factory)
- Designer: Jean Semeriva

Body and chassis
- Class: Supermini (B)
- Body style: 5-door hatchback
- Layout: Front-motor, front-wheel-drive
- Platform: Renault–Nissan B platform

Powertrain
- Electric motor: Synchronous with rotor coil motor: 66 kW (90 PS; 89 bhp) 220 N⋅m (162 lb⋅ft) (Q90/R90) (2012–2019); 80 kW (109 PS; 107 bhp) 225 N⋅m (166 lb⋅ft) (R110) (2018–2024); 100 kW (136 PS; 134 bhp) 245 N⋅m (181 lb⋅ft) (R135) (2019–2024)
- Battery: 22 kW·h lithium ion battery (2012–2019); 41 kW·h lithium ion battery October 2016–September 2019); 52 kW·h lithium ion battery (September 2019–2024)
- Range: 210 km (130 mi) (NEDC) (2012–June 2015); 240 km (150 mi) (NEDC) June 2015–October 2016; 300 km (190 mi) (WLTP) / 400 km (250 mi) (NEDC) October 2016–September 2019; 395 km (245 mi) (WLTP) September 2019–2024
- Plug-in charging: max 43kW or max 22kW on Type 2 (2012–2019); max 50kW on CCS and max 22kW on Type 2 (2019–2024)

Dimensions
- Wheelbase: 2,588 mm (101.9 in)
- Length: 4,084 mm (160.8 in)
- Width: 1,730 mm (68.1 in)
- Height: 1,562 mm (61.5 in)
- Kerb weight: 1,468 kg (3,236 lb)

Chronology
- Successor: Renault 5 E-Tech

The Renault Zoe (stylized ZOE), known as Renault Zoe E-Tech Electric since 2021, is a five-door supermini electric car produced by the French manufacturer Renault. Renault originally unveiled, under the Zoe name, a number of different concept cars. Initially in 2005 as the Zoe City Car and later as the Zoe Z.E. electric concept was shown in two different versions in 2009 and 2010 under the Renault Z.E. name. A production ready version of the Zoe was shown at the 2012 Geneva Motor Show. The Renault Zoe is based on the platform of the Renault Clio.

Retail customer deliveries began in France in December 2012, followed in 2013 by several European countries. Since 2013, the Zoe has been the all-time top selling all-electric car in the French market, with more than 100,000 units registered through June 2020. The Zoe was the top selling all-electric car in Europe for two years running, 2015 and 2016, and also topped European sales in the broader plug-in electric car segment in 2016 and 2020. As of 2020, the Zoe ranks as Europe's all-time best selling plug-in electric car. As of December 2020, global sales totaled almost 285,000 units since inception.

The first production Zoe had a 22 kWh lithium-ion battery pack that delivers a range between 210 km (130 mi) and 240 km (150 mi) under the NEDC cycle. In September 2016, Renault announced the introduction of new higher range model with a 41 kWh lithium-ion battery, increasing the range to 400 km (250 mi) under the NEDC cycle. In mid 2018 a new model with increased motor power of 80 kW (110 hp), was announced as the ZE 40 R110. In mid 2019, the ZE 50 R135 was announced, with a 55 kWh battery pack (52 usable) and 100 kW (130 hp) motor, and CCS charging; the final production-ready model was shown at the Frankfurt Motor Show and deliveries started end of 2019.

Renault ceased production of the electric 5-door hatchback on 30 March 2024, after nearly twelve years. It was replaced by the retro-styled Renault 5 E-Tech.

== Concepts ==
=== Zoe City Car Concept (2005) ===
The Renault Zoe City Car concept (or Z17) was shown at the 2005 Geneva Motor Show featuring 3 seats, the 3.45 m long open top vehicle was proposed as an urban focused car. This Zoe had no connection with the later electric Zoe concept to follow four years later.

=== Zoe Concept (2009) ===
The Renault Zoe Concept was shown to the public in 2009 at the Frankfurt Motor Show to show the company's vision for a Clio sized electric car. It was powered by a 71 kW (95 hp) electric motor (mounted at the front) and lithium-ion batteries (under the seats). It was estimated it would have a range of 160 kilometres (99 mi) and a top speed of 145 km/h (90 mph), and could be charged at a conventional 230 V socket, or fast-charged from a high-voltage supply to 80 percent in only 20 minutes. A third innovative option was to swap the batteries for a new pack at a Renault Quickdrop centre. The vehicle was designed by Raphaël Linari.

The design was tear-drop shaped featuring a see-through roof features solar panels which run the air-conditioning system and gull-wing doors. A new climate control system was also shown, developed with L'Oréal, which could spray essential oils into the interior to cut out harmful exterior smells, or rehydrate the interior to prevent skin drying out.

=== Zoe Preview (2010) ===
The Zoe Preview, a substantially revised version of the Zoe concept, was shown to the public at the 2010 Paris Motor Show, and was claimed to be a near-definitive representation (90% showroom ready) of the final version of the car. Many of the existing design features of the 2009 concept model were discarded such as the gull-wing doors.

The technical specifications had changed from the 2009 version with the power of the electric motor reduced to 66 kW (89 hp), a reduced top speed of 145 km/h (90 mph), but still with a 160 kilometres (99 mi) range. It was suggested that the Zoe ZE would be priced from €15,000.

=== Zoe E-Sport (2017) ===
The Zoe E-sport is a hot hatch electric car concept unveiled at the 2017 Geneva Motor Show. It has an all-wheel drive design with two electric motors, each one powering an axle. The combined power from both is 340 kW (456 bhp) and the torque 640 N⋅m (472 lbf⋅ft). The lithium-ion battery package weighs 450 kg (992 lb) and is on the rear. The car, weighing 1,450 kg (3,197 lb), has a carbon fibre chassis, racing brakes and equipment, and a double wishbone suspension on both axles.

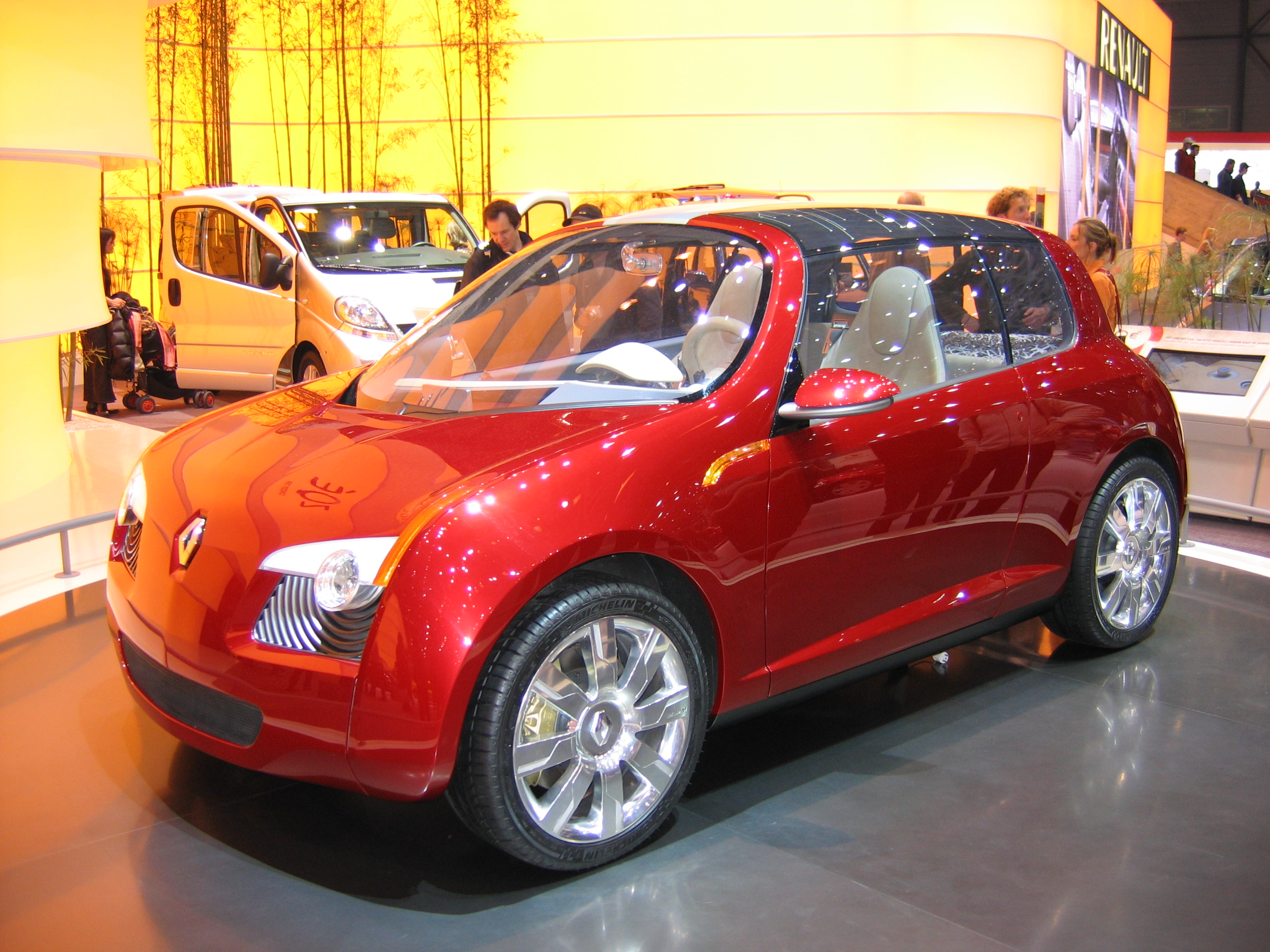
Renault Zoe City Car 2005

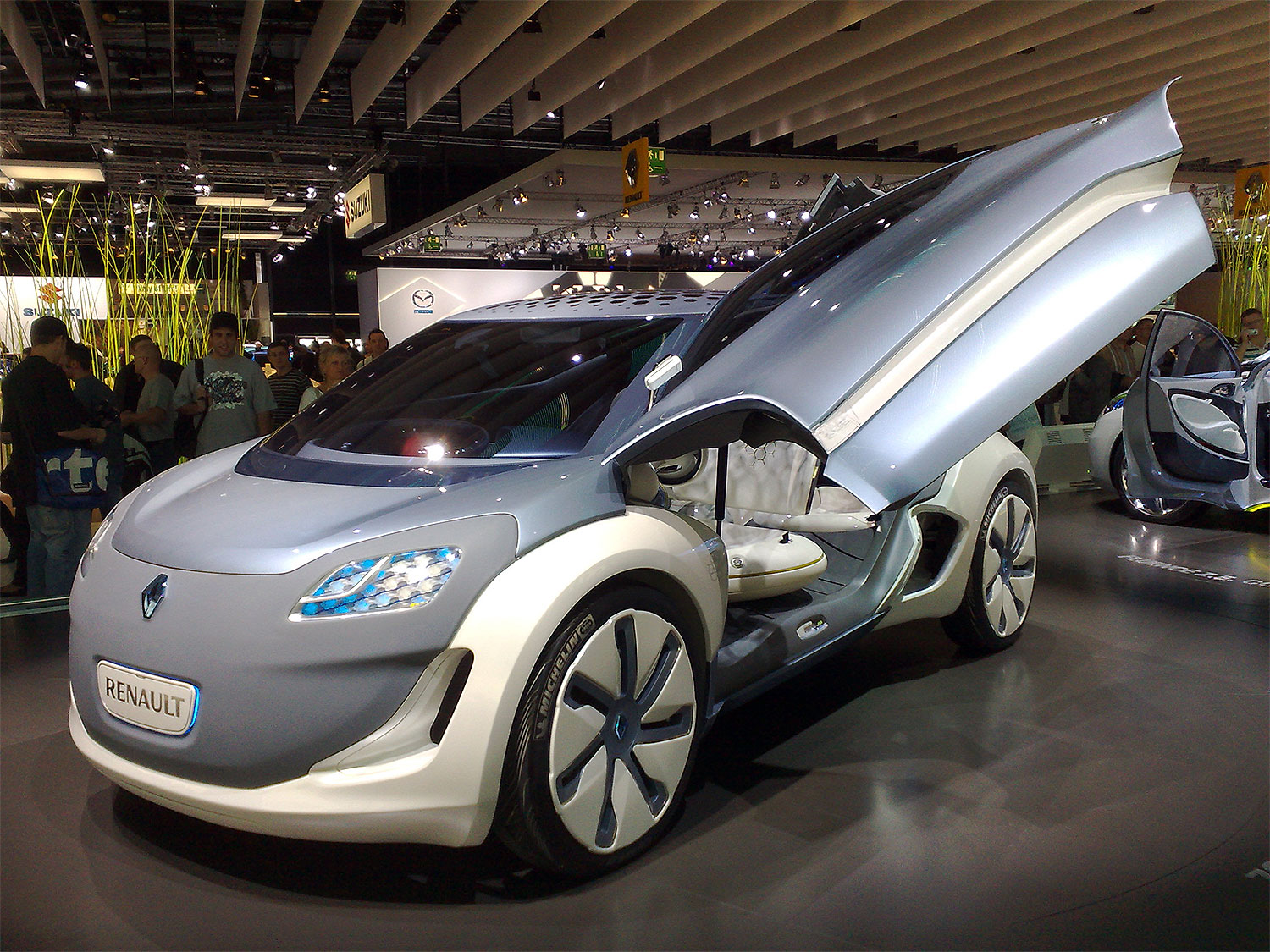
Renault Zoe Z.E. Concept 2009

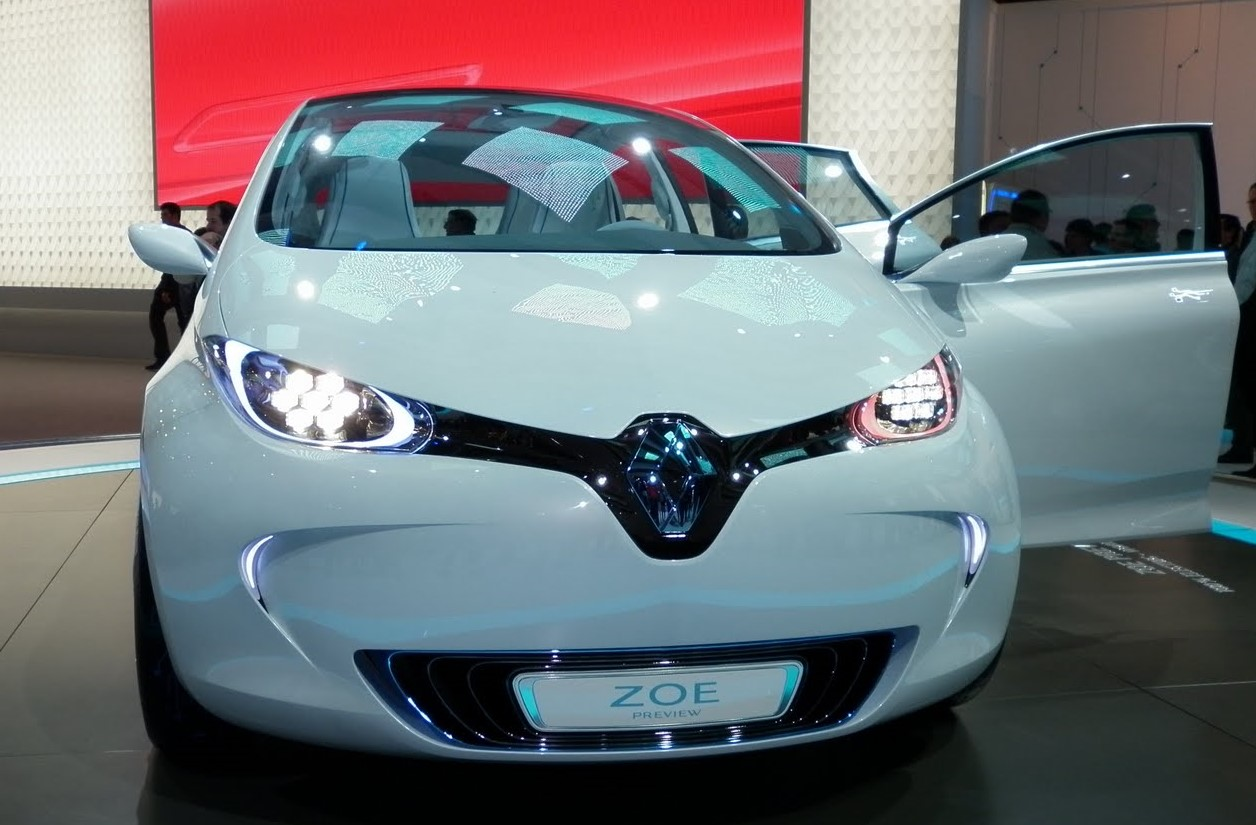
Renault Zoe Preview 2010

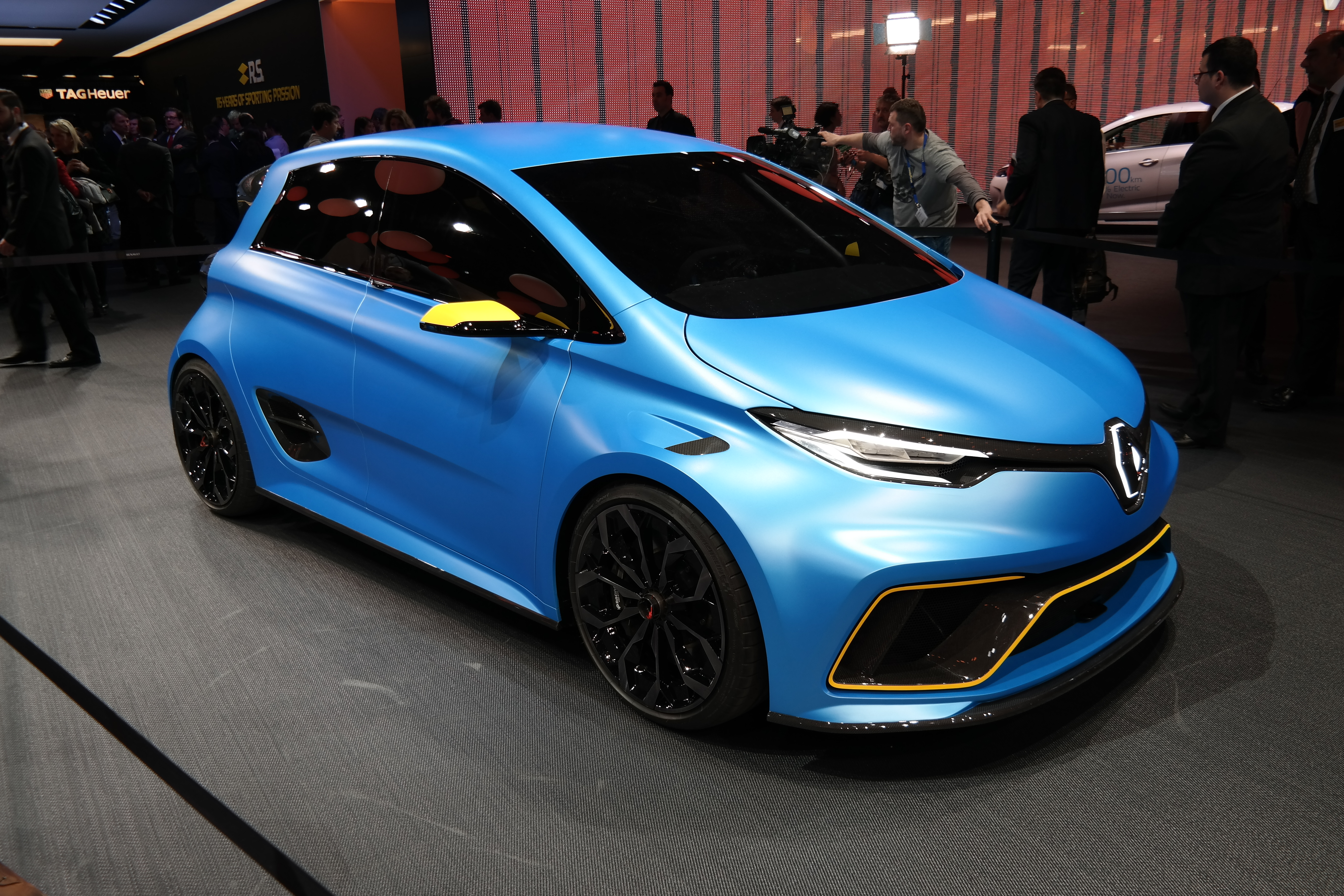
Renault Zoe E-Sport 2017

== Production versions ==
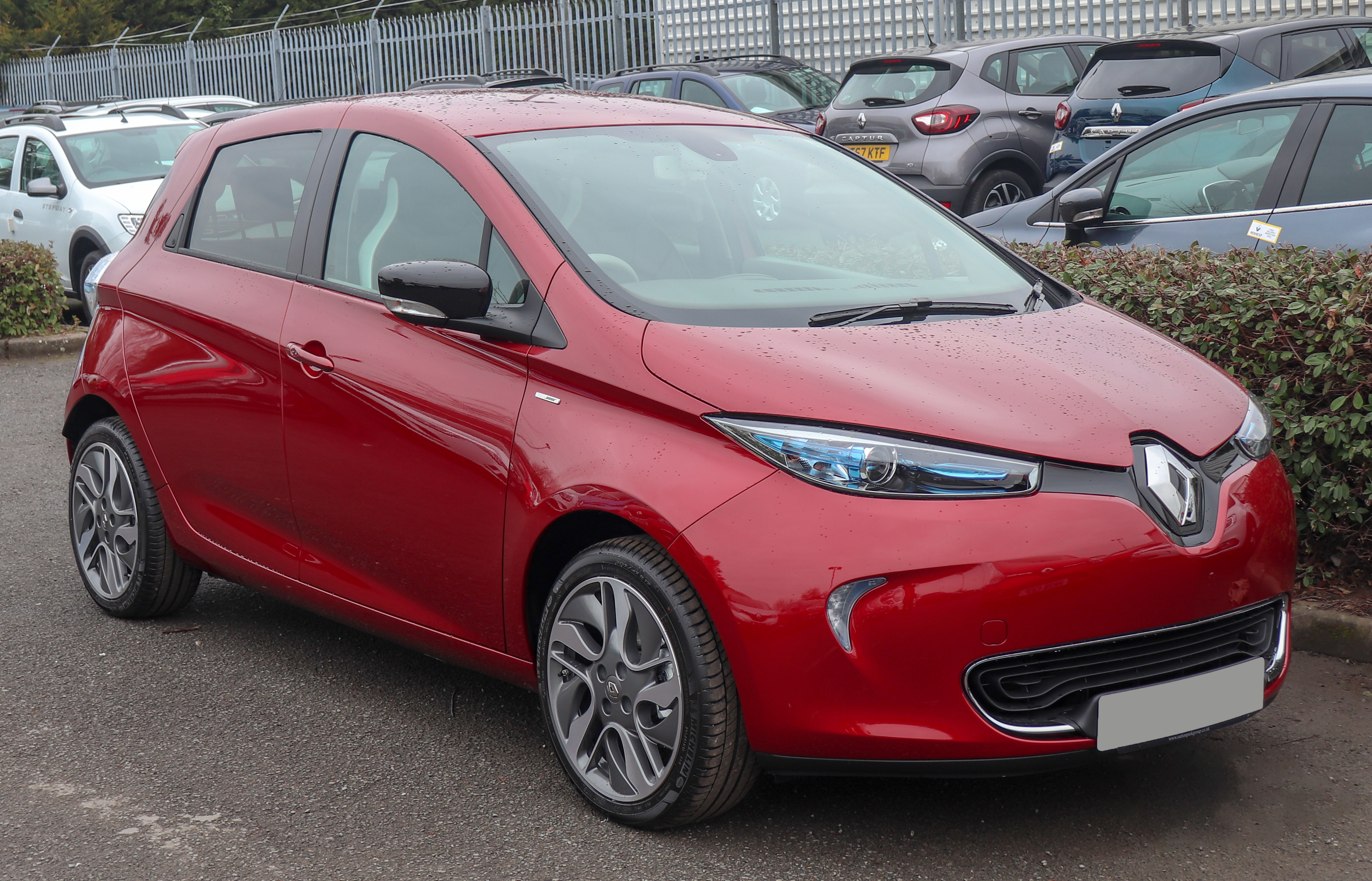

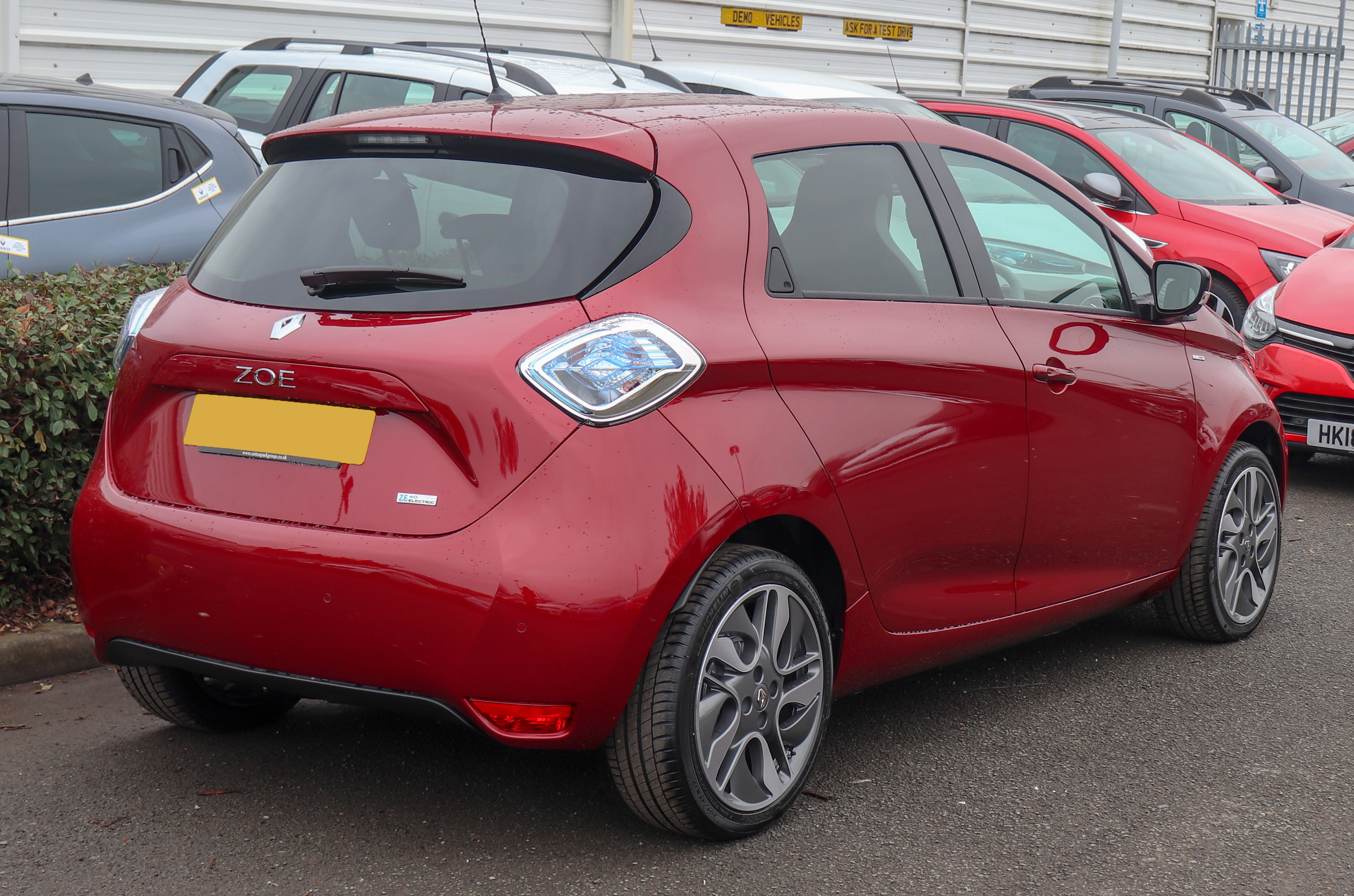
Renault Zoe (ZE 40) Dynamique in Mars Red

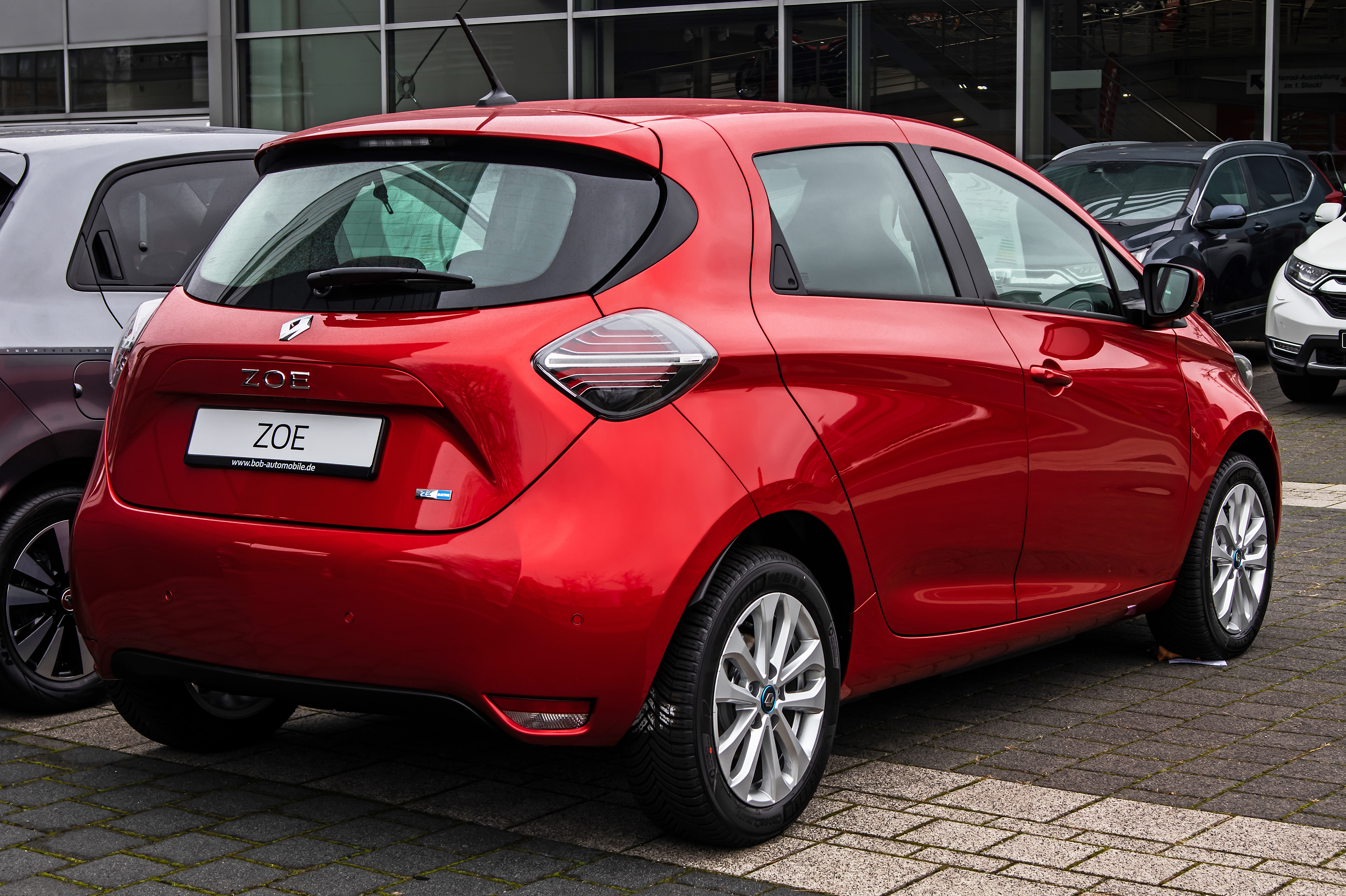
Rear (facelift)

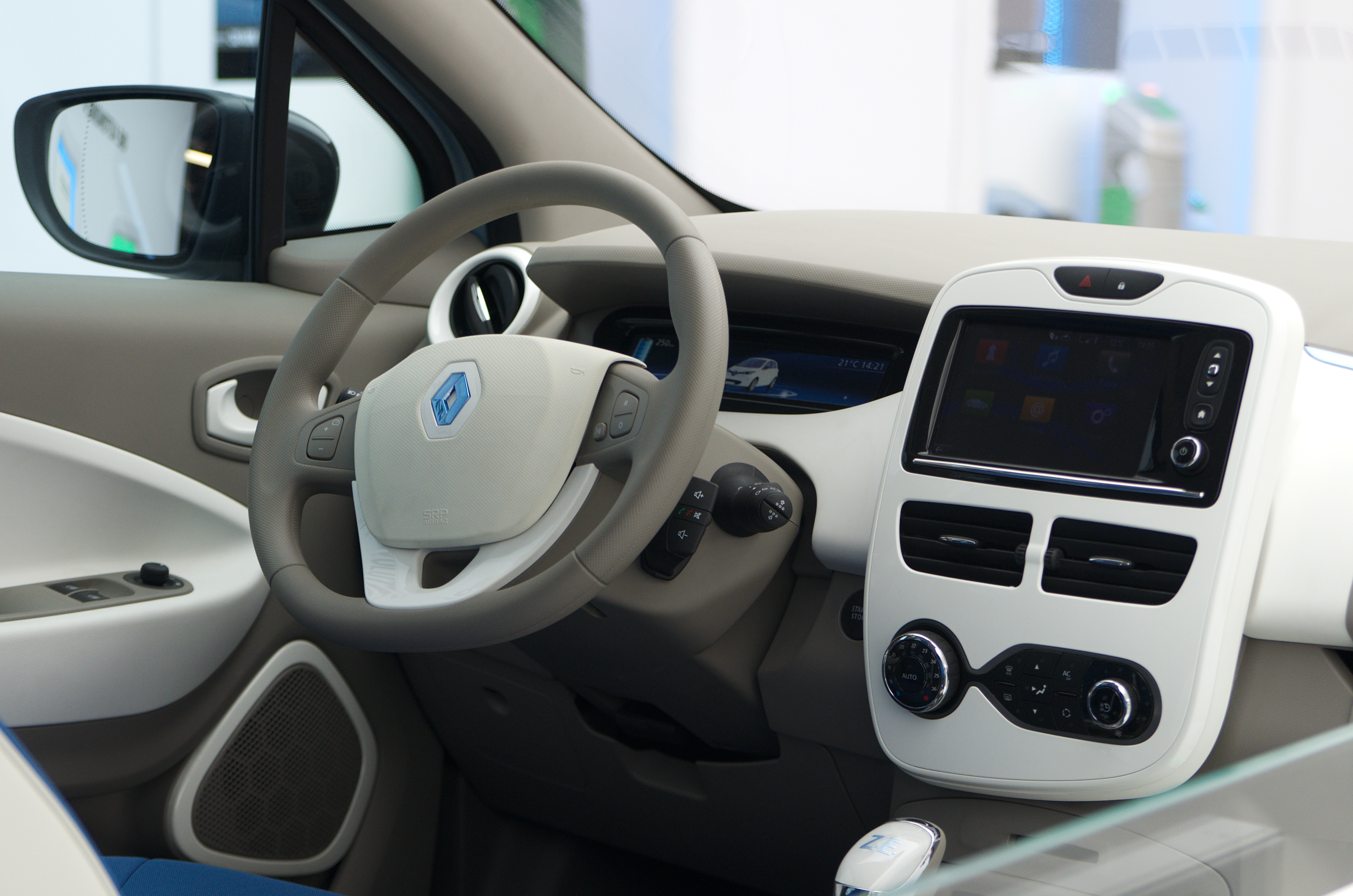
Interior (pre-facelift)

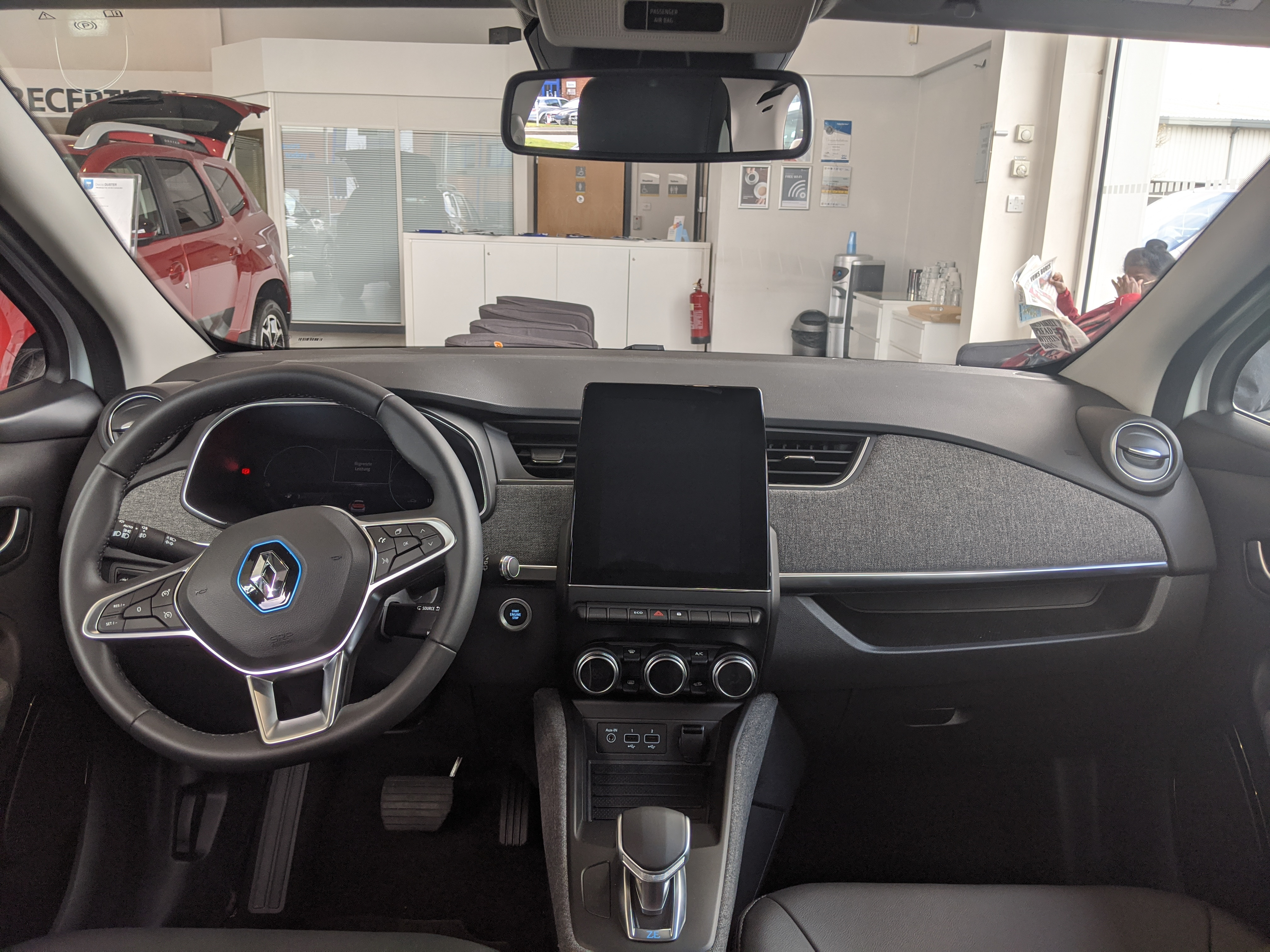
Interior (facelift)

=== ZE ===
The production version of the Zoe was announced in March 2012 at the Geneva Motor Show. Similar to the Zoe Preview of 2010 and the design credited to Jean Semeriva, it is a five-door supermini at 4080 mm long, a little longer than the Renault Clio. Retail customer deliveries began in limited number in France in December 2012, and Renault planned to increase availability during the first quarter of 2013. The first Zoe was delivered to Arnaud Montebourg, French Minister of Industrial Recovery. The Zoe is produced at Flins on the same assembly line as the Renault Clio and Nissan Micra. About 170 Zoes are made per day.

In France the Zoe pricing starts at €20,700 (US$27,250) before applying the existing €6,300 (US$8,300) tax incentive, plus a monthly fee for the battery. The cost of leasing the battery for 36 months starts from €79/month (US$104/month) for an annual distance travelled of 12,500 km (7,800 mi) and includes comprehensive breakdown assistance.

The Zoes produced until June 2015 are powered by a 22 kWh lithium-ion battery pack weighing 275 kg, driving a 65 kW (87 bhp; 88 PS) synchronous electric motor supplied by Continental and called the Q210, as the NEDC cycle range is 210 km (130 mi). Maximum torque is 220 N·m (162 lb-ft) with a top speed of 135 km/h (84 mph). Renault estimates that in suburban use, the Zoe can achieve around 100 km (62 mi) in cold weather and 150 km (93 mi) in temperate conditions. The car features a charging system called "Caméléon" (Chameleon) charger that allows the Zoe to be charged at any level of AC power up to 43 kW (63A), taking between 30 minutes and nine hours. The particular type of grid system in parts of Norway with a different potential for the protective ground requires a special charger, which is included with all Zoes in Norway from summer 2015.

In June 2015, Renault announced the introduction of a new, smaller electric motor called the R240, manufactured at its Cléon engine plant. The new motor has the same power and torque as the Q210 unit with an extended NEDC cycle range of 240 km (150 mi). However, the Q210 would still be available as the R240 allowed only 22 kW quick charging.

=== ZE 40 ===
In October 2016 at the Paris Motor Show, Renault unveiled a 41 kWh lithium-ion battery called the ZE 40, weighing 300 kg (661 lb). The battery was developed by Renault and LG Chem, and is assembled at Renault's Flins plant. It is mounted on Zoes using the R75/90 motor (formerly R240, the name now making reference to the motor power output range between 55 kW (75 PS) and 66 kW (90 PS)) and increases the car range to 400 km (250 mi) under NEDC and allows quick charging. The Q210 would still be available, renamed as Q90. According to Renault, the battery delivers about 300 km (190 mi) on real driving conditions. Older Zoes using the battery would get a less significant range increase because of various design upgrades. Options to buy the battery would be available, along with revised lease plans.

== Facelift ==
=== ZE 50 ===
In June 2019 Renault announced a new Zoe with a 52 kWh battery, just as the ZE 40 this was also developed by Renault and LG Chem, achieving range of 385 km (239 mi) under WLTP conditions. It comes with either an 80 kW R110 electric motor for the "Iconic" trim level, or a 100 kW R135 electric motor for the "S Edition" and "GT Line +" trim levels. It also has faster charging, with the option to add 50 kW DC capability via CCS2.

In mid-2022, the Zoe received some mild updates.

== Electrics and Drivetrain variants ==
=== Battery ===
	First generation	Second generation	Third generation
Total capacity	25.92 kWh (22 kWh usable)	45.61 kWh (41 kWh usable)	55 kWh (52 kWh usable)
Cells	192 cells 36 Ah nominal capacity 3.75 V nominal voltage 860 gram	192 cells 63.35 Ah nominal capacity 3.75 V nominal voltage 940 gram	192 cells 78 Ah nominal capacity 3.65 V nominal voltage 1073 gram
Pack weight	280 kg	305 kg	326 kg
Thermals	air cooled	air cooled	air cooled

==== Buying options ====
In France, pricing of the Zoe with the 41 kWh battery starts at €23,600 (~ US$26,460) before any applicable government incentives (€6,300 or US$8,300), and without the purchase of the battery. The rental fee for the battery is €69 (~ US$77) per month for up to 7,500 km (4,700 mi) per year and €119 (~ US$133) per month for unlimited mileage. In Norway, pricing starts at 229,400 kroner (~ US$28,760), and the pricing of the variant with the original 22 kWh battery starts at 40,000 kroner (~ US$5,000) less than the 41 kWh variant. The small battery can be upgraded to the newer one, at a cost of around 3500 Euros for rented batteries.

In the UK, it has been possible to buy the Zoe with the battery, or lease the battery. Leasing the battery gives a free replacement if capacity falls under 80%.

=== Charger ===
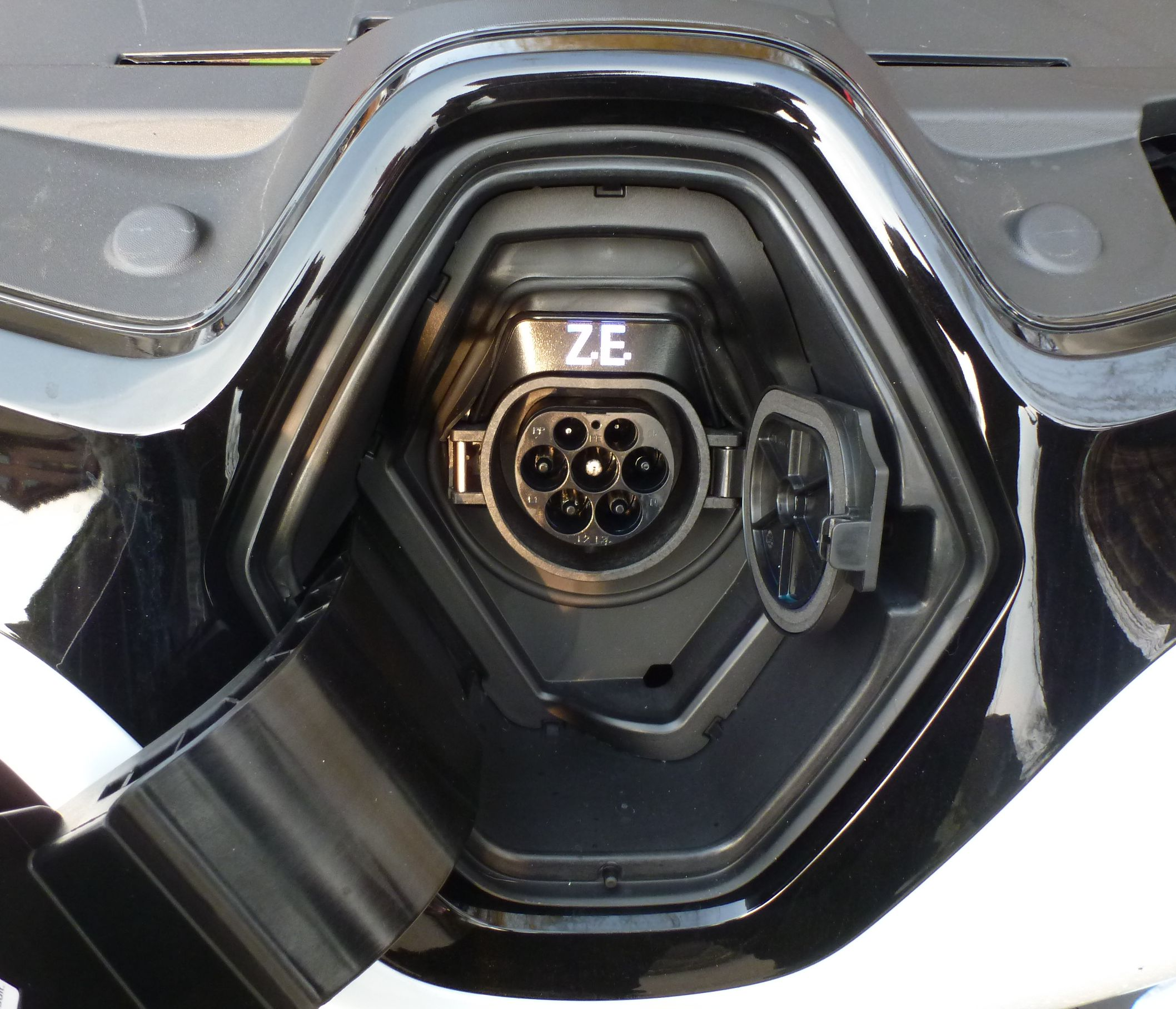
Charging port in the "nose" of the Zoe, for many years AC-only Type2 as DC CCS2 was introduced in some models in 2019

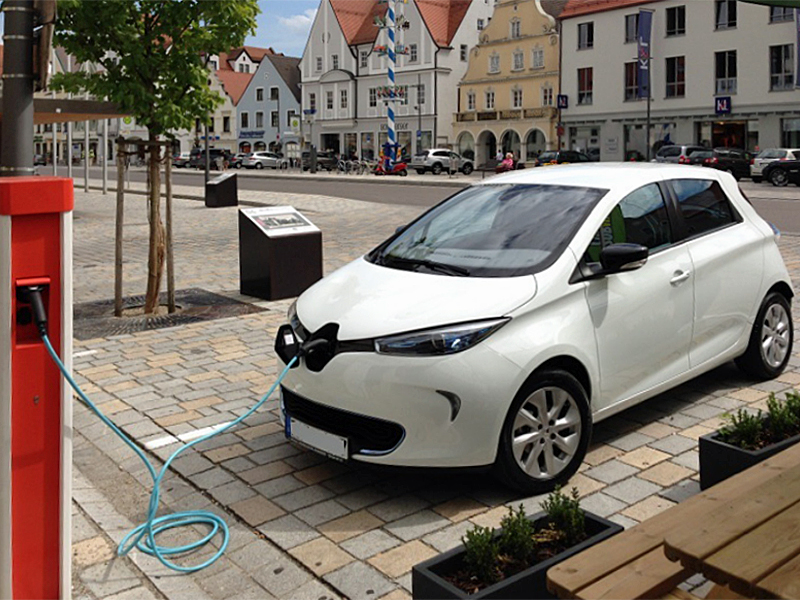
Plugged in Renault Zoe

Renault Zoe uses 'Chameleon' onboard charger, that repurposes motor power electronics to charge the battery. Motor windings are used as power inductor for boost (single phase power) or buck (3 phase power) converter. This system saves on number of components, but it has several downsides:

There is no galvanic isolation between the grid and the battery. Because of this, Zoe has very strict HV fault and ground tests and will not charge if ground-neutral resistance is more 100 ohm. To perform this test, Zoe injects 20mA pulse between ground and neutral, and might trip some RCDs.

At the input side, it has a bridge rectifier with 3 inputs for 3 phases. When it does 1 phase charging, it uses internal 35A relay to connect the Neutral with L3. Decision if there are 3 phases or not is based on whether there is voltage difference between L1, L2 and L3. If there is a wrongly wired power supply, where all 3 phases are connected to the same phase (no.voltage difference between phases), it would try to charge in single phase mode, which can damage the relay. This damage can be confirmed by multi-meter by checking if there is continuity between L3 and N pins at the charge port. Note, that facelifted models have 50A fuses inside charge port cable harness, so they must be checked first.

The 2015 R240 version removed the 43 kW AC charging capability, in exchange for better efficiency of low power home charging. The 2017 facelift still allowed for a Q90 rapid charge option (full-speed 43 kW rapid charging).

=== Motor ===
In February 2018, Renault introduced an updated version of the R90 motor, the R110, which upped power output to 80 kW (110 PS) while maintaining the same estimated economy and similar torque (225 N⋅m (166 lb⋅ft)). The R90 would still be available for sale. The price for cars equipped with the new motor would be slightly higher than those using the R90 version. The R110 will be the first Renault motor certified under WLTP and sales would start by the end of the 2018 summer in Europe.

In 2019, Renault introduced the R135 motor (100 kW) in the ZE 50.

== Safety ==
The Zoe in its standard European market configuration received a five-star Euro NCAP 2013-rating. The score was:

Euro NCAP test results* Renault Zoe (2013)
Test	Points	%
Overall:	5 /5 stars	
Adult occupant:	32	89%
Child occupant:	39	80%
Pedestrian:	24	66%
Safety assist:	8	85%

In 2021, the updated Zoe in its standard European market configuration received a zero-star safety rating, becoming the third car in Euro NCAP's history to record a zero-star rating. The score was:

Euro NCAP test results Renault Zoe (2021)
Test	Points	%
Overall:	0 /5 stars	
Adult occupant:	16	43%
Child occupant:	25	52%
Pedestrian:	22	41%
Safety assist:	2	14%

According to the investigation, the violent explosion in a garage in Neuss on 27 August 2023 was caused by a parked Renault Zoe electric car. A defect in the car's battery caused a fire and gas escaping from the battery led to the explosion, the Neuss police said. Investigations by the criminal police and an expert have meanwhile been able to rule out other causes, it said. The explosion had caused considerable damage in the residential area. Several neighbouring garages were destroyed and residential buildings damaged.

== Sales and markets ==
Retail customer deliveries began in limited numbers in France in December 2012, and availability was increased during the first quarter of 2013. A total of 48 units were registered in France during December 2012, and cumulative sales reached 5,559 units through December 2013. The Zoe became the top selling all-electric vehicle in the country in January 2013, and kept the monthly lead through December 2013, representing 62.8% of electric car sales in the country during 2013. In addition, the Zoe became the best selling electric car in France accounting for registrations in the electric passenger car segment since 2010 through December 2013.

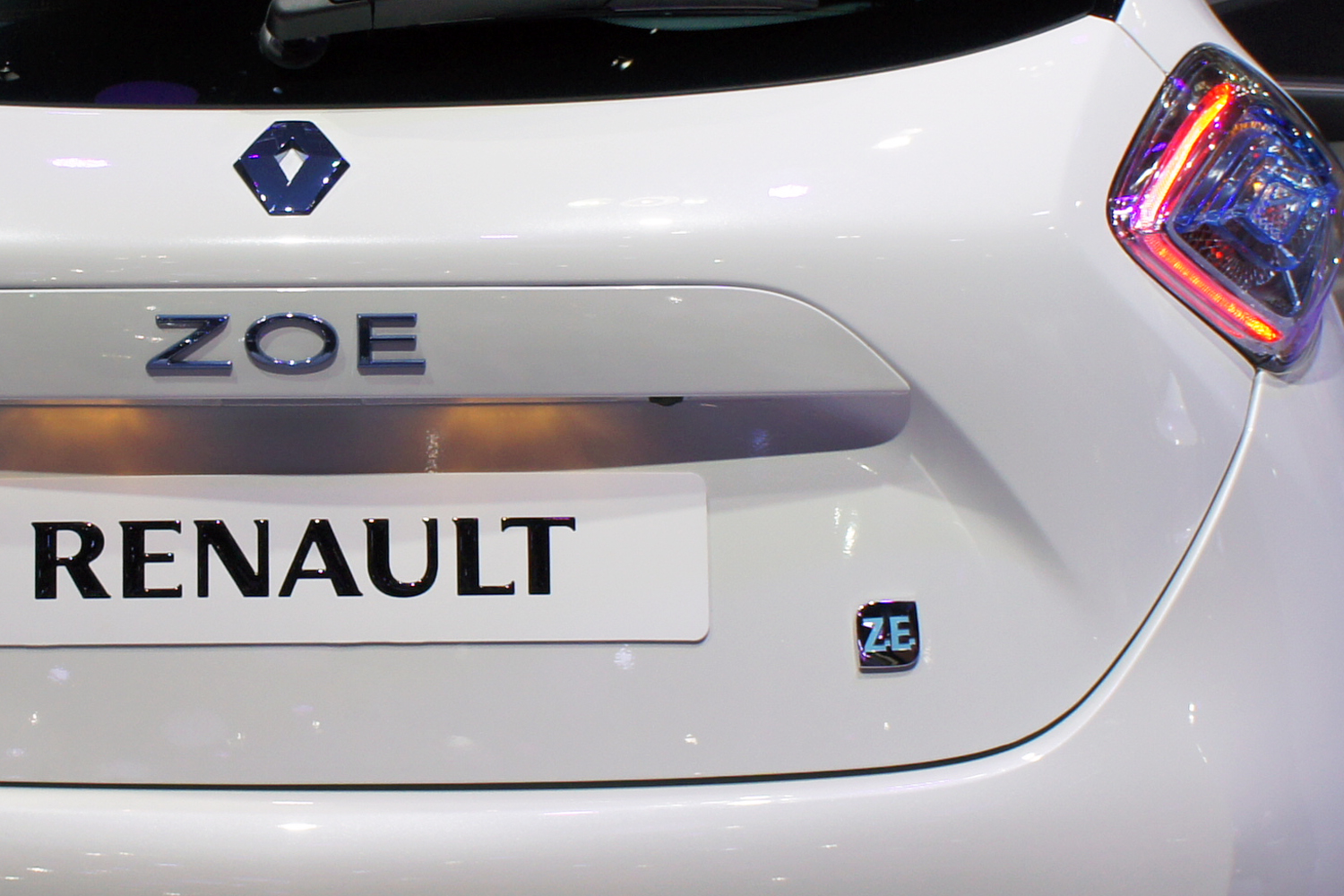
Renault Zoe Zero Emissions (ZE) badge

Deliveries in the UK began in March 2013, and Germany, Italy and Spain in April 2013. Cumulative global sales totaled 8,874 units through December 2013. Out of 8,792 cars sold in Europe through December 2013, 62.7% were sold in France (5,511). Germany was the second top selling market, with 1,019 units delivered through December 2013, followed by the Netherlands with 547 units registered.

The Renault Zoe was officially launched in the Norwegian market in April 2014, though retail deliveries began in late March. Unlike other European countries, the Zoe is sold in Norway with the battery pack included and there are no battery leasing options available. A total of 11,323 Zoes were sold globally in 2014. France continued as the top selling market with cumulative sales of 11,529 units, and the Zoe continued as the all-time best selling electric car in the country, with 5,970 units sold in 2014. Global sales reached the 10,000 unit mark in January 2014, and 25,000 in May 2015. The milestone of 50,000 units produced was reached in April 2016, while sales achieved the 50,000 unit milestone in June 2016.

With a record 10,406 units sold in 2015, the Zoe was again the top selling all-electric car in France, and continued as the best-selling electric car in the country ever. The Zoe, with 18,453 registrations, was the top selling pure electric car in Europe in 2015. The Zoe ranked as the world's 8th best-selling electric car in 2015. As of June 2016, France remained as the Zoe's top country market, with 27,155 units registered since its inception in 2012. Zoe sales in the French market represented 53% of global sales.

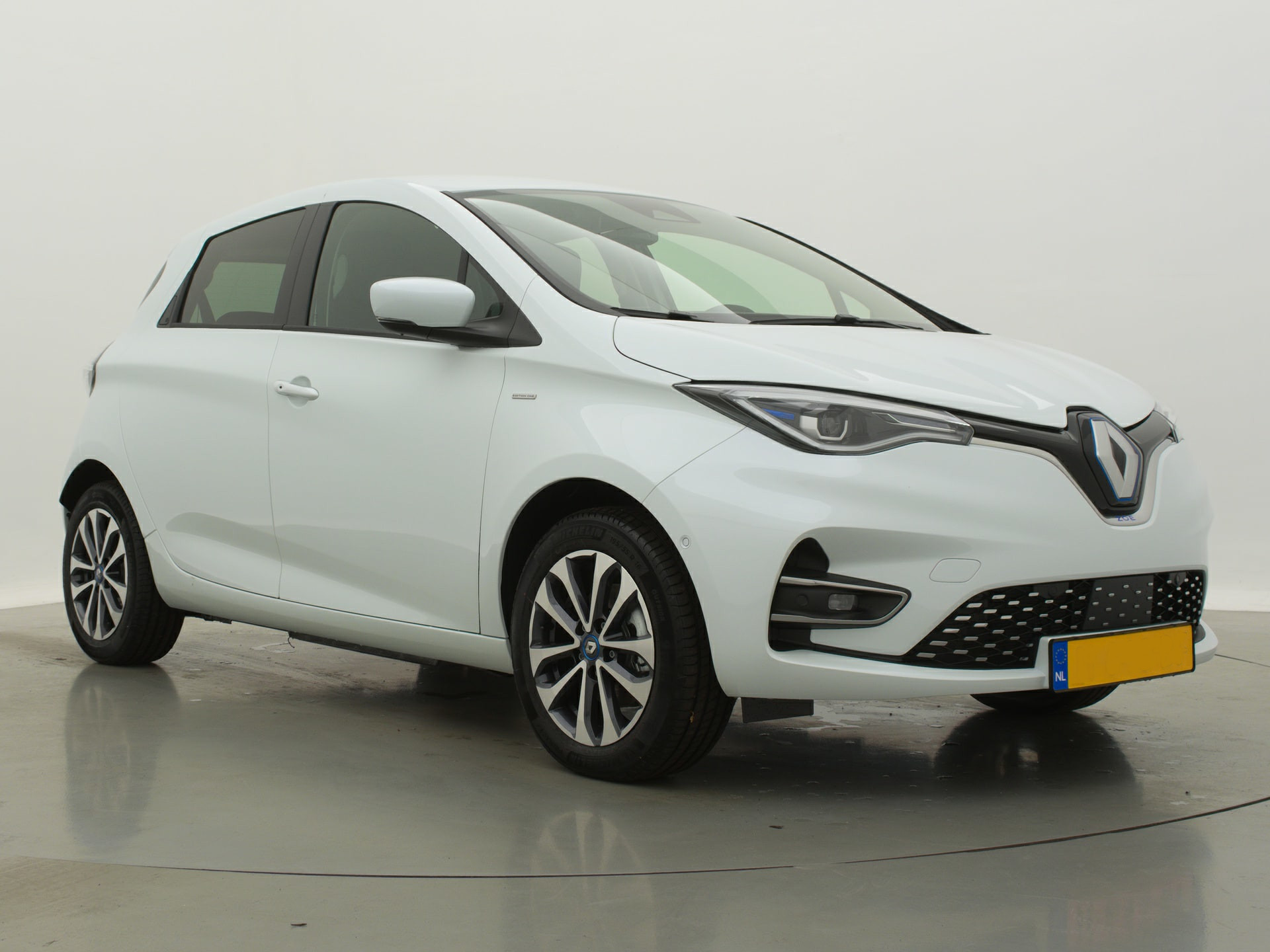
Since 2020, the Renault Zoe ranks as Europe's all-time best selling plug-in electric car.

The Zoe ranked as the best-selling all-electric car in Europe for the second year in a row in 2016 with 21,735 units delivered, representing 21.2% of the segment sales that year. Also, the Zoe topped European sales in the broader plug-in electric car segment, ahead of the Mitsubishi Outlander P-HEV, the top selling plug-in in the previous two years. In 2016 the Zoe ranked again as the world's 8th best-selling electric car. As of December 2016, the Zoe ranked as the world's all-time eighth best selling plug-in car.

Global sales totaled 31,932 units in 2017 and 40,517 in 2018. Global sales reached the 150,000 unit milestone in June 2019, and the 200,000th Zoe produced rolled off the Flins plant in November 2019. Annual sales passed the 100,000 unit mark in 2020 for the first time, and the Zoe listed as the best selling plug-in passenger car in Europe in 2020, and by the end of 2020, the Zoe ranked as the all-time best selling plug-in car in Europe.

As of 30 June 2020, the Zoe continued as France's all-time best selling plug-in with more than 100,000 units registered, and has led electric car sales in the French market for seven years running, from 2013 to 2019. Since inception, global sales totaled 284,761 units through December 2020 including both the passenger and cargo variants.

2021 saw the Zoe fall behind the Tesla Model 3 as the best-selling plug-in electric car in France.

Renault Zoe sales by top national markets^{(1)} 2012–2020
Country	Sales									
Country	cumulative	2020	2019	2018	2017	2016	2015	2014	2013	2012
France	84,437	—N/a	18,817	17,038	15,245	11,402	10,406	5,970	5,511	48
Germany	57,603	30,381	9,431	6,360	4,322	2,805	1,787	1,498	1,019	
Norway	13,995	2,346	2,090	3,141	2,533	1,818	1,634	433		
United Kingdom	10,510	—N/a	2,380	1,981	1,175	1,647	1,971	1,104	252	
Austria	7,440	2,071	944	1,170	1,391	829	279	387	369	
Sweden	7,364	2,132	2,036	1,663	533	418	378	204		
Netherlands	7,284	2,073	2,208	1,017	781	183	223	252	547	
Switzerland	5,055	—N/a	1,799	908	741	406	478	381	342	
Spain	5,025	—N/a	1,051	1,418	1,327	446	312	289	182	
Portugal	3,381	—N/a	968	1,305	751	170	153	34		
Denmark	2,564	—N/a	568	431	386	612	330	145	92	
Belgium	1,749	—N/a	666	294	351	210	33	110	85	
Italy	—N/a	—N/a	—N/a	—N/a	318	210	326	155	203	
Luxembourg	—N/a	—N/a	—N/a	67	75	—N/a	—N/a	—N/a		
Iceland	—N/a	—N/a	59	63	85	—N/a	—N/a	—N/a		
Finland	282	142	23	55	60	2				
Romania	—N/a	—N/a	—N/a	—N/a	49	—N/a	—N/a	—N/a		
Turkey	—N/a	—N/a	31	79	42	20	36	21		
Global sales	284,791	102,868	48,269	40,517	31,932	22,009	18,931	11,323	8,874	68
Notes: (1) Global annual sales includes passenger cars and its light utility variant.

=== Recognition ===
The Zoe was one of the top three finalists for the 2013 World Green Car of the Year.

=== Criticism ===
Technology blog Techdirt suggested that the Zoe's battery pack could contain digital rights management software, on the grounds that the original battery lease agreements for the Zoe gave Renault the right to prevent the car's battery from charging at end of lease. Following an Electronic Frontier Foundation article which cited Techdirt's supposition to argue that this could render the vehicle unusable if the owner ceases payment or Renault withdraws support, Renault publicly denied any use of DRM technology through its official Twitter account.

== Name dispute ==
In May 2010, a Parisian woman named Zoe Renault commenced legal action to try to force Renault to rethink their choice of name amid claims it would lead to mocking her. In November 2010, a French judge ruled that Renault could use the name.

== Discontinuation ==
In 2024, Renault has launched the 5 E-Tech, which replaced the Zoe after being on the market for 12 model years in a single generation.

In December 2023, the model was withdrawn from sale in the United Kingdom, production ended in March 2024 with 426,706 units having been manufactured overall.

== See also ==
- Battery balancing (LBC)
- Government incentives for plug-in electric vehicles
- List of production battery electric vehicles
- Plug-in electric vehicle
- Renault Twizy
- Renault Z.E.
- Zero-emissions vehicle
- Nissan Leaf
