= Renault E-Tech Electric =

Renault E-Tech Electric may refer to:

- Renault Kangoo E-Tech Electric
- Renault Mégane E-Tech Electric
- Renault Scénic E-Tech Electric
- Renault 5 E-Tech
- Renault 4 E-Tech
- Renault Twingo E-Tech
- Renault Trucks T E-Tech
