= List of Renault vehicles =

Renault is an automobile manufacturer based in France, established in 1899. This is a list of vehicles badged as Renault. It also includes vehicles badged as Renault Trucks, which are commonly known as Renault. This list does not include vehicles marketed under Alpine, Mobilize, or Dacia marques.

== Current models ==
Vehicles not sold in the core European market

Model		Calendar year introduced	Current model		Vehicle description
Image	Name	Calendar year introduced	Introduced	Update/ facelift	Vehicle description
Hatchback
	Twingo E-Tech	1992	2025	—	Battery electric city car (A-segment) marketed predominantly in Europe.
	Kwid / City K-ZE / Climber	2015	2015	2026	Entry-level crossover-styled city car sold predominantly in India, Brunei, and Latin America. The electric version called the City K-ZE is sold in China.
	Kardian	2023	2023	—	Supermini (B-segment) hatchback shares some parts with the third generation Dacia Sandero.
	5 E-Tech	2024	2024	—	Retro-styled battery electric supermini car (B-segment).
	Clio/Lutecia	1990	2025	—	Supermini (B-segment) hatchback. Traditionally the best-selling Renault model. Also known as the Lutecia in Japan.
	Mégane E-Tech Electric	1995	2021	2026	Battery electric small family car (C-segment).
SUV/crossover
	Kiger	2021	2021	2025	Entry-level subcompact (B-segment) SUV mainly destined for the Indian market.
	4 E-Tech	2025	2025	—	Retro-styled battery electric subcompact SUV (B-segment).
	Duster	2012	2024	—	Rebadged Dacia Duster for markets that do not use the Dacia brand.
	Captur	2013	2019	2024	Subcompact SUV (B-segment) based on the Clio platform.
	Boreal	2025	2025	—	Compact SUV (C-segment) based on the Dacia Bigster.
	Symbioz	2024	2024	—	Compact SUV (C-segment) based on the Captur smaller than the Austral.
	Austral	2022	2022	2025	Compact (C-segment) compact SUV.
	Scenic E-Tech	1996	2024	—	Battery electric compact SUV (C-segment) based on Mégane.
	Rafale	2023	2023	—	Mid-size coupé SUV (D-segment) based on Austral.
	Espace	1984	2023	2025	Mid-size SUV (D-segment) SUV based on Austral.
	Koleos/Grand Koleos	2006	2024	—	Mid-size SUV (D-segment) SUV based on the Geely Xingyue L.
	Filante	2026	2026	—	Mid-size SUV (D-segment) SUV based on Geely's Compact Modular Architecture. Largest model to date.
MPV/minivan
	Triber	2019	2019	2025	Sub-4 meter three-row mini MPV mainly destined for the Indian market.
	Kangoo	1997	2021	—	Passenger version of the Kangoo.
	Trafic Combi	2001	2014	—	Passenger version of the Trafic.
Van
	Kangoo (South America)	1997	2021	—	Rebadged and restyled Dacia Dokker produced in Argentina and sold throughout South America.
	Express	2021 (1985 original)	2021	—	Small van under the Kangoo, heavily based on the Dacia Dokker. Nameplate was revived in 2021 for an entry-level van, previously the predecessor of the Kangoo.
	Kangoo	1997	2021	—	Small van/leisure activity vehicle. Battery electric variant available as the Kangoo E-Tech Electric.
	Trafic	1980	2014	2021	Mid-size van.
	Master	1980	2024	—	Large van. Battery electric variant available as the Master E-Tech Electric.
Pickup truck
	Oroch	2015	2015	—	Pickup truck version of the Duster for the South American market, formerly Duster Oroch.
	Niagara	2026 (upcoming)	2026 (upcoming)	—	Pickup truck version of the Boreal for the South American market, intends to be successor of Oroch.
	Master Tipper/Dropside	1980	2024	—	Pickup truck version of the Master.
Truck
	C	2013	2013	2021	A range of medium duty/high duty trucks for construction.
	D	2013	2013	2022	A range of medium duty trucks for distribution.
	K	2013	2013	2021	A range of heavy duty trucks for construction.
	T	2013	2013	2021	A range of heavy duty trucks for long-distance.

== Historic models ==
=== Pre–World War I To World War I (1899–1918) ===
- Voiturette (Type A/Type B/Type C/Type D/Type E/Type G/Type H/Type J) (1899–1903)
- 8CV (Type L/Type M/Type Z/Type AJ/Type AL/Type AN/Type AX) (1902–1914)
  - 7CV (Type R/Type T) (1903–1904)
  - 14CV (Type N (a)/Type N (b)/Type U (b)/Type U (c)/Type U (d)/Type X/Type AB/Type BX/Type CC/Type DJ) (1903–1914)
    - 10CV (Type N (c)/Type Q/Type U (a)/Type U (e)/Type Y/Type AH/Type AM/Type BK/Type GS/Type IC/Type IG/Type II/Type IM/Type JR) (1903–1923) (Was facelifted as the Renault KZ in 1923)
    - 20CV (Type S/Type V/Type AS/Type BY/Type BM/Type CE/Type CH/Type DX/Type EI/Type EJ) (1903–1919)
      - 18CV (Type BF/Type CD/Type ED/Type FE/Type FS/Type GR/Type GV/Type HG/Type IQ/Type JS/Type JY/Type KD/Type MG/Type PI/Type PZ) (1909–1928)
        - 22CV (Type DO/Type DP/Type EE) (1913–1914)
  - Taxi de la Marne (Type AG/Type AG–1) (1905–1921)
  - 9CV (Type EK/Type FD) (1913–1920)
- 35CV (Type AI/Type AO/Type CF/Type CI/Type DQ/Type ET) (1906–1917)
- 40CV (Type AR/Type BH/Type CG/Type DT/Type ES/Type HD/Type IR/Type JP/Type IR1/Type IR2/Type JD/Type JV/Type JV1/Type MC/Type MC1/Type NM) (1908–1928)
- 12CV (Type AZ/Type BZ/Type CB/Type DG/Type EF/Type EU/Type JM/Type JT/Type KH/Type LS/Type ME) (1909–1926)
- 11CV (Type CQ/Type DM/Type ER/Type FK) (1912–1919)
- EG (1914–1919)

=== Between the wars (1919–1939) ===
- 6CV (KJ/MT/NN) (1922–1930)
- KZ (1923–1932)
  - Primaquatre (1931–1941)
    - AGx (1937–1941)
  - Vivaquatre (1932–1939)
- 15CV (Type KR/Type NE/Type NO/Type NS/Type PG/Type PK/Type PL/Type PM/Type RA) (1924–1928)
  - Vivasix (1927–1934)
    - Vivastella (1929–1939)
    - Primastella (1932–1934)
- Monasix (1927–1931)
  - Monastella (1928–1932)
- Reinastella (1929–1933)
  - Reinasport (1932–1934)
- Nervastella (1929–1936)
  - Nervahuit (1930–1931)
  - Nervasport (1932–1935)
    - Nerva Grand Sport (1935–1938)
      - Suprastella (1938–1939)
- Monaquatre (1932–1936)
- Vivasport (1933–1935)
  - Viva Grand Sport (1935–1939)
- Renault ZP, ABF and ABG (1934–1937)
- Celtaquatre (1934–1938)
  - Celtastandard (1935–1937)
- ACx/ADx (1935–1940)
- Juvaquatre (1937–1957) (Was facelifted as the Renault Dauphinoise in 1957)
- Novaquatre (1938–1940)

=== World War II (1939–1945) ===
- AHx (1941–1947)

=== After World War II to 1970 (1945–1970) ===
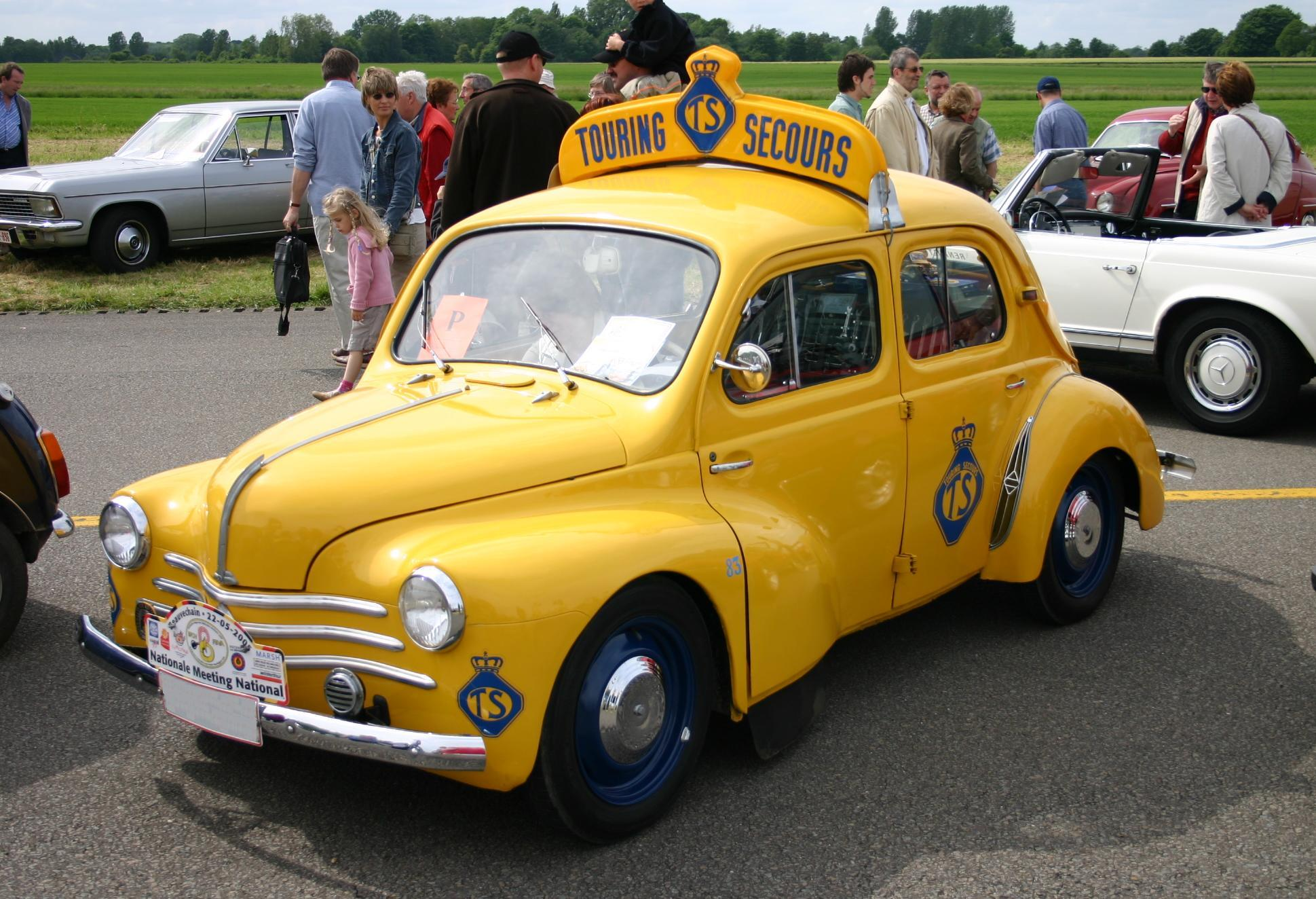
Renault 4CV Belgium AA

- 208D (1945–1948)
  - R.4080 (1948–1950)
- 4CV (1947–1961)
- Galion (1947–1965)
  - Super Galion (1965–1982)
- Voltigeur (1947–1965)
  - Goélette (1949–1965)
    - Super Goélette (1965–1982)
- Colorale, including Prairie and Savane versions (1950–1956)
- Fainéant (1950–1967)
- Frégate (1951–1960)
- MTP (1956–1959)
- JL (1956–1964)
- Dauphine (1956–1967)
  - Ondine (1961–1962)
- Dauphinoise (1957–1960)
- Floride (1959–1962)
  - Caravelle (1959–1968)
- Estafette (1959–1980)
- Rambler (1962–1967)
- S (1964–1967)
  - SM (1967–1977)
    - SM8 (1967–1989)

=== Numeric models (1961–1996) ===
- 3 (1961–1962)
  - 4 (1961–1992)
    - 4 Fourgonette (1961–1988) succeeded by Express
- 8 (1962–1973)
  - 10 (1965–1971)
- 16 (1965–1980)
- 6 (1968–1980)
- 12 (1969–1980)
- 15 (1971–1979)
  - 17 (1971–1979)
- 5 (aka "Le Car") (1972–1996) succeeded by Clio
  - 7 (Spain only) (1974–1984)
- 30 (1975–1983)
  - 20 (1975–1984)
- 14 (1976–1983)
- 18 (1978–1986) succeeded by 21
- 9 (1981–1989) succeeded by 19
  - 11 (1983–1989) succeeded by 19
- 25 (1984–1992) succeeded by Safrane
- 21 (1986–1995) succeeded by Laguna
- 19 (1988–1996) succeeded by Mégane

=== Former vehicles in production ===
- Rodeo (1970–1986)
- J (1975–1980)
  - Midliner (1980–1999)
- Torino (Argentina only) (1975–1981)
- H (1977–1980)
- Virage (Australia only) (1978–1980)
- Bandama (Africa only) (1978–1981)
- 100 Series (1979–1989)
- 50 Series (1979–1993)
- Farma (Greece only) (1980–1985)
- Fuego (1980–1986)
- G (1980–1992)
- R (1980–1996)
- Alliance (North America only) (1982–1987)
  - Encore (North America only) (1984–1987)
- B (1982–1999)
- Express (1985–2000) succeeded by Kangoo
- Premier (North America only) (1986–1987)
- CBH (1986–1997)
- Medallion (North America only) (1987–1988)
- Magnum (1990–2013)
- Safrane (1992–2002) succeeded by Vel Satis
- Laguna (1994–2015) succeeded by Talisman
- Spider (1995–1999)
- Puncher (1995–2009)
- Scénic RX4 (2000-2003) succeeded by Scénic Conquest
- Premium (1996–2014)
- Kerax (1997–2014)
- Grand Espace (1998–2015)
- Mascott (1999–2010)
- Midlum (1999–2013)
- Symbol (Africa, Central Europe, Eastern Europe, Latin America, Middle East, Russia, and Turkey only) (1999–2021) succeeded by Taliant
  - Logan (Africa, Central Europe, Eastern Europe, Latin America, Middle East, Russia, and Turkey only) (2004–2021)
- PK (Iran only) (2000–2007)
- Avantime (2001–2003)
- Vel Satis (2001–2009) succeeded by Latitude
- Grand Scénic (2004-2022)
- Modus (2004–2012)
  - Grand Modus (2008–2012)
- Maxity (2007–2019)
- Koleos (Europe) (2008–2023) succeeded by Espace IV
- Sandero (2008–2025)
- Fluence (2009–2016) succeeded by Mégane IV Saloon
  - Fluence Z.E. (2011–2014)
  - Scala (Mexico) (2010–2013)
    - Scala (India) (2012–2017)
- Access (2010–2013)
- Wind (2010–2013)
- Latitude (2010–2015)
- Pulse (India only) (2012–2017)
- Talisman (China) (2012–2020)
  - Talisman (Europe) (2015–2022)
- Twizy (2012–2023) succeeded by Mobilize Duo
- Zoe (2012–2024), succeeded by R5 E-Tech Electric
- Kadjar (2015–2022)
- Alaskan (2016–2025)
- Arkana (2019–2025)
- Taliant (2020-2025)

== Concept cars ==
- Renault R17 Electric Restomod x Ora Ïto (2024)
- Twingo Legend (2023)
- 4Ever Trophy (2022)
- 5 EV (2021)
- Alaskan (2015)
- Altica (2006)
- Argos (1994)
- Arkana (2018)
- Avantime (1999)
- Be Bop (2003)
- Bridger (2026)
- Captur (2011)
- Coupe Corbusier (2015)
- DCross (2012)
- DeZir (2010)
- E-Space (2026)
- Emblème (2024)
- Egeus (2005)
- Ellypse (2002)
- Eolab (2014)
- Espider (1998)
- Étoile Filante (1954)
- Evado (1995)
- Eve (1981)
- EZ-GO (2018)
- EZ-PRO (2018)
- EZ-ULTIMO (2018)
- Fiftie (1996)
- Fluence (2004)
- Filante (2025)
- Frendzy (2011)
- Gabbiano (1983)
- Initiale (1995)
- Initiale Paris (2013)
- K-ZE (2018)
- Koleos (2000)
- Koleos (2006)
- Kwid (2014)
- Laguna (1990)
- Long Cours (1994)
- Ludo (1994)
- Mégane (1988)
- Modus (1994)
- Modus (2004)
- Morphoz (2020)
- Nepta (2006)
- Next (1995)
- Ondelios (2008)
- Operandi (2000)
- Pangea (1997)
- R8 Coupe (1964)
- Racoon (1993)
- Reinastella (1992)
- R-Space (2011)
- R-Space Lab (2026)
- Scenic (1991)
- Scénic (2007)
- Symbioz (2017)
- Talisman (2001)
- Trezor (2016)
- Twin'Run (2013)
- Twin’Z (2013)
- Wind (2004)
- Vel Satis (1998)
- Vesta (1983)
- Vesta 2 (1987)
- Z.E. (2008–2010)
- Zo (1998)
- Zoe (2005)
- Zoom (1992)

== Others ==
=== Buses ===
- Type PR (1926–1930)
- PN (1926–1930)
- TN (1931–1971)
- 215D (1946–1949)
- R4200 (1949–1957)
  - ZR20 (1958–1960)
    - SC1 (1960–1964)
- UI20 (1958–1959)
- S45 (1964–1993)
- SC10 (1965–1989), initially launched by Saviem
- E7 (1969–1983)
- SG220 (1978–1983)
- PR14 (1979–1989)
- PR100 (1980–1999)
- FR1 (1983–1996)
  - Iliade (1996–2002)
- R312 (1987–1997)
- Tracer (1991–2002)
- Agora (1995–2002)
- Récréo (1996–2001)
- Ares (1998–2002)

=== Tanks ===
- FT (1917–1949)
  - D1 (1932–1943)
    - D2 (1936–1940)
- UE Chenillette (1932–1941)
- AMR 33 (1933–1935)
  - AMR 35 (1936–1939)
- AMC 34 (1935–1940)
  - AMC 35 (1938–1940)
- R35 (1936–1940)
  - R40 (1940)
- B1 (1936–1945)
