= Renault Filante =

The Renault Filante is an automotive nameplate used by Renault for three different models:

- Renault Étoile Filante, 1954 concept car
- Renault Filante (concept), 2025 concept car
- Renault Filante (crossover), mid-size crossover SUV
