= Renault Morphoz =

Overview
- Type: Concept Car [Electric Car]
- Manufacturer: Renault
- Production: 2020
- Model years: March 2020
- Designer: Renault

Body and chassis
- Class: Concept car
- Body style: 5-door SUV
- Doors: Conventional doors (front); Coach Doors (rear)

Powertrain
- Engine: electric traction engine
- Battery: Batteries: 40 kWh (City version) / 90 kWh (Travel version)
- Range: Power: 100 kW (City version) / 160 kW (Travel version)

Dimensions
- Wheelbase: 2,730–2,930 mm (107.5–115.4 in)
- Length: 4,460–4,870 mm (175.6–191.7 in)
- Width: 2,000 mm (78.7 in)
- Height: 1,550 mm (61.0 in)

The Renault Morphoz is an electric concept car built by Renault which was presented in March 2020.

== Presentation ==
The name Morphoz comes from the concept car's ability to modify its morphology, by modifying its length. The Morphoz follows the logic of the names of the concept cars that preceded it (DeZir, TreZor and Symbioz) by including a "Z" in his surname, just like the EZ concept series (EZ-Pro, EZ-Go, EZ-Ultimo, EZ-Flex, EZ-POD).

The Renault Morphoz concept car was to be presented at the 2020 Geneva Motor Show on 3 March 2020. but it was canceled due to the COVID-19 pandemic in Switzerland. On that date, however, it was unveiled in pictures on the Internet.
