= Étoile Filante =

Étoile Filante means "shooting star" in French. It may refer to:

- Étoile Filante Bastiaise (or ÉF Bastia for short) - French football club based in Biguglia on the island of Corsica
- Étoile Filante (Lomé) - football club based in Lomé, Togo
- Étoile Filante (Ouagadougou) - football club based in Ouagadougou, Burkina Faso
- Renault Étoile Filante - experimental turbine-powered car
