= 2016 Paris Motor Show =

International auto show

- Genre: Auto show
- Begins: October 1, 2016
- Ends: October 16, 2016
- Venue: Paris Expo Porte de Versailles
- Location: Paris
- Country: France
- Previous event: 2014 Paris Motor Show
- Next event: 2018 Paris Motor Show

The 2016 Paris Motor Show took place from 1 October to 16 October 2016.

== Introductions ==
=== Production cars ===
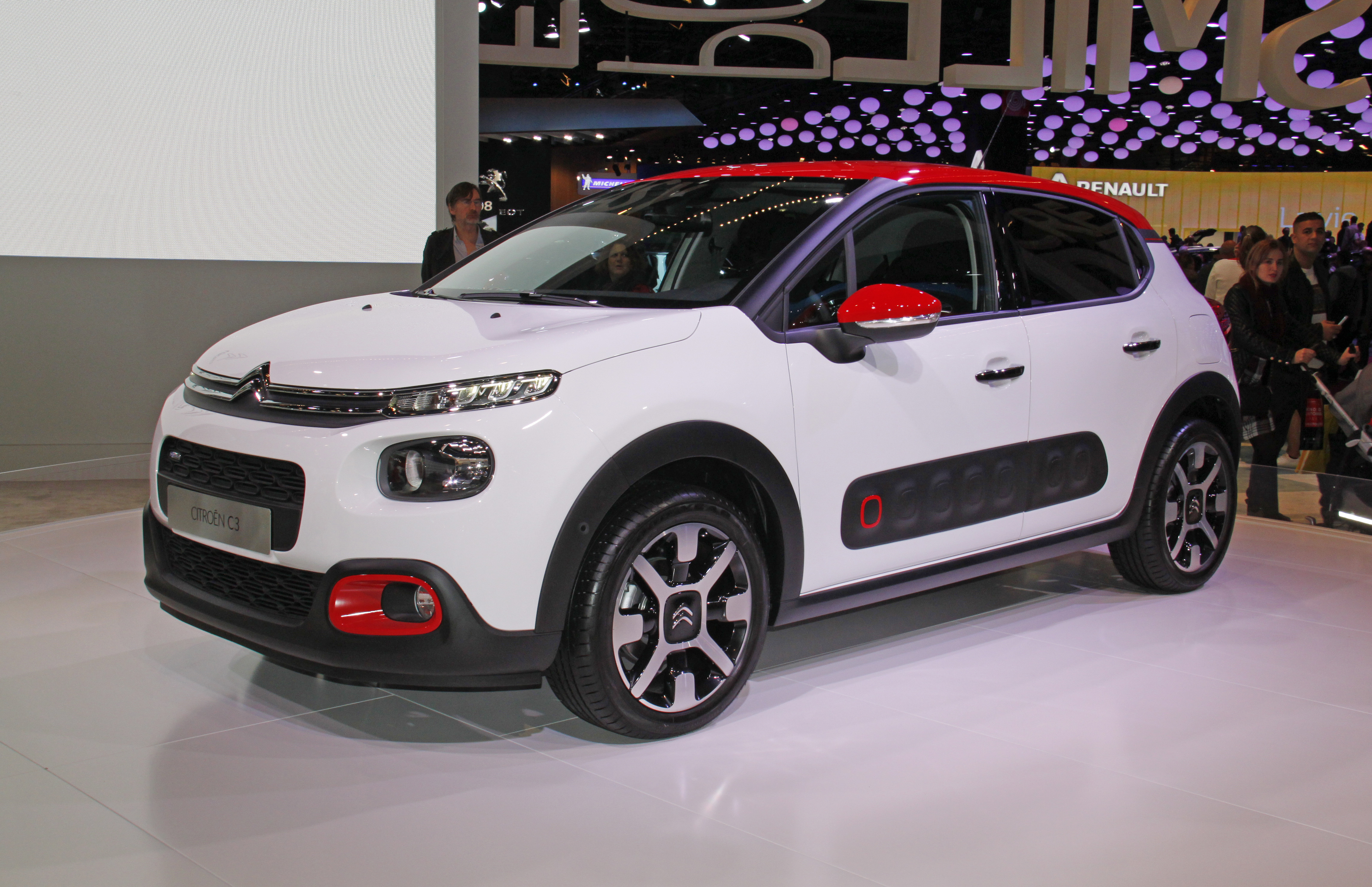
Citroën C3 at the 2016 Paris Motor Show

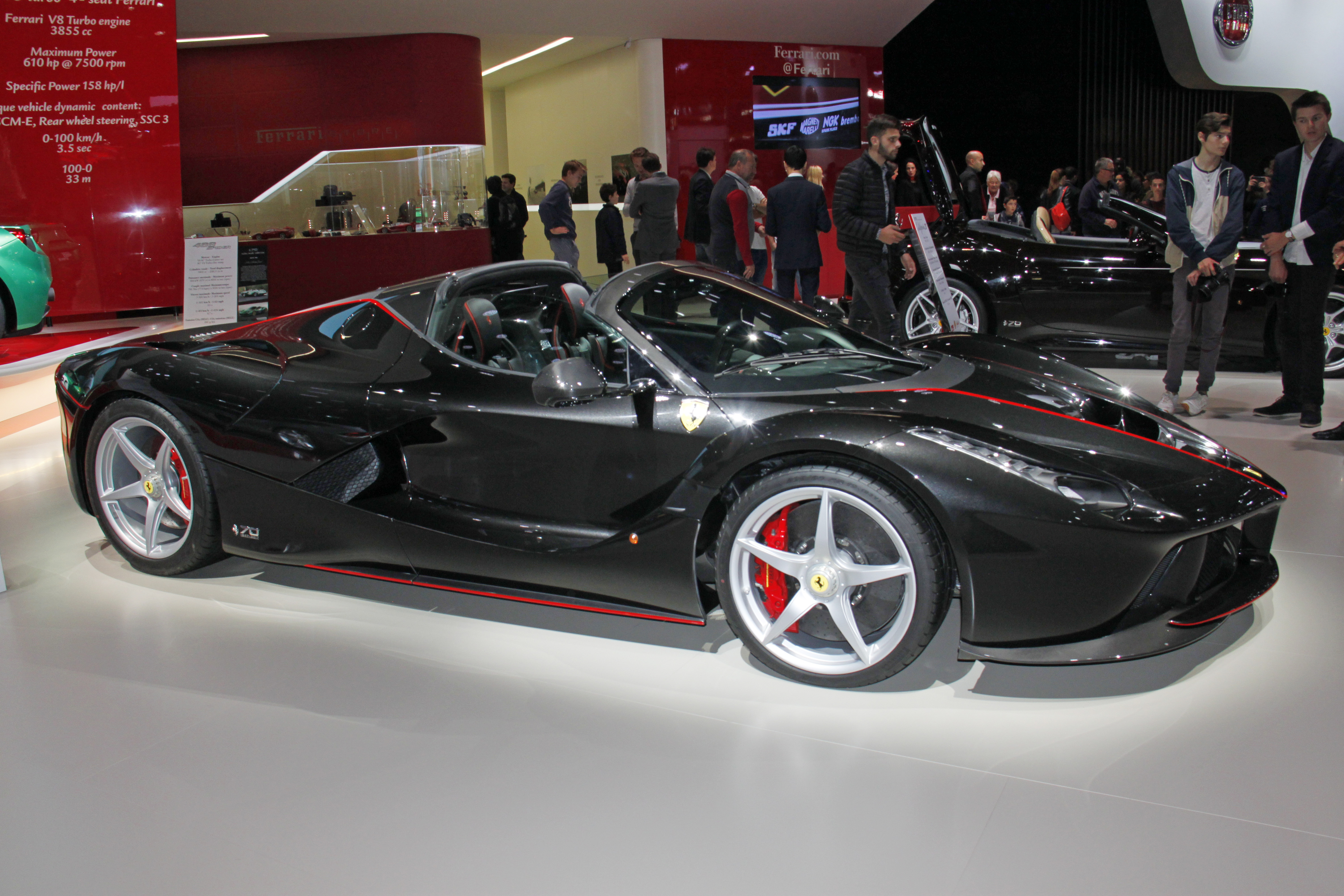
Ferrari LaFerrari Aperta at the 2016 Paris Motor Show

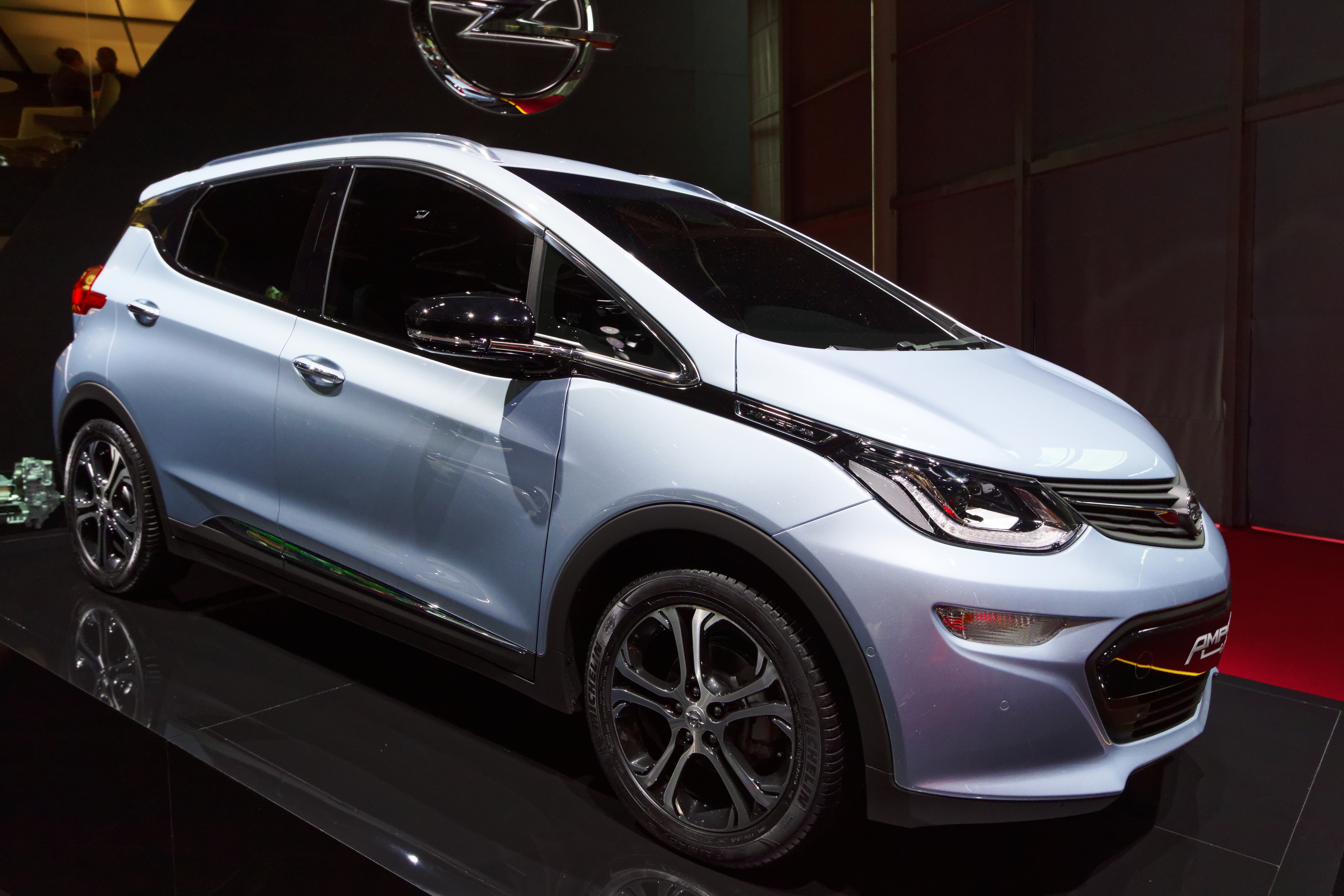
Opel Ampera-E at the 2016 Paris Motor Show

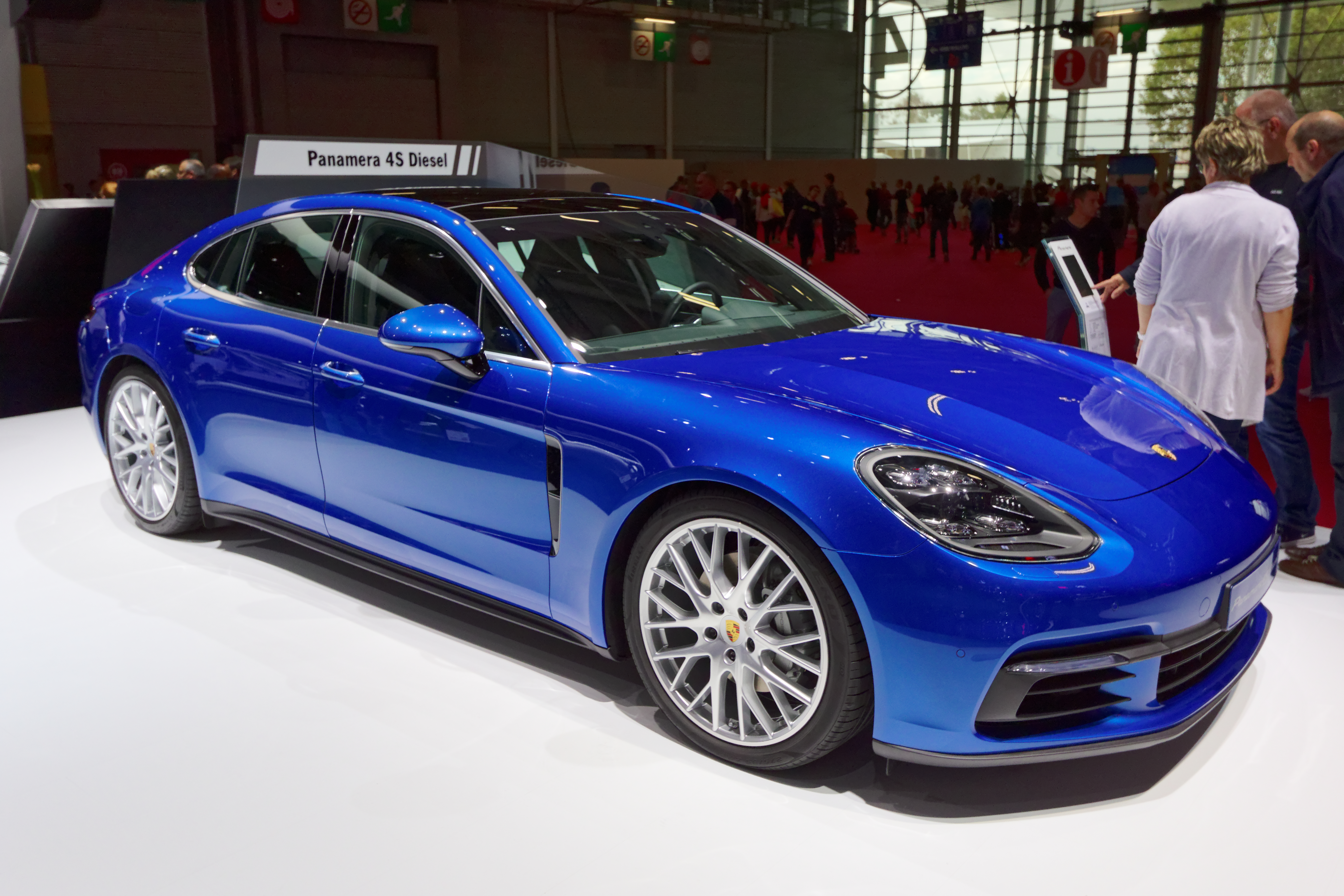
Porsche Panamera at the 2016 Paris Motor Show

- Abarth 595 (refresh)
- Alfa Romeo Giulia Veloce
- Audi Q3 (refresh)
- Audi Q5
- Audi RS3 Sedan
- Audi A5 Sportback
- Audi A5 Coupe
- BMW 3 Series GT (refresh)
- Citroën C3
- Dacia Logan (refresh)
- Dacia Sandero (refresh)
- Ferrari LaFerrari Aperta
- Ferrari GTC4Lusso T
- Honda Civic
- Hyundai i30
- Hyundai i20 (refresh) renamed Hyundai New Generation i20
- Jeep Grand Cherokee (refresh)
- Kia Rio
- Kia Soul (refresh)
- Kia Carens (refresh)
- Land Rover Discovery
- Maserati Quattroporte (facelift)
- Mercedes-AMG GT Roadster
- Mercedes-Benz E-Class Estate All-Terrain
- Mercedes-Benz E-Class Estate
- MINI Clubman JCW
- Nissan Micra
- Opel Karl Rocks
- Opel Ampera-e (all-electric car)
- Opel Zafira Tourer (refresh)
- Peugeot 3008
- Peugeot 5008
- Porsche Panamera
- Renault Zoe upgraded to deliver range of 300 km (190 mi) (all-electric car)
- Renault Clio (refresh)
- Renault Twingo GT
- Renault Grand Scenic
- Renault Koleos (European debut)
- Seat Mii (refresh)
- Skoda Kodiaq
- Smart Fortwo electric drive Cabriolet (convertible) (all-electric car)
- Suzuki SX4 S-Cross (refresh)
- Suzuki Ignis (European Debut)
- Toyota GT86 (refresh)

=== Concept cars ===
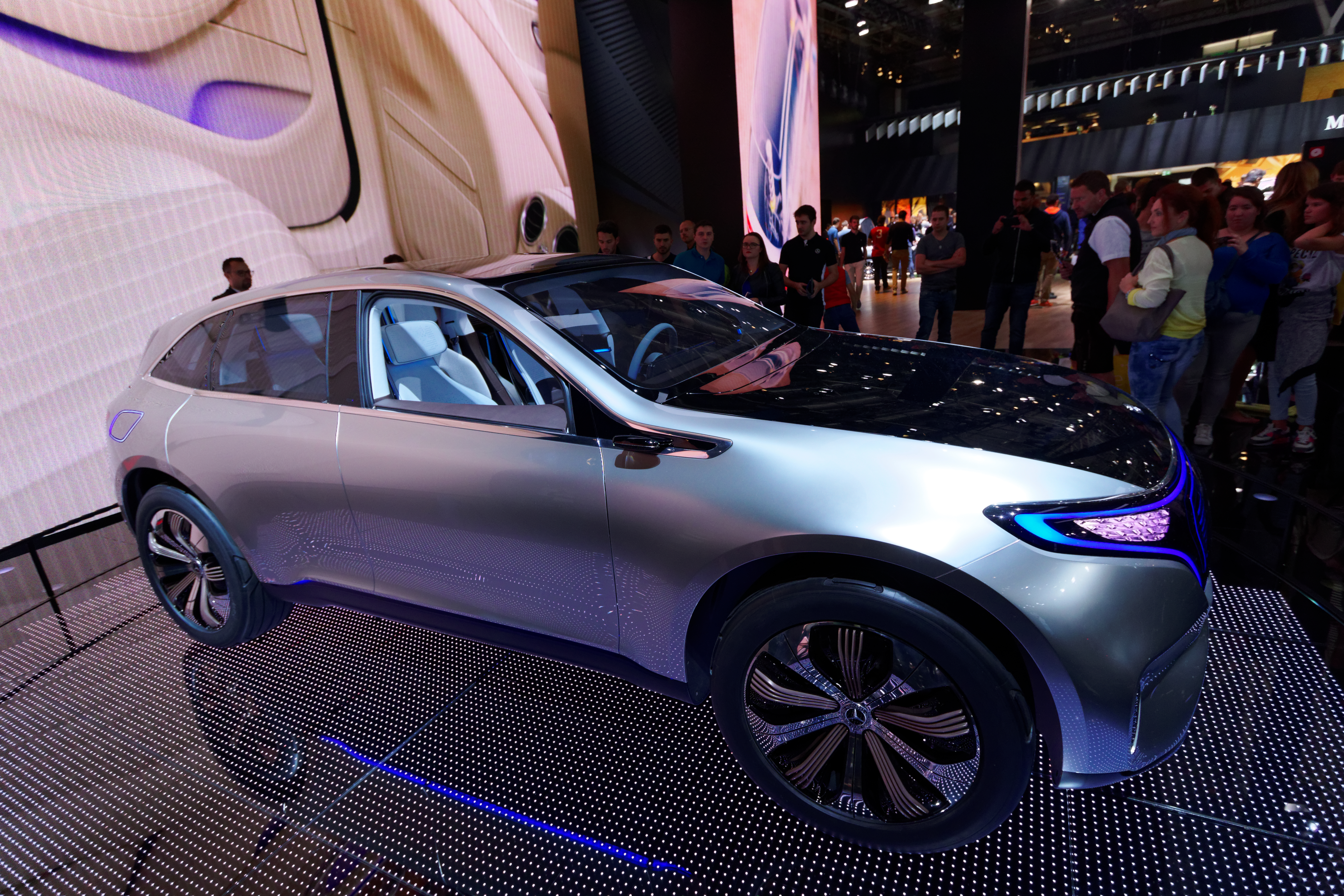
Mercedes-Benz Generation EQ

- BMW X2
- Citroën CXperience
- Honda Civic Type-R
- Hyundai N Concept RN30
- Lexus LF-UX
- Mercedes-Benz Generation EQ (all-electric car) SUV
- Mercedes-Maybach Vision 6 (all-electric car)
- Mitsubishi GT-PHEV
- Renault Trezor (all-electric car)
- Ssangyong LIV-2
- Volkswagen I.D. (all-electric car)

=== Motorsport cars ===
- Citroën C3 WRC (refresh)
- Hyundai i20 Coupe WRC (refresh)
- Toyota Yaris WRC (European Debut)

== See also ==
- Paris Motor Show
