= Renault Zo =

1998 open top concept car from Renault

Overview
- Type: Concept car
- Manufacturer: Renault
- Production: 1999

Body and chassis
- Class: Sports car
- Body style: 2-door roadster

Powertrain
- Engine: 2.0 L 16V diesel I4
- Transmission: Automatic

Dimensions
- Wheelbase: 2,475 mm (97.4 in)
- Length: 3,850 mm (151.6 in)
- Width: 1,850 mm (72.8 in)
- Height: 1,360 mm (53.5 in)
- Curb weight: 1,250 kg (2,756 lb)

The Renault Zo is an open top concept car from Renault which was introduced at the 1998 Geneva Motor Show.

== Engine ==
The Zo has a 2.0 litre 16V diesel engine with direct injection producing 101 kW (135 hp). It has an automatic gearbox.

== Innovation ==
The platform and the chassis are based on the Renault Spider. Therefore, the Zo is a pure two seater roadster having a pneumatic suspension system with a hydraulic pump which can adjust the ride height even when the car is being driven. On the dashboard there are only three round instruments for the speed, the revs and the fuel level.
