= Renault Symbioz (concept car) =

Electric concept car

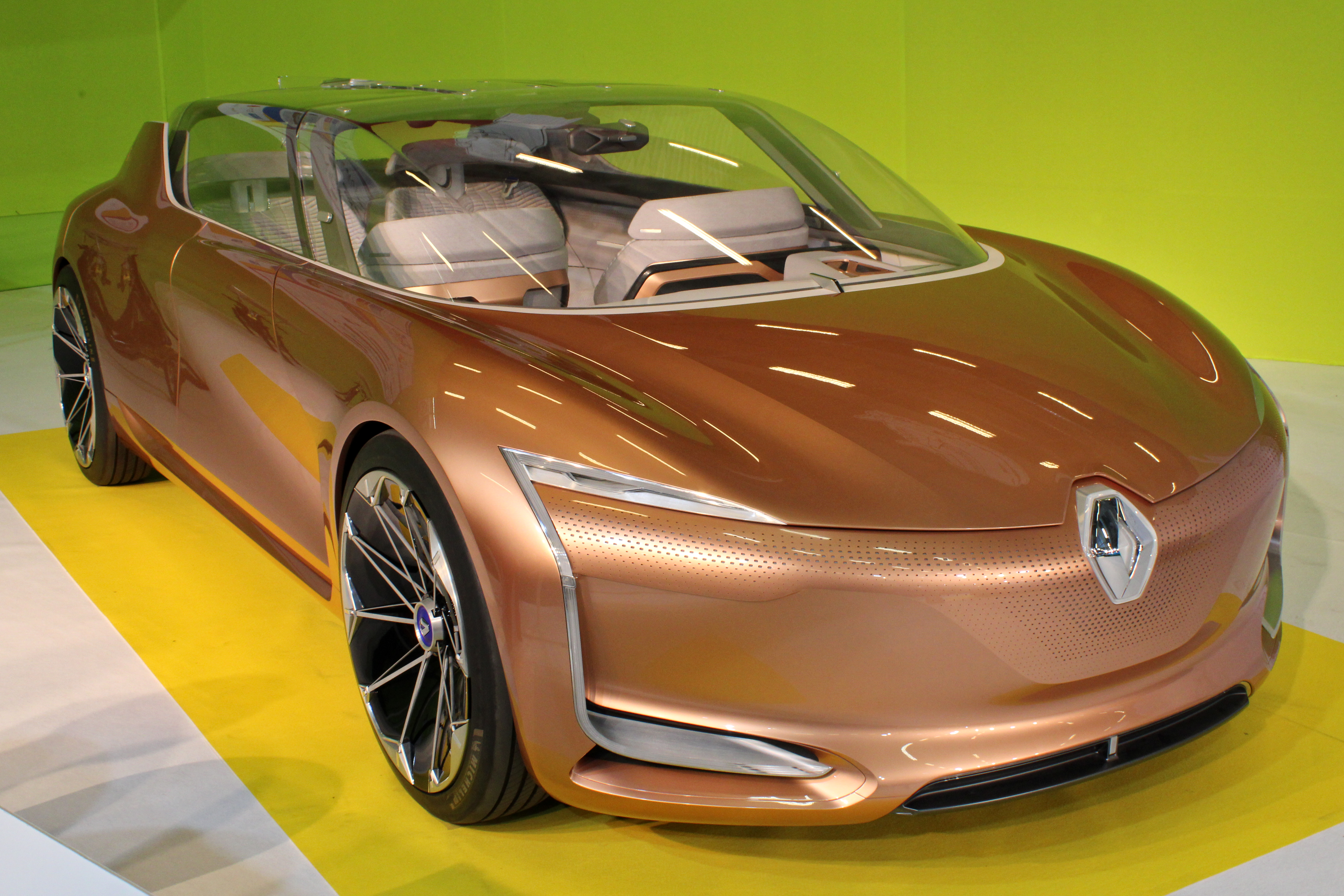

Overview
- Manufacturer: Renault
- Production: 2017 (concept car)
- Designer: Laurens van den Acker

Body and chassis
- Class: Concept car

Dimensions
- Length: 4,700 mm (185.0 in)
- Width: 1,980 mm (78.0 in)
- Height: 1,350 mm (53.1 in)

The Renault Symbioz is an electric concept car developed by Renault, which was unveiled at the 2017 International Motor Show Germany.

== Presentation ==
Presented at the press days of the Frankfurt Motor Show on 12 September 2017, the Renault Symbioz is a concept car that "is part of a new design cycle initiated by Trezor" according to the diamond brand. In 2010, Laurens van den Acker presented a daisy with six petals corresponding to so many concept cars symbolizing a moment "in the cycle of life" (Love (love), Explore (exploration), Family (family), Work (work), Play (leisure) and Wisdom). The DeZir is the first petal of this daisy and the Initial Paris the last. In 2016, the Renault TreZor is the first petal of the second daisy of Renault concept cars. It inaugurates a new series of six concept cars and corresponds to the “Love” life cycle like DeZir six years earlier. Symbioz is the last petal of this life cycle corresponding to wisdom (Wisdom). Thus for seven years, all these concept cars were extended to a life cycle and created the new visual identity of Renault, seen by Laurens van den Acker.

On 4 September 2017, before its presentation, Renault unveiled a video announcing the arrival of the Symbioz concept car at the IAA.

As with the models in Renault's electric range (Zoe, Twizy) or its concept cars (DeZir, Trezor), the Symbioz “Z” symbolizes “zero emissions”, and therefore electric motorization.

In November 2017, Renault presented a second version of its show car, called Symbioz “Demo-car”, capable of driving on open roads and which differs from the static concept car with headlights, doors and real conventional seats. This Symbioz is equipped with autonomous driving.

== Specifications ==
The Symbioz is equipped with two electric motors, one for each rear wheel, developing 680 hp in total for 660 N m of torque, it accelerates from 0 to 100 km/h in 6 seconds for a range of around 500 km.
