= Renault Ludo =

Concept car developed by Renault

The Renault Ludo is a concept car shown at the 1994 Paris Motor Show by the French car manufacturer Renault and was designed under the direction of Patrick Le Quément.

The Ludo is a compact city car designed to run on LPG and based on the Renault Twingo platform but with an aluminium structure and carbon fibre panels. The design is a distinctive 4-door layout, with the passenger side doors on a cantilevered system and a powered folding canvas roof. The driver side is a normal hinged door.

The lightweight structure results in a 750kg kerb weight. It was equipped with tall but narrow 125/80 17" wheels and tyres for aerodynamics and city potholes, a similar concept to the later BMW i3.
