= Renault Egeus =

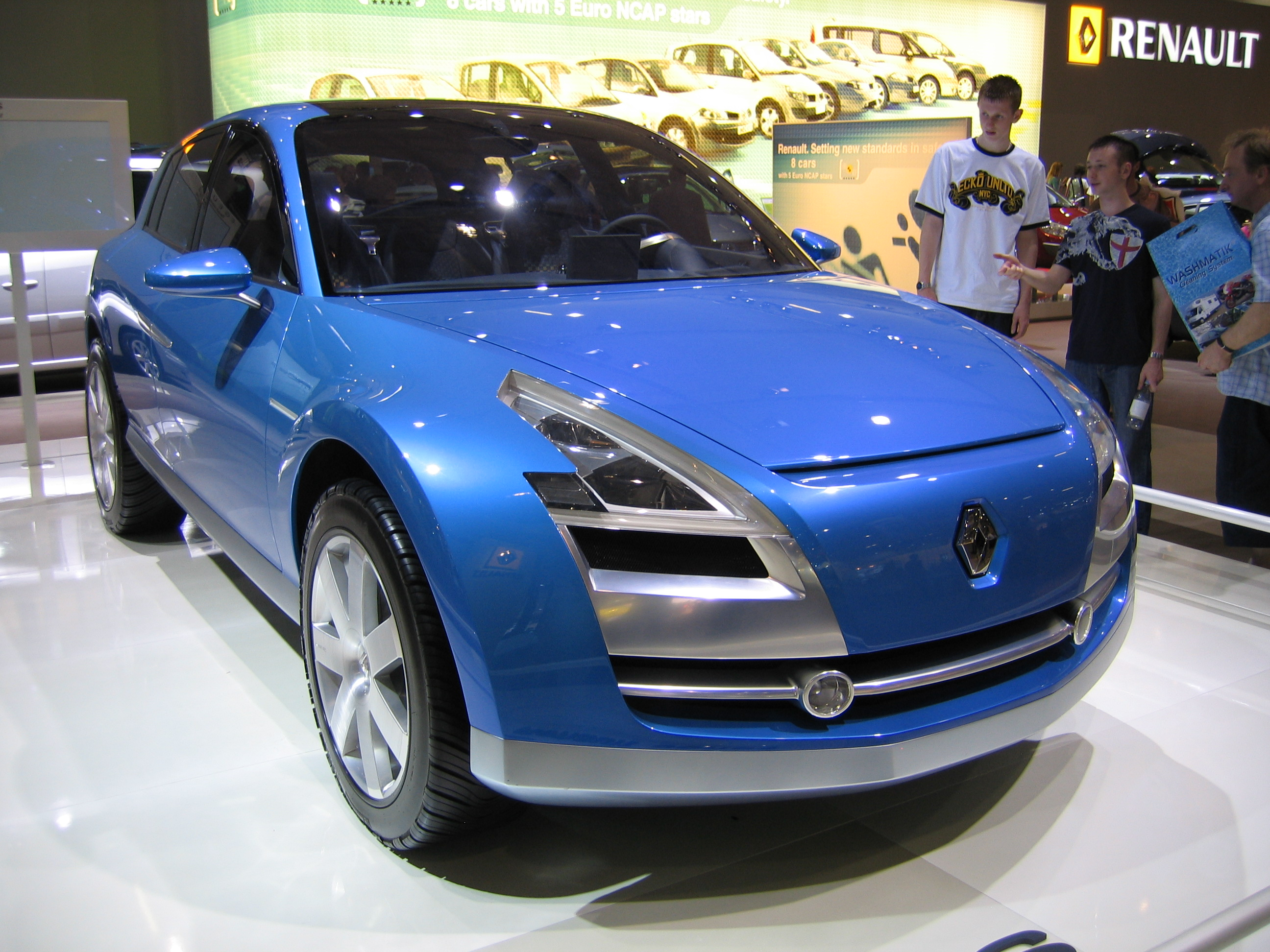

Overview
- Manufacturer: Renault
- Production: 2005 (concept car)
- Designer: Patrick Le Quément

Body and chassis
- Class: Mid-size luxury crossover SUV
- Body style: 5-door SUV
- Layout: Front-engine, all-wheel-drive

Powertrain
- Engine: 3.0 L V6
- Transmission: 7-speed automatic

Dimensions
- Length: 4,699 mm (185.0 in)
- Width: 1,920 mm (75.6 in)
- Height: 1,661 mm (65.4 in)

The Renault Egeus was a concept mid-size luxury crossover SUV presented at the 2005 Frankfurt Motor Show, developed by Renault. It was described as an upmarket 4WD crossover SUV.

== Design ==
The Egeus features seating for four, with independent, swiveling seats. The exterior features suicide rear doors, as well as flush door handles with sensors that detect when a person is approaching and extend outward.

== Engine ==
The engine is a 3.0 L V6 with 250 hp (186 kW), paired with a 7-speed automatic transmission, sending power to all four wheels.

== Gallery ==
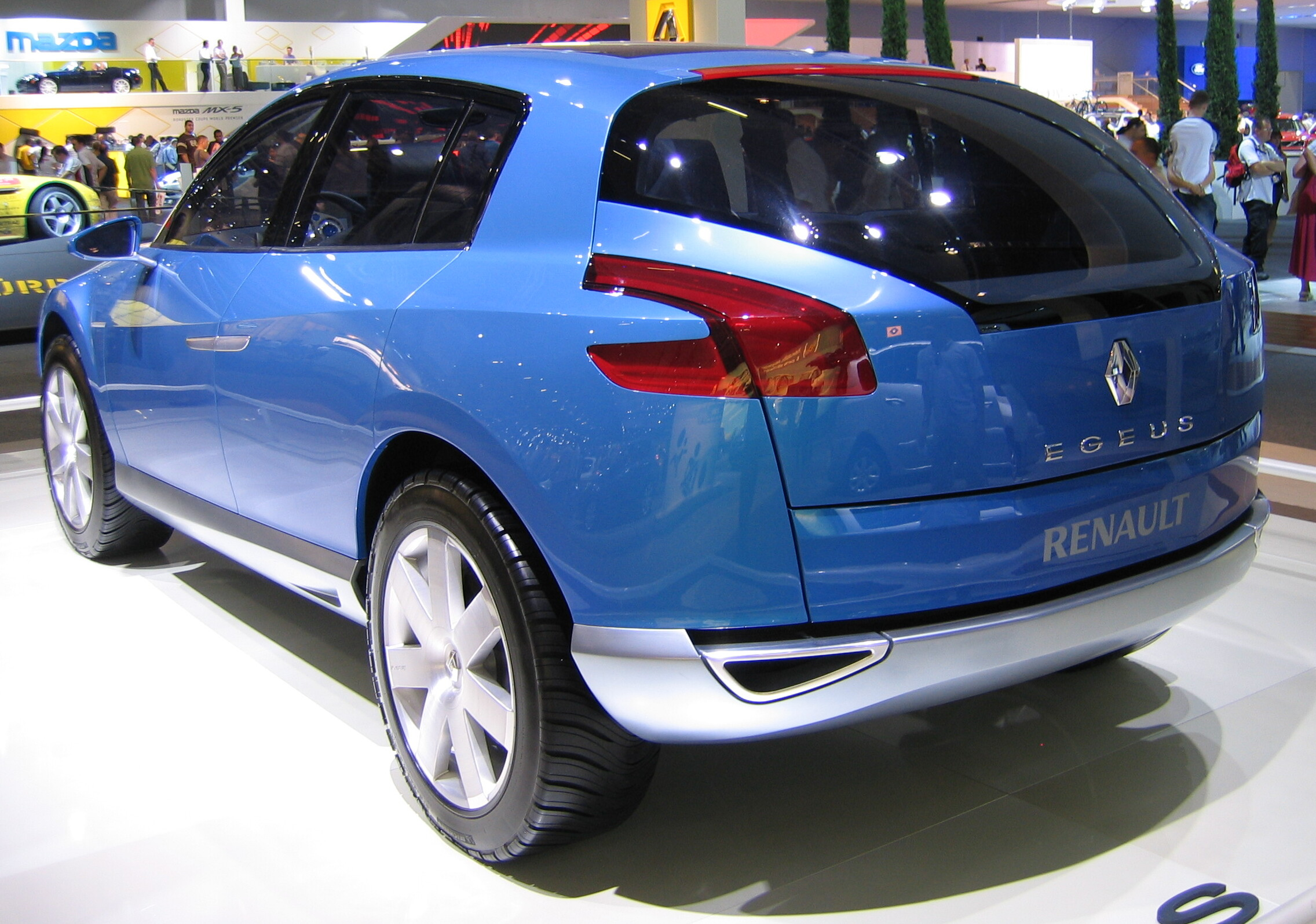
Renault Egeus at the 2006 British International Motor Show
