= Renault Filante (concept) =

Concept car made by Renault

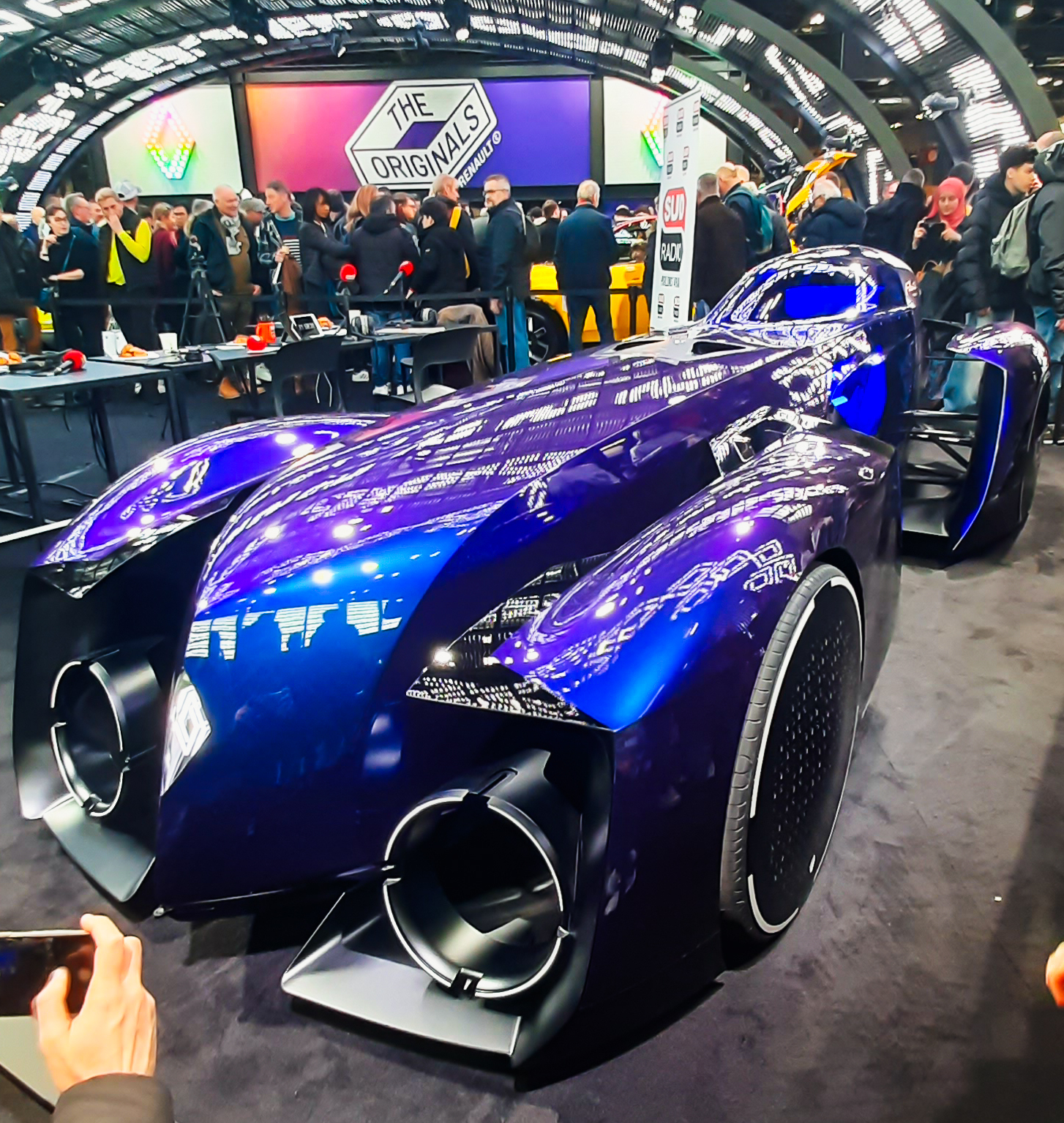

Overview
- Manufacturer: Renault
- Production: 2025

Body and chassis
- Class: Concept car

Dimensions
- Length: 5,120 mm (201.6 in)
- Width: 1,710 mm (67.3 in)
- Height: 1,110 mm (43.7 in)
- Curb weight: 1,000 kg (2,205 lb)

The Renault Filante is a fully electric concept car that was unveiled at the Rétromobile in Paris in early February 2025. The car's name is a reference to the Étoile Filante, a gas turbine-powered record-breaking car in 1956.

== Overview ==
The Filante has a length of 5.12 m (16.8 ft) and a height of 1.19 m (3 ft 11 in). Its design is intended to evoke aircraft, featuring, for example, the upward-opening dome of the driver's cabin and exposed screws. The paintwork appears blue or violet depending on the light and viewing angle. Lightweight materials such as an aluminum alloy and carbon fiber reinforced plastic ("Carbon") were used in the car's construction. The seat consists of carbon fiber reinforced plastic supports and a canvas covering. As a result, the vehicle weighs only 1000 kg despite a 600 kg, 87 kWh battery. Michelin developed tires with very low rolling resistance for the Filante's narrow, 19-inch wheels. Braking and steering are electrically controlled (brake-by-wire, steer-by-wire).
