= Renault E-Space =

Overview
- Manufacturer: Renault

Body and chassis
- Class: Concept car
- Body style: 5-door minivan
- Platform: RGEV Medium 2.0
- Doors: Conventional doors (front); Coach doors (rear)

Dimensions
- Length: 4,700 mm (185.0 in)
- Width: 2,002 mm (78.8 in)
- Height: 1,670 mm (65.7 in)

Chronology
- Predecessor: Renault Espace (spiritual)

The Renault E-Space is a concept car developed by Renault. It was presented on 12 October 2026 at the 2026 Paris Motor Show. While it is officially listed as a concept, a production model is being considered.

== Background ==
Throughout the first four generations from 1984 to 2015, the Renault Espace was a large MPV, before switching to a crossover MPV bodystyle for its fifth generation and a mid-size SUV for its sixth generation. The E-Space concept is designed and positioned as a spiritual successor to the original MPV models, with Renault describing it as a "future-focused vision of the original". Its name being a wordplay of "Espace".

It was previewed with one exterior image on 6 October 2026, a week before its full debut.

== Design ==
Side view

The E-Space concept features a retro design inspired by that of old Espace models, with shared design elements such as the forward-angled grille and thick D-pillar. It is described to have a one-box "monovolume" design, featuring a wedge-shaped front end and a similar "TGV train" profile to its spiritual predecessors. It features conventional doors in the front and rear-hinged coach doors in the rear, with no B-pillar in between. It also uses 23-inch wheels.

=== Interior ===
The interior dominantly features Renault's new OpenR Panorama layout, including a 1.13 m (44 in) wide display across the upper section of the dashboard, with another touchscreen display mounted closer within the driver's reach. According to Renault, this display setup will be featured in the next-generation Scenic and Rafale. It has a three-row six-seat configuration, with rotatable "floating" seats inspired by art deco design. Second row seats are offered with a tray table and 12.3-inch entertainment displays mounted on the front seat backs. They can also fold fully flat, acting as a workspace or table for the third row. Within the central spine running the length of the vehicle is a remote-controlled console with a small refrigerator and video game controllers.

== Specifications ==
The E-Space concept uses lithium iron phosphate (LFP) batteries and cell-to-pack technology, integrating the battery cells into the main battery pack without an intermediate module layer.
