= Renault Racoon =

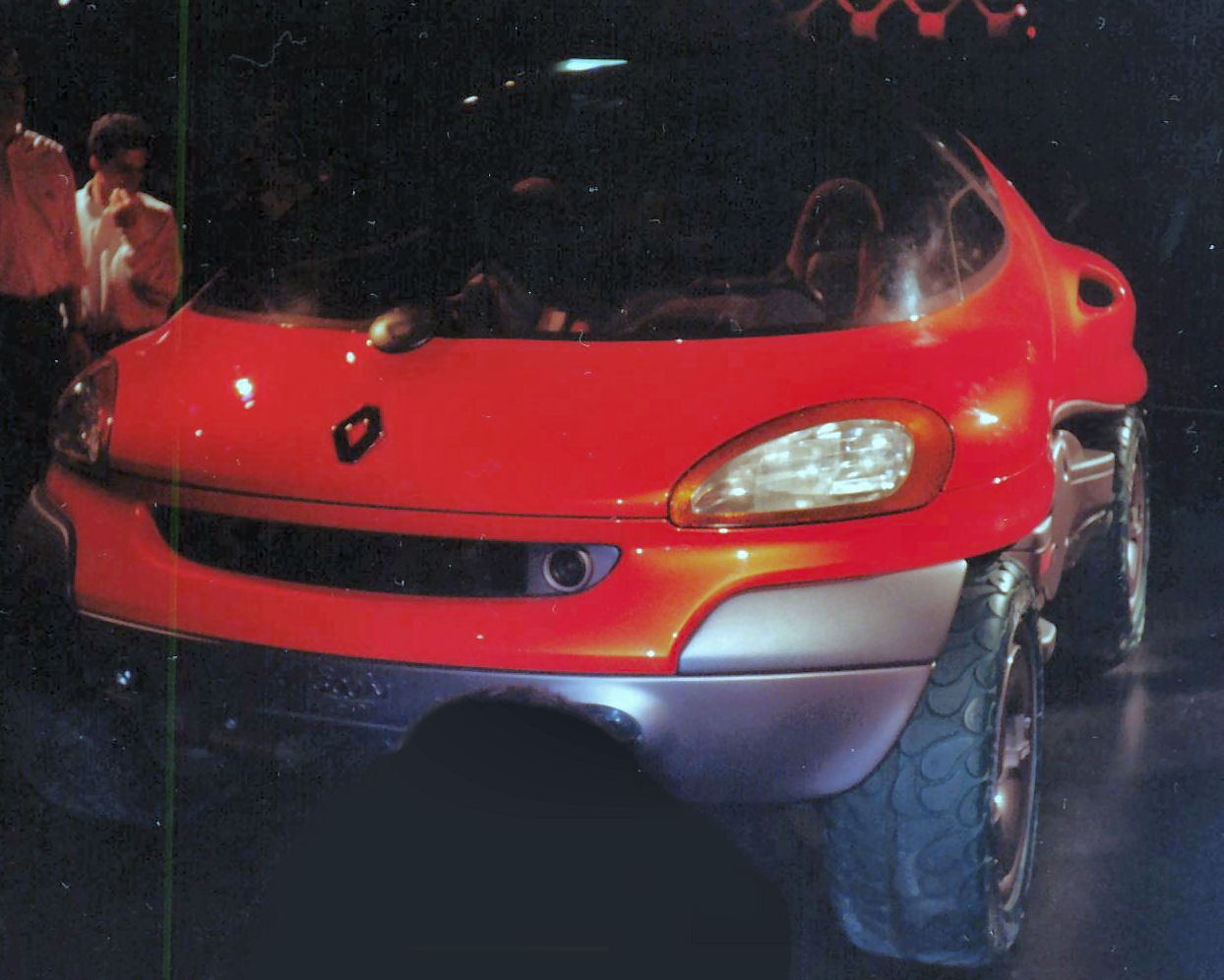

Overview
- Manufacturer: Renault
- Production: 1992
- Designer: Patrick Le Quément

Body and chassis
- Class: Concept car
- Layout: AWD
- Doors: Canopy

Powertrain
- Engine: 2.96 L twin-turbocharged V6
- Transmission: 6-speed manual

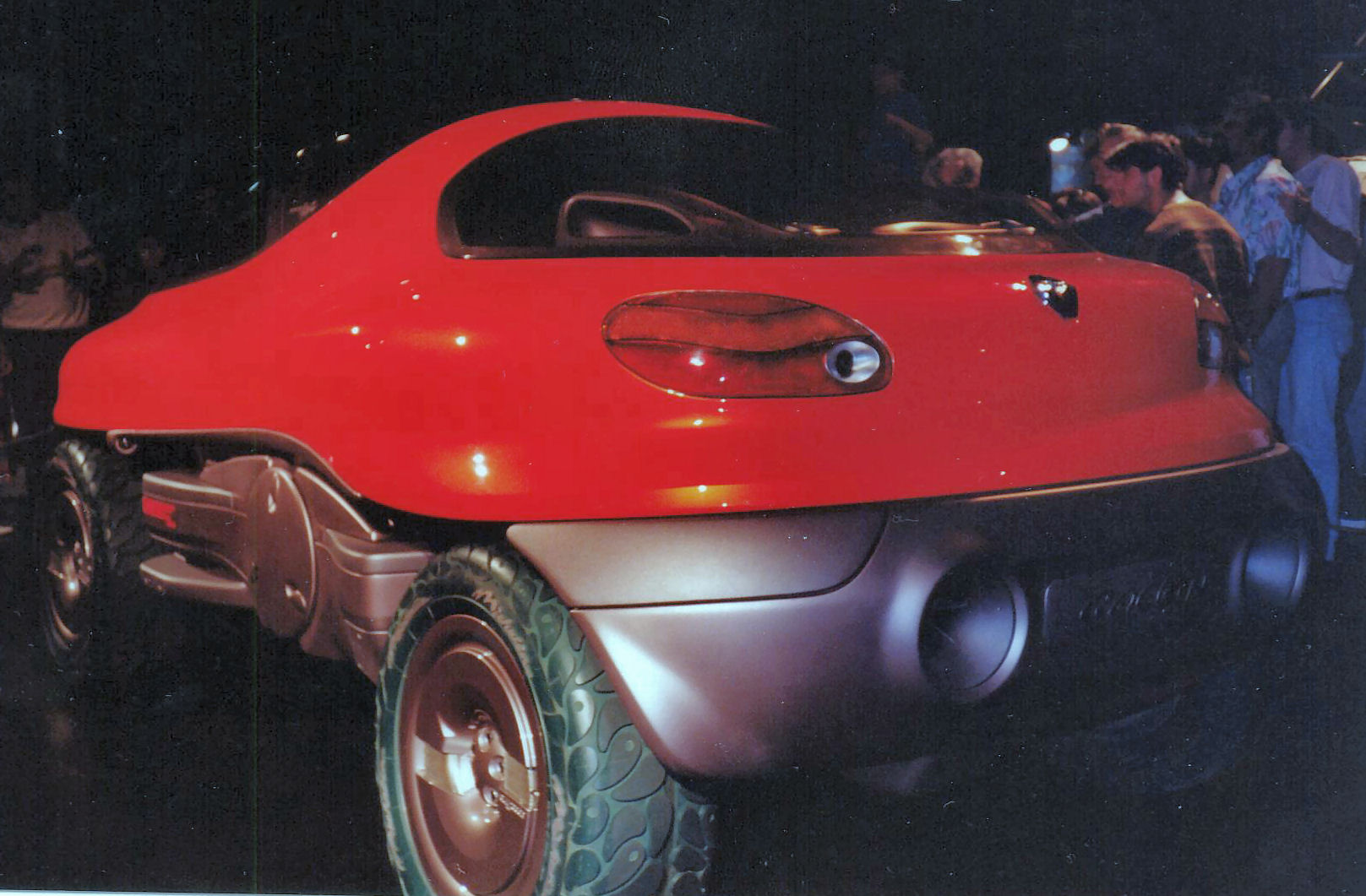
Rear view

The Renault Racoon is a concept car created by Renault, first shown in 1992.

The Racoon used a twin-turbocharged V6 engine of 2963 cc, a six-speed manual transmission and an all wheel drive system. It produced 193 kW (262 bhp) of power at 6,000 rpm and 363 Nm (37 mkg) of torque at 2,500 rpm.

== Overview ==
To enter the Racoon, the driver had to open a canopy door. The car had seating space for three passengers and luggage. The vehicle was also aquatic-capable. The Racoon could be raised upwards to provide additional ground clearance. The construction of its suspension meant this was achieved with a levered effect.

The car also had new features such as rain-diffusing glass, remote-controlled entry, computer control, satellite navigation, and cameras as opposed to rearview mirrors. While these technologies have become much more affordable and reliable, at the time of its launch most of this technology was still in its infancy.

The Renault Racoon's industrial designer was Patrick Le Quément.
