= Renault EZ =

Electric car series

The Renault EZ is a series of electric, autonomous and connected concept cars introduced by Renault through 2018 aimed at highlighting new potential directions for the automotive industry and some future styling cues of the Renault marque.

== Models ==
=== Renault EZ-GO ===
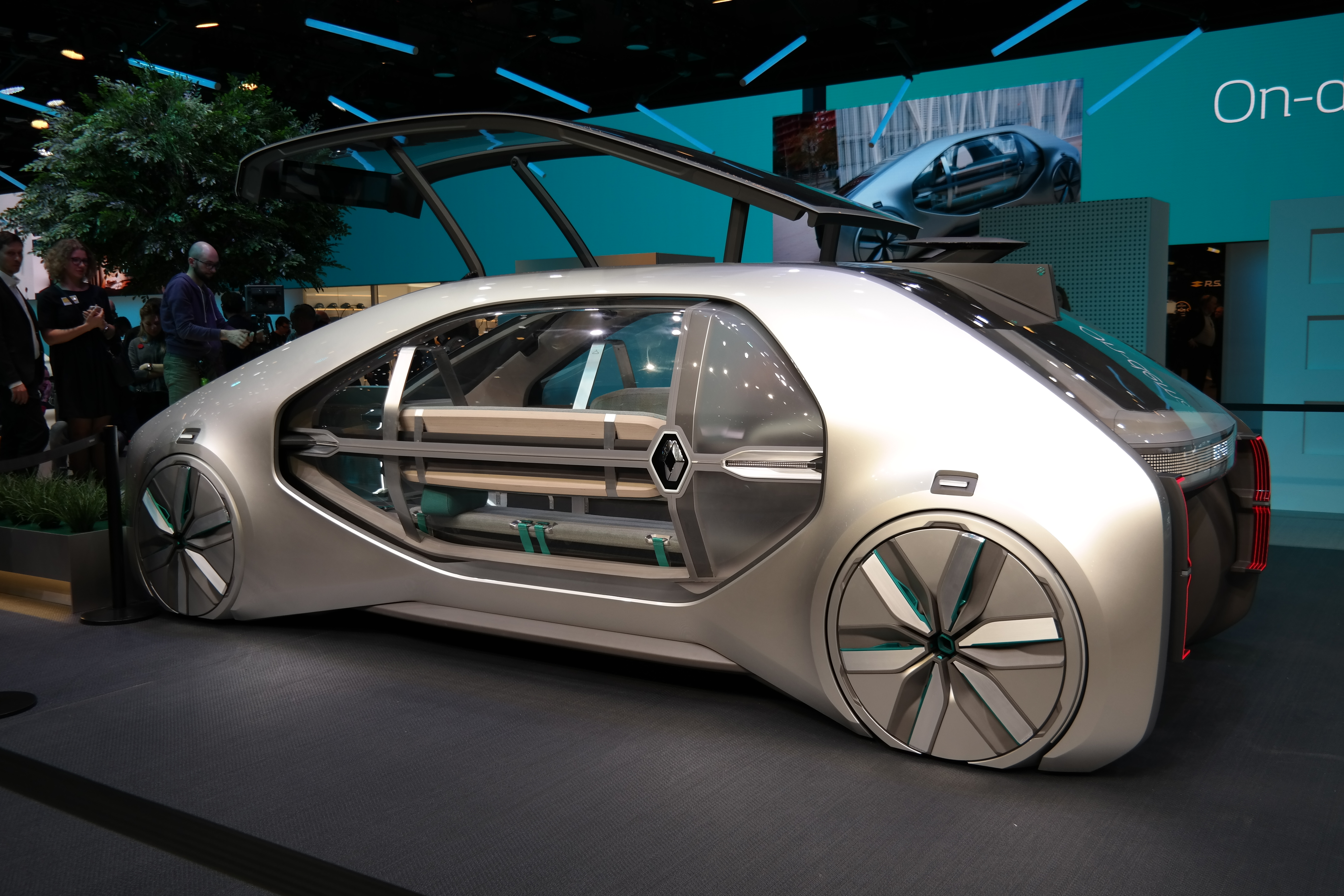
Renault EZ-GO

The Renault EZ-GO is an electric robo-taxi concept. It was introduced at the 2018 Geneva Motor Show. The car is powered by an electric motor located on the rear axle. It has a maximum speed limited to 50 km/h (31 mph) and a four-wheel steering to ease urban transit. Its length is about 5,200 mm (200 in) and the passengers (up to six) are in a U-shaped seat row. The glass roof opens from the front and there is a ramp, both features conceived for facilitating access.

According to the Renault design boss Laurens van den Acker, the car was made to look deliberately different from other Renault, as its aim was to appeal to fleet customers such as cities or hotels. He said the design team took inspiration from the taxis of New York and London to create an "iconic" design, albeit more modern. The production version of the car may be launched by 2030.

=== Renault EZ-PRO ===
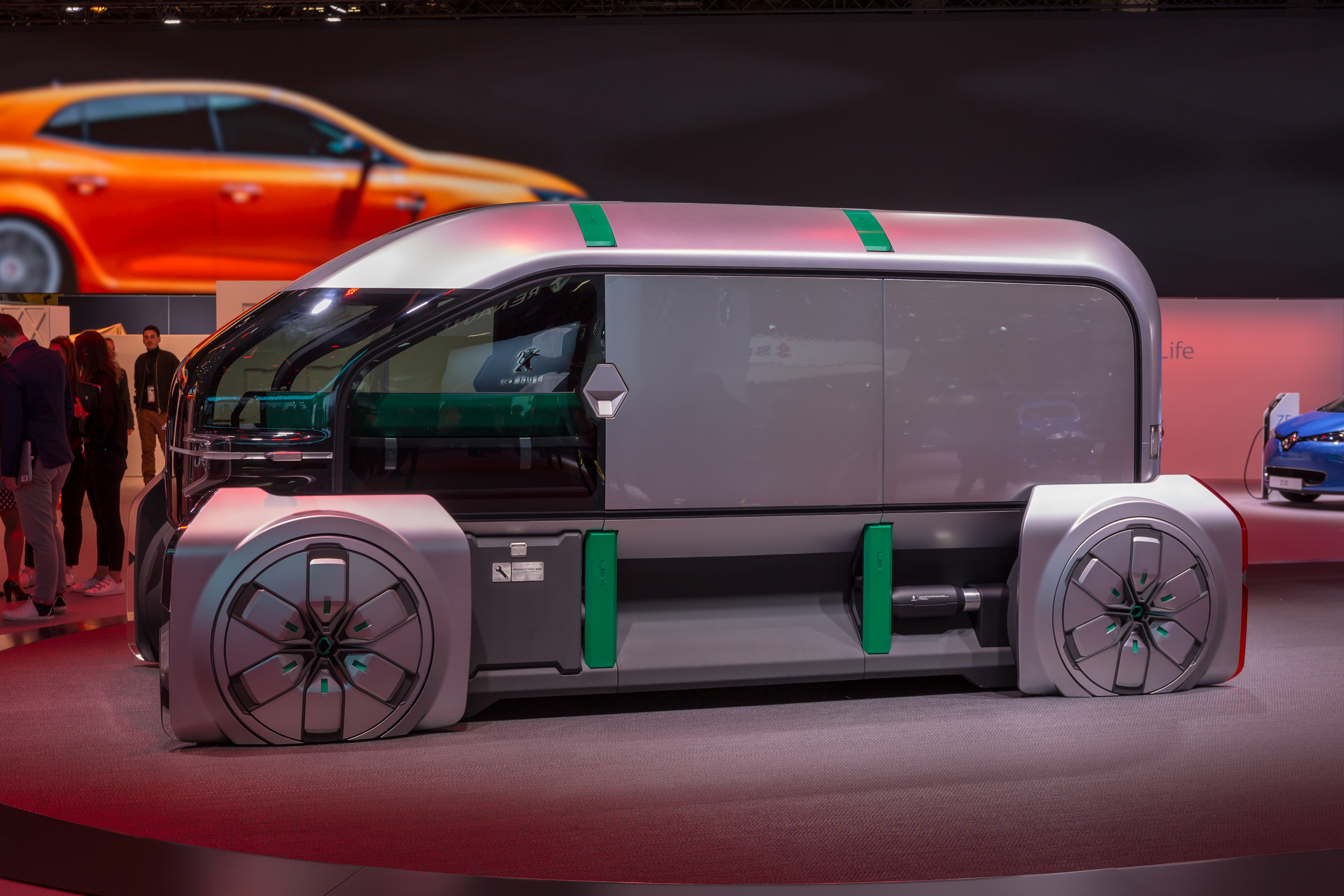
Renault EZ-PRO leading pod

The Renault EZ-PRO is an electric and autonomous light commercial vehicle concept for urban delivery unveiled at the 2018 IAA Commercial Vehicle Show. The concept is made up of several independent units called "pods". The leading pod has a person on board that can take control of all of them through a joystick if needed. The design is meant to produce little disruption in an urban environment. The pods are powered by rear-axle electric motors and have a four-wheel steering system. As with the EZ-GO, a market launch is possible by 2030.

=== Renault EZ-ULTIMO ===
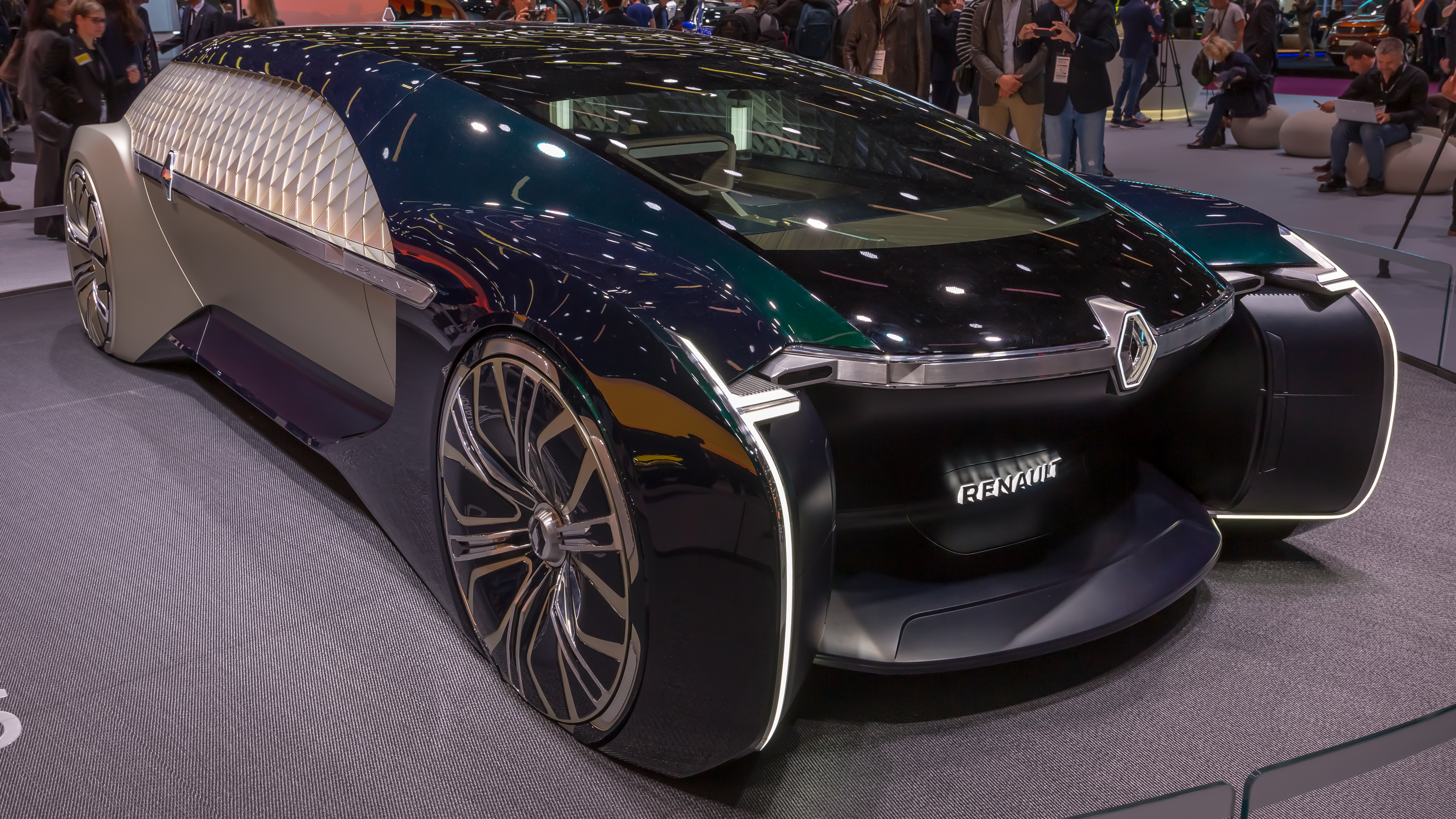
Renault EZ-ULTIMO

The Renault EZ-ULTIMO is an electric and autonomous luxury car unveiled at the 2018 Paris Motor Show. The car has an electric motor powering the front axle and a range is about 500 km (310 mi) on a full battery charge. It has a four-wheel steering system and a length of 5,800 mm (230 in). The access is through a side door and the roof opens from the front to facilitate it. The lounge-like interior has three velvet-covered armchairs and uses materials such as marble and wood parquetry. The interior design cues are inspired by the pre-WWII Renault luxury cars, as part of the celebrations for the 120th anniversary of the Renault marque.
