= Renault Be Bop =

Renault Be Bop Sport & Renault Be Bop SUV

Overview
- Manufacturer: Renault
- Production: 2003
- Designer: Michel Jardin

Body and chassis
- Class: Concept car
- Body style: MPV and SUV

Powertrain
- Engine: 1.6 L, 2.0 L

The Renault Be Bop is a concept car designed by Renault for the 2003 Frankfurt Motor Show. The name has been re-used for versions of the unrelated Renault Kangoo.

There are two versions of the Be Bop; a sport oriented MPV with a 2.0-litre four-cylinder turbocharged engine producing 225 bhp (168 kW; 228 PS) and front wheel drive and a SUV version with a smaller 1.6-litre four-cylinder engine producing 115 bhp (86 kW; 117 PS) from the Renault Mégane with a new six-speed clutchless manual gearbox and an electronic coupling system linking the front and rear wheels. The two variations share 50% of their body components.
