= Renault Sport Spider =

Overview
- Manufacturer: Renault Sport
- Also called: Renault Spider
- Production: 1996–1999
- Assembly: France: Dieppe, Seine-Maritime (Alpine)
- Designer: Patrick Le Quément

Body and chassis
- Class: Sports car
- Body style: 2-door roadster
- Layout: RMR layout
- Doors: Scissor

Powertrain
- Engine: 1,998 cc F7R 16-valve I4
- Transmission: 5-speed manual

Dimensions
- Wheelbase: 2,343 mm (92.2 in)
- Length: 3,795 mm (149.4 in)
- Width: 1,830 mm (72.0 in)
- Height: 1,250 mm (49.2 in)
- Curb weight: 930–965 kg (2,050–2,127 lb)

The Renault Sport Spider is a roadster produced by the French automaker Renault Sport, a subsidiary of Renault, between 1996 and 1999.

== Project ==
The idea for the Renault Spider was formulated in the early 1990s: in the midst of a revival after a difficult second half of the 1980s, Renault wanted a car to promote it as a sporting brand (similar to the Renault 5 Turbo from a decade earlier). The Spider was intended to both serve as a racing car, in a one-make series organized by Renault, and as a road car. The first prototypes for Project W94, as it was known at the time, were completed in mid-1994 and a concept version was presented to the public at the Geneva Motor Show a year later. The car went on sale in early 1996, assembled at the Alpine factory in Dieppe. Left hand drive versions were first produced with an aeroscreen device the same as the race cars. In 1997, a version with a full glass windscreen and wiper was made available.

Approximately 1640 cars were produced through 1999, with the addition of around 80 race only versions. The UK market only imported the windscreen version and 60 right hand drive cars were produced for the UK and Japan. The naturally aspirated 2-litre F7R engine produces 150 PS (110 kW; 148 hp).

Although it was built by Alpine in Dieppe, the Spider was the first ever road car badged as a Renault Sport and this Brand name has used for all high performance Renault cars until 2021, when the Renault Sport brand was replaced again by the Alpine brand including a rebranding of Renault's Formula 1 team.

== Features ==
Designed from the outset as a driver's car, the chassis was made of aluminium for its combination of low weight and substantial strength, while the actual bodywork is a plastic composite. Unusually, the Spider did not have a roof, either folding or hard-top. The gearbox and the engine were one unit transversally fixed in an oscillating hinge (an arrangement inspired by aeronautical design), which all but eradicated the interference of engine vibration with the chassis, and the pedals of the Spider were adjustable as well as the seat so the driver could achieve a better driving position. Power for the Spider came from a version of the 2-litre F7R engine from the Clio Williams and Mégane Coupe, producing 150 PS (110 kW; 148 hp). A windscreen model (965 kg) and a wind deflector model (930 kg) were available - the driver wearing a helmet in vehicles without a windscreen.

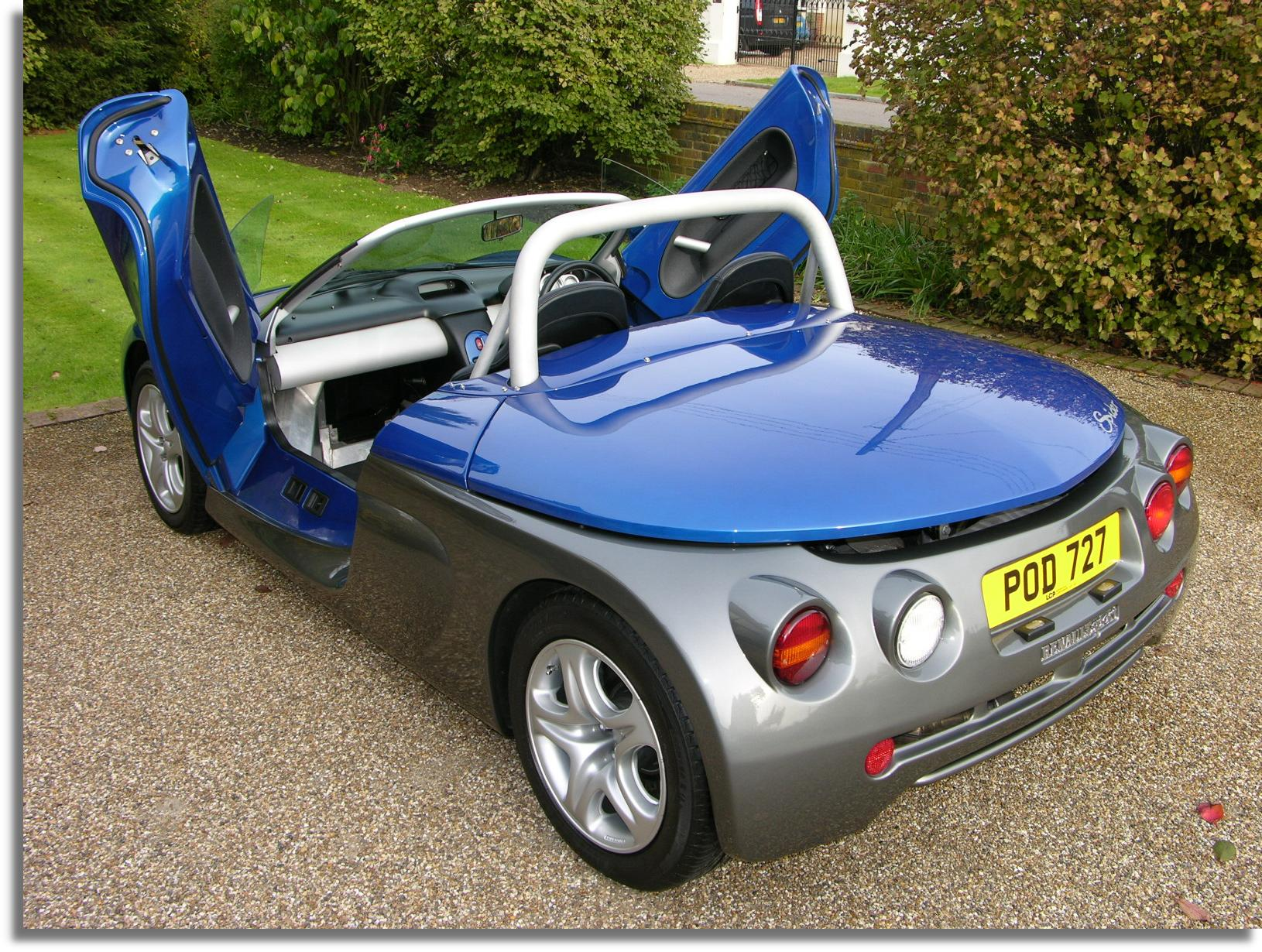
Rear view (UK)

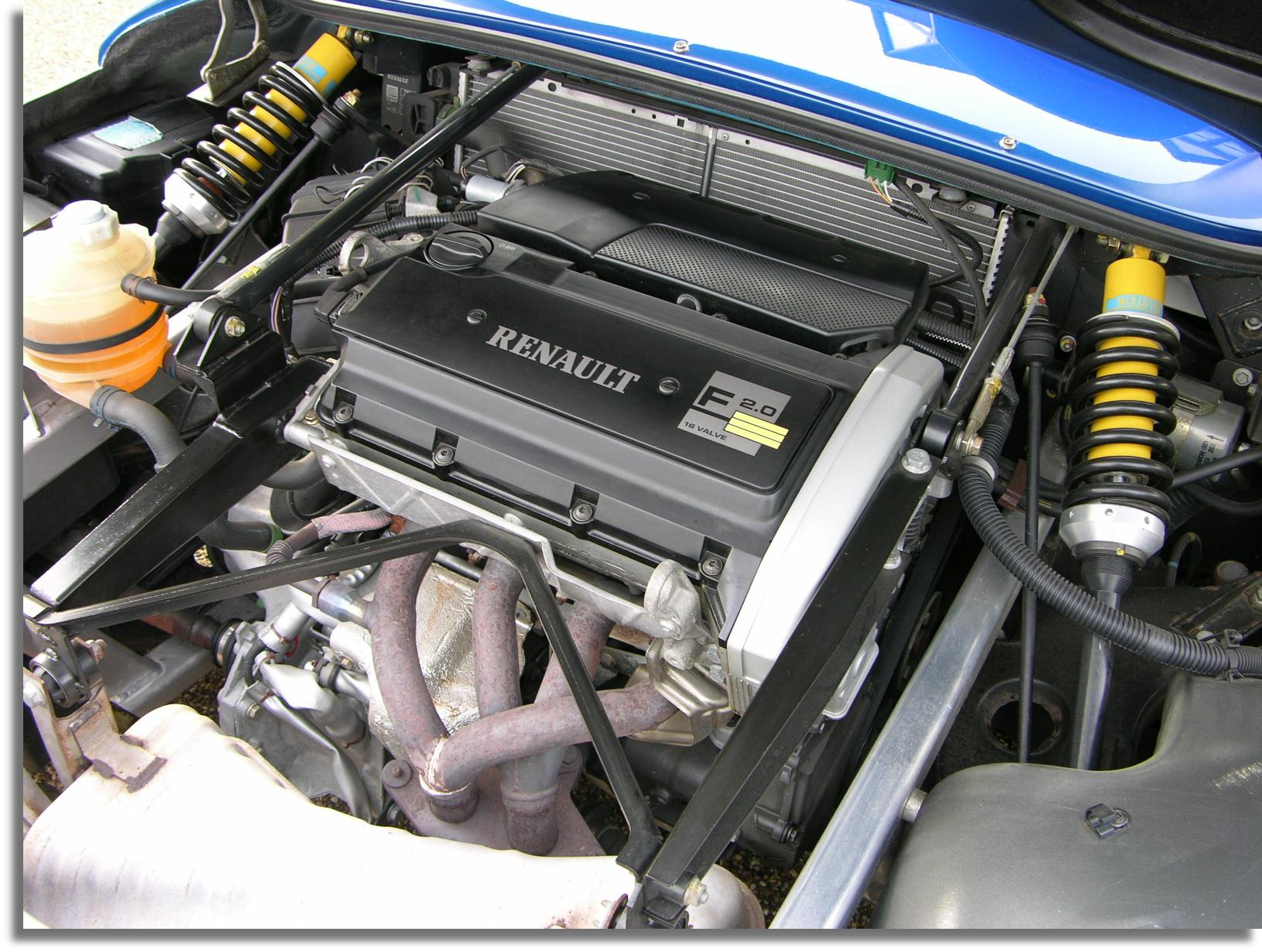
2-litre F7R engine

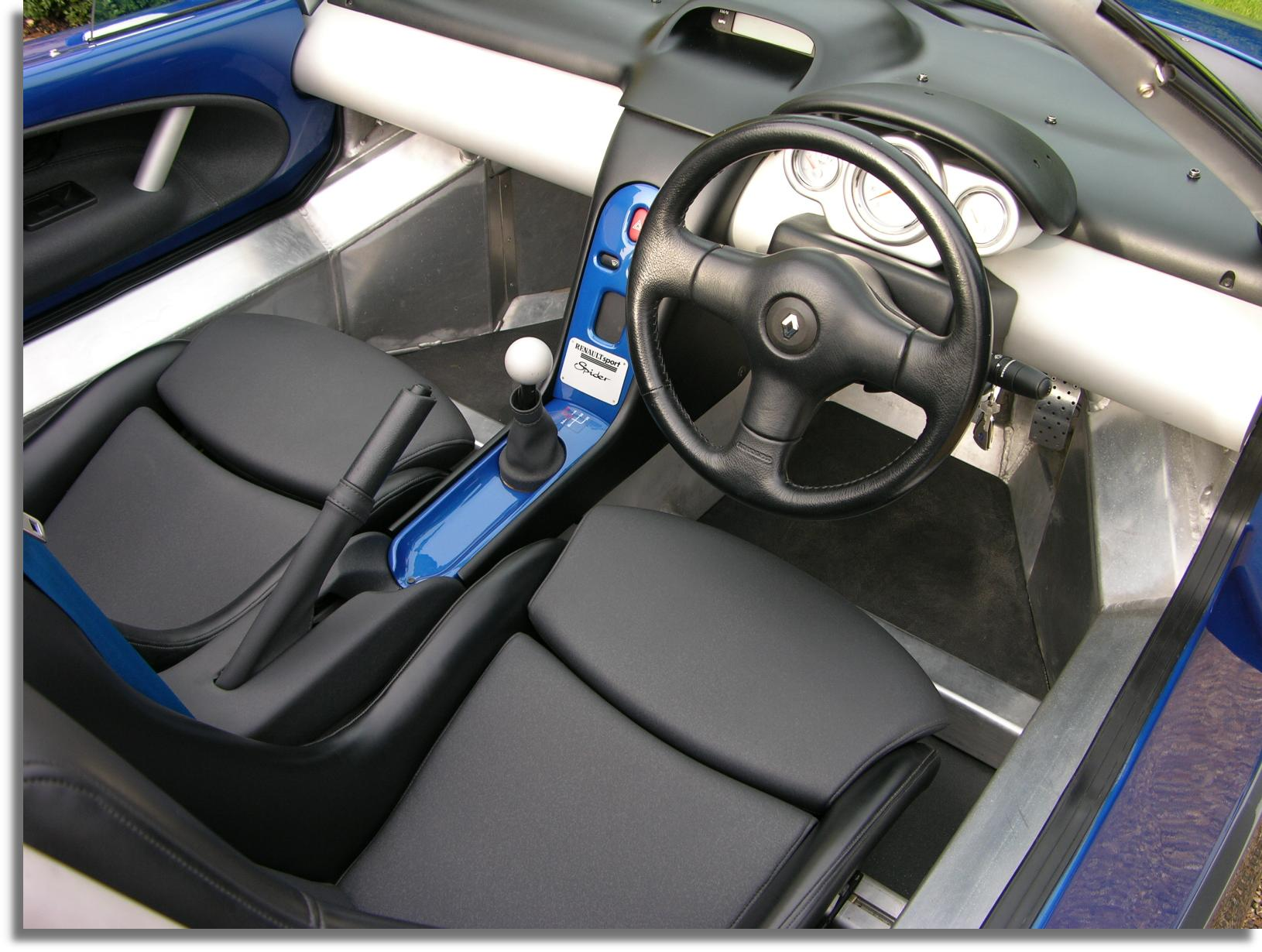
Interior (UK)

== Spider in motorsport ==
Renault Sport Spider
- Category: One-make racing
- Country: United Kingdom
- Inaugural season: 1995
- Folded: 1999
- Constructors: Renault

From the outset the Spider was intended to be the basis for a new one-car racing series. Renault had been running these championships since the early 80s with the 5 Turbo, 21 Turbo, and Clio models. A special Spider Trophy edition was designed and built for the purpose, with the engine tuned to produce 180 bhp (134 kW). The Spider championships ran for several years as support series to larger championships such as the British Touring Car Championship (in which it is remembered for having produced one of that series' top drivers of recent years, Jason Plato, who won 11 out of 14 races in the inaugural year of the UK Spider Cup). In 1999 Andy Priaulx beat Plato's record of eight successive race wins in the Spiders by taking a clean sweep of 13 wins in all 13 races. He also qualified for each one on pole position and took fastest laps in all but two of the events.

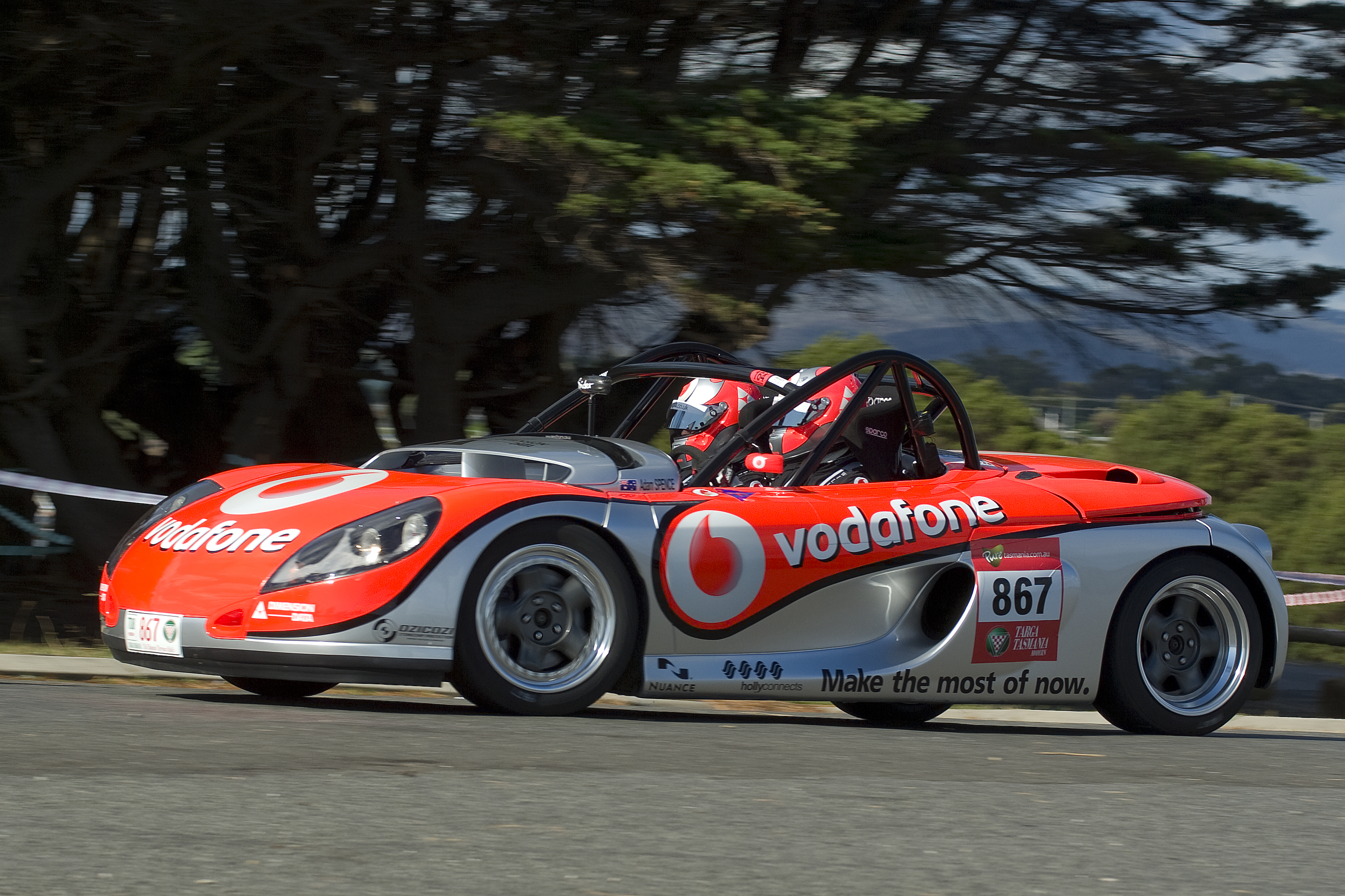
Renault Sport Spider Targa Tasmania 2008

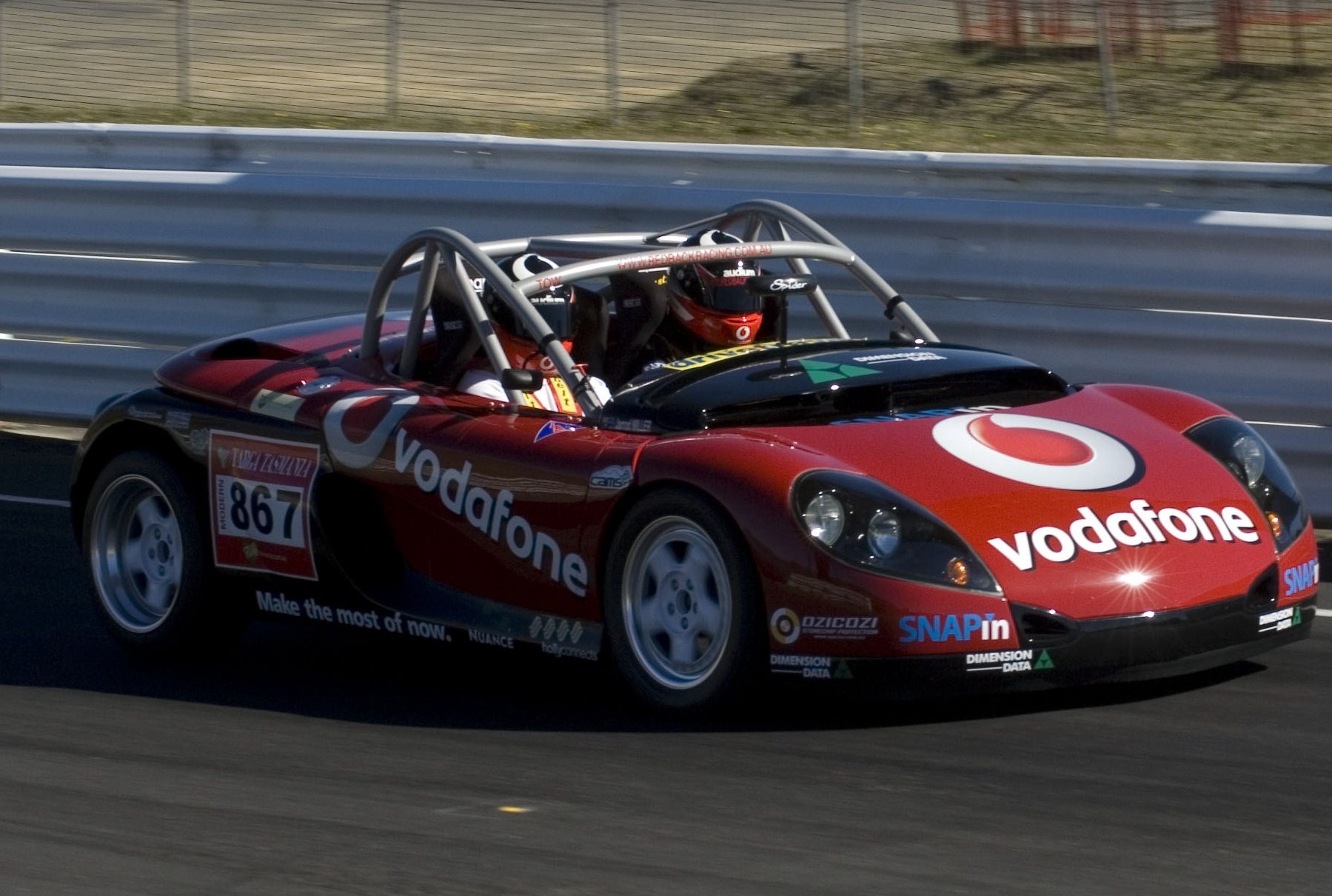
Renault Sport Spider Targa Tasmania 2007

=== Motorsport specification ===
- Power: 143.9 kW (193.0 bhp) @ 6000 rpm, torque 184.4 Nm (136.0 lb·ft) @ 4500 rpm
- Redline: 6800 rpm
- Weight: 854 kg (1,883 lb)
- Front brakes: 300 mm (12 in), front wheels 40.6 cm × 20.3 cm (16.0 in × 8.0 in), tire size 205/50VR-16
- Rear brakes: 310 mm (12 in), rear wheels 40.6 cm × 22.9 cm (16.0 in × 9.0 in), tire size 225/50VR-16
- Transmission: 6-speed Sadev sequential
- Top speed: ~251 km/h (156 mph), 0–100 km/h (0–62 mph) ~5.8 seconds, 1/4 mile ~14.1 seconds
