= Renault Trezor =

Two-seater electric concept car built by Renault

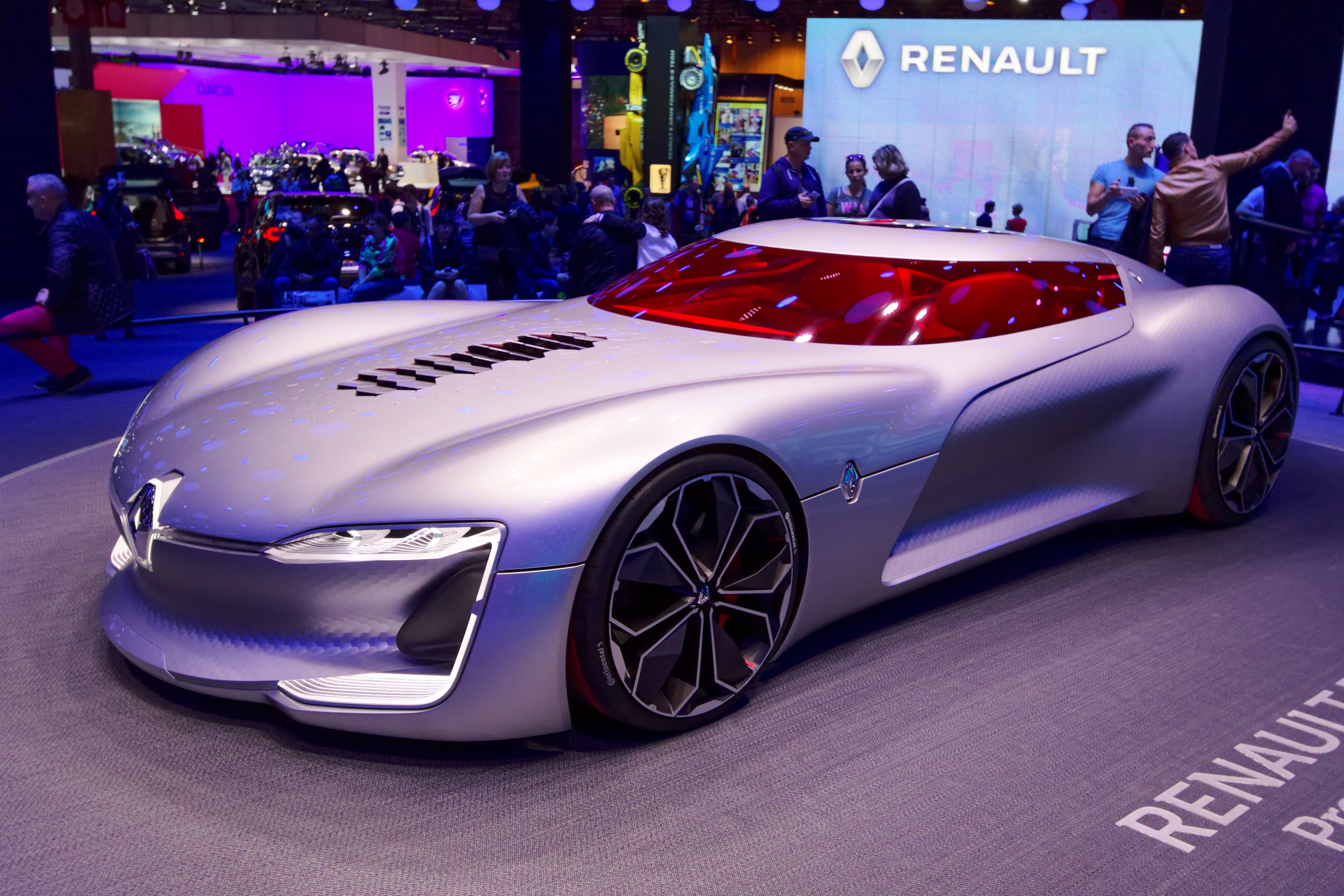

Overview
- Manufacturer: Renault
- Production: 2016
- Designer: Laurens van den Acker

Body and chassis
- Class: Concept car
- Layout: Mid-mounted
- Doors: Canopy

Powertrain
- Electric motor: McLaren Electronic Systems Motor Generator Unit
- Transmission: 5-speed Hewland sequential paddle shift
- Battery: 28kWh Li-ion by Williams Advanced Engineering

Dimensions
- Wheelbase: 2,776 mm (109.3 in)
- Length: 4,700 mm (185.0 in)
- Width: 2,100 mm (82.7 in)
- Height: 1,080 mm (42.5 in)
- Kerb weight: 1,600 kg (3,527 lb)

Chronology
- Predecessor: Renault DeZir

The Renault Trezor is a two-seater electric concept car with autonomous capabilities built by Renault which was unveiled at the 2016 Paris Motor Show. The car secured the Festival Automobile International's Most Beautiful Concept car of the Year 2016 award. The car was expected to become a commercial product by 2020.

== Exterior ==
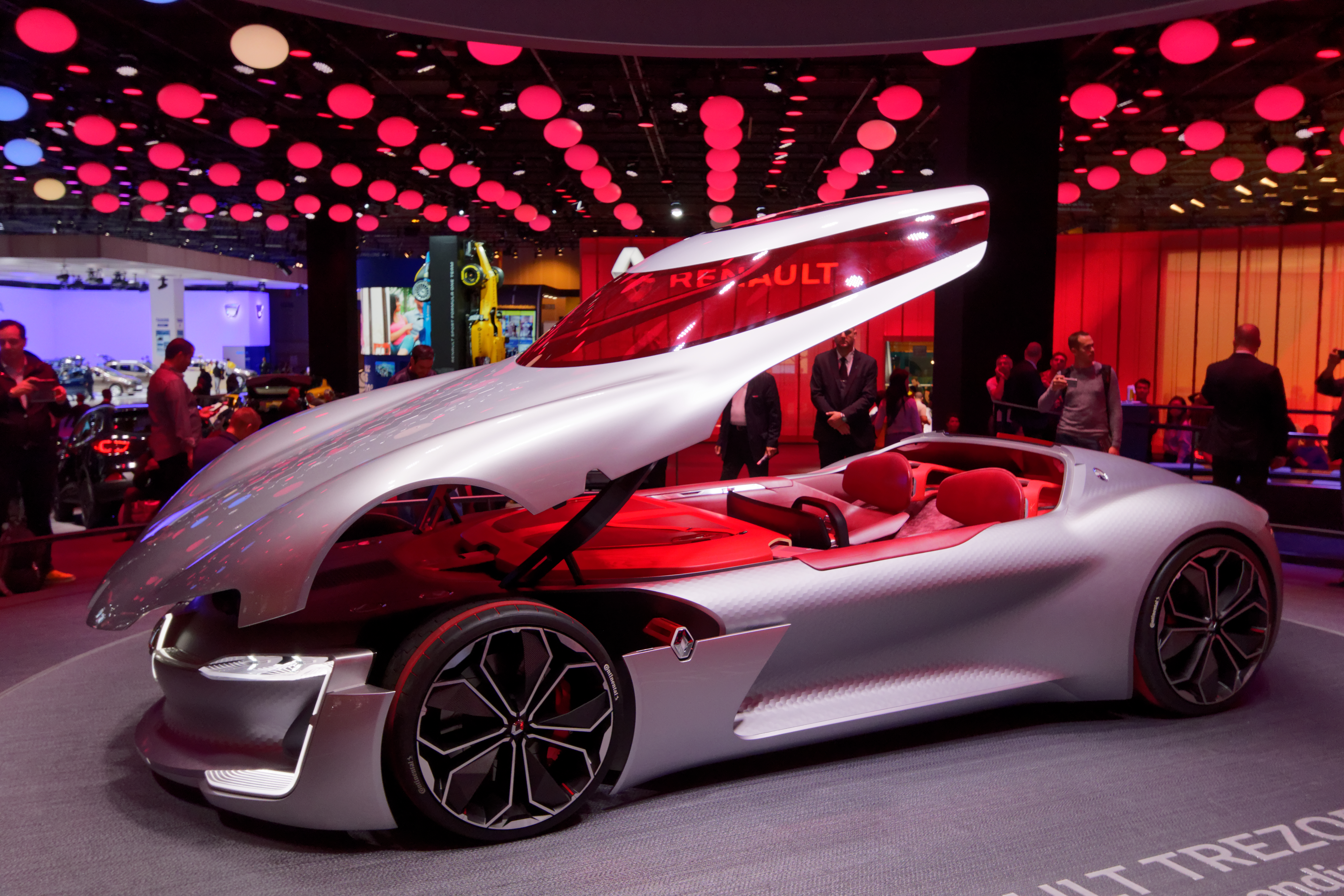
The Renault Trezor with its roof open

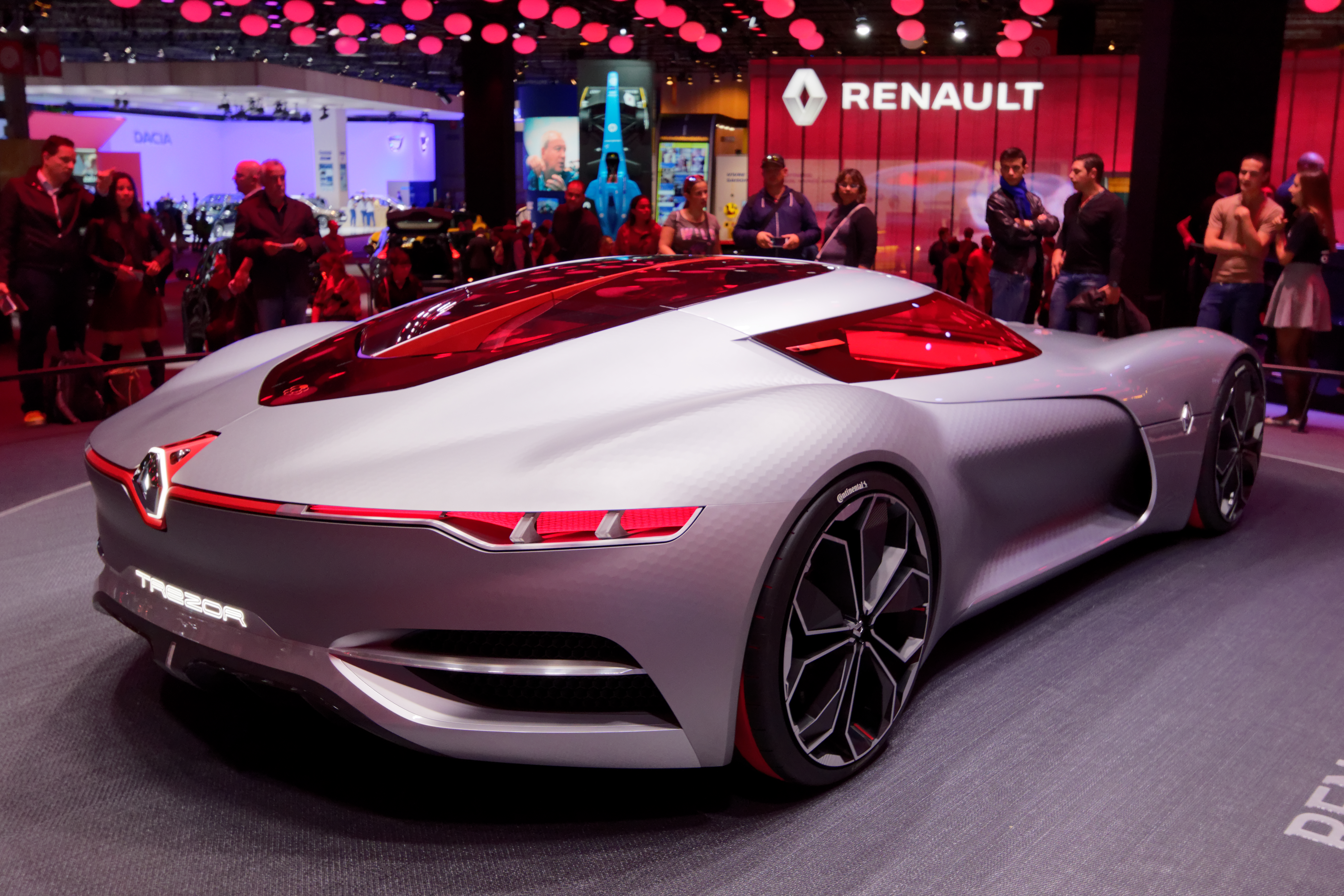
Renault Trezor rear

The car's lack of visible seams is largely due to the use of its clamshell style roof which opens up to allow passengers to enter the interior. The single piece canopy opens by hinging forward on struts. The car also uses a carbon-fiber chassis and a wooden frame under the bonnet, which was built with German bicycle manufacturer Keim, to function as a luggage rack. It had to carry on the legacy of the DeZir, extreme beauty and economy while sacrificing top speed. The car has a drag coefficient of 0.22 which makes it one of the most aerodynamically efficient cars in the world. The exterior lighting signature of the car changes when switched to autonomous mode. The car rides on 21 inch front and 22 inch rear wheels with gaps between spokes in the shape of the Eiffel Tower, besides carbon-fiber scoops to aid in brake cooling.

== Interior ==
The car has an electric motor developing 260 kW (349 hp) and 380 N⋅m (280 lb⋅ft) torque, allowing the car to accelerate from 0 to 100 km/h (62 mph) in less than four seconds. The car has two battery packs with independent cooling systems optimized by variable geometry honeycomb shaped air intakes in front. The car has a brake operated energy recovery system, developed from the Rechargeable Energy Storage System (RESS) technology developed for Formula E cars.

The interior and the windshield of the car are colored red. The car also has an OLED touchscreen covered with Gorilla Glass on both the center console and steering wheel. The steering wheel is rectangular and can extend in width when the vehicle is in autonomous mode to give the driver a panoramic view of the dashboard.
