= Renault DeZir =

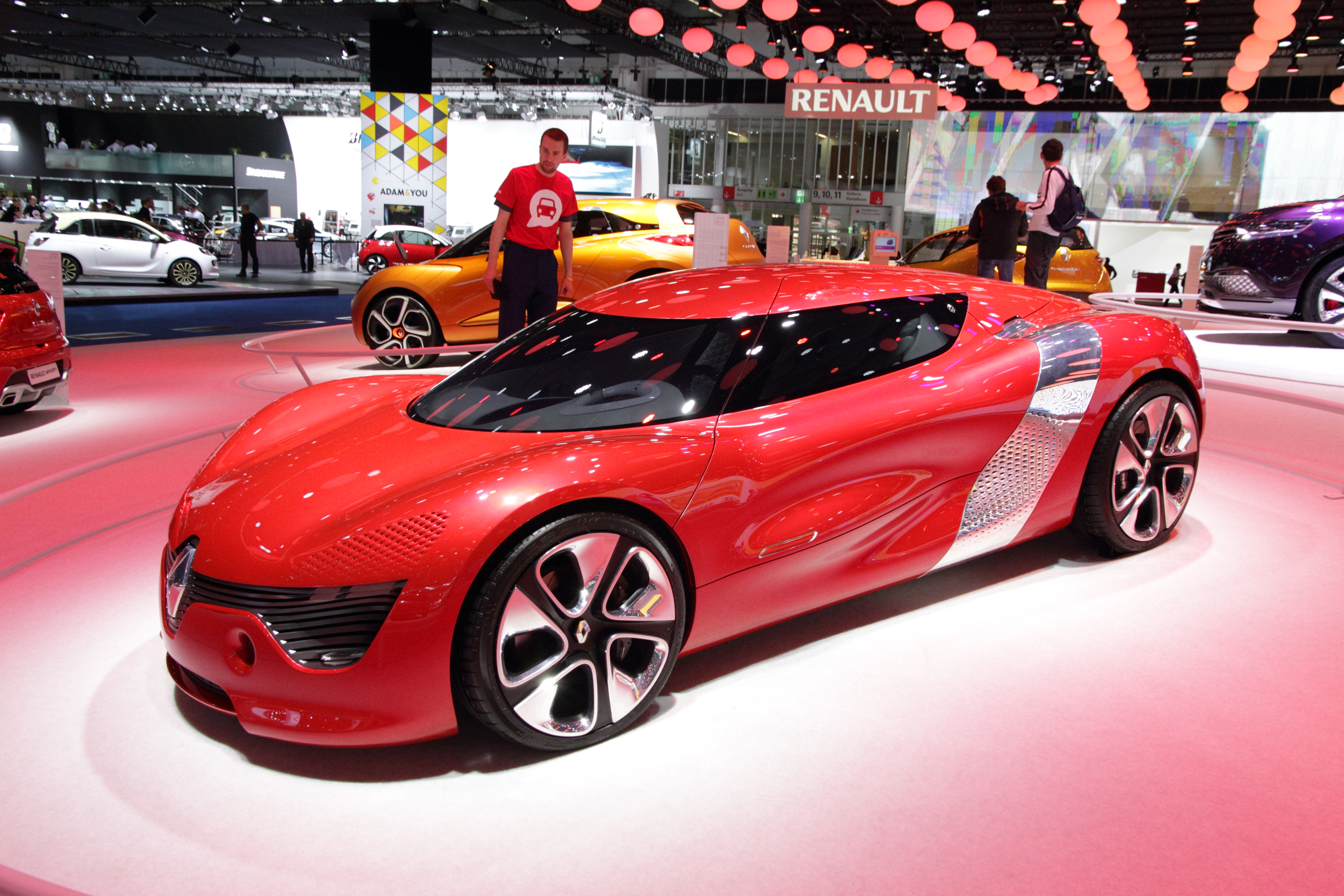

Overview
- Manufacturer: Renault
- Production: 2010 (Concept car)
- Designer: Laurens van den Acker

Body and chassis
- Class: Sports car (S)
- Body style: 2-door coupé
- Layout: Mid-motor, rear-wheel-drive
- Doors: Symmetrical Butterfly; Butterfly door (driver side); Suicide butterfly door (passenger side)
- Related: Renault Sport R.S. 01

Powertrain
- Engine: 148 hp electric motor
- Transmission: 6-speed automatic

Dimensions
- Curb weight: 1,830 lb (830 kg)

Chronology
- Successor: Renault Trezor

The Renault DeZir is a zero-emissions electric concept car that was first officially presented at the 2010 Paris Motor Show. The car is a 2-seat coupe with butterfly doors and the interior is finished in red leather. The concept butterfly doors open like a conventional butterfly door on the driver's side and a suicide door on the passenger's side.

== Performance ==
The DeZir is powered by a mid-mounted electric motor producing 148 hp (110 kW; 150 PS) and 226 N⋅m (167 lb⋅ft) of torque, with power sent to the rear wheels through an automatic transmission. Renault claims the DeZir can accelerate from 0-60 mph (0–97 km/h) in 5 seconds, with a governed top speed of 112 mph (180 km/h). Renault claims a range of 99 mi (159 km).

== Related cars ==
=== Renault Sport R.S. 01 ===
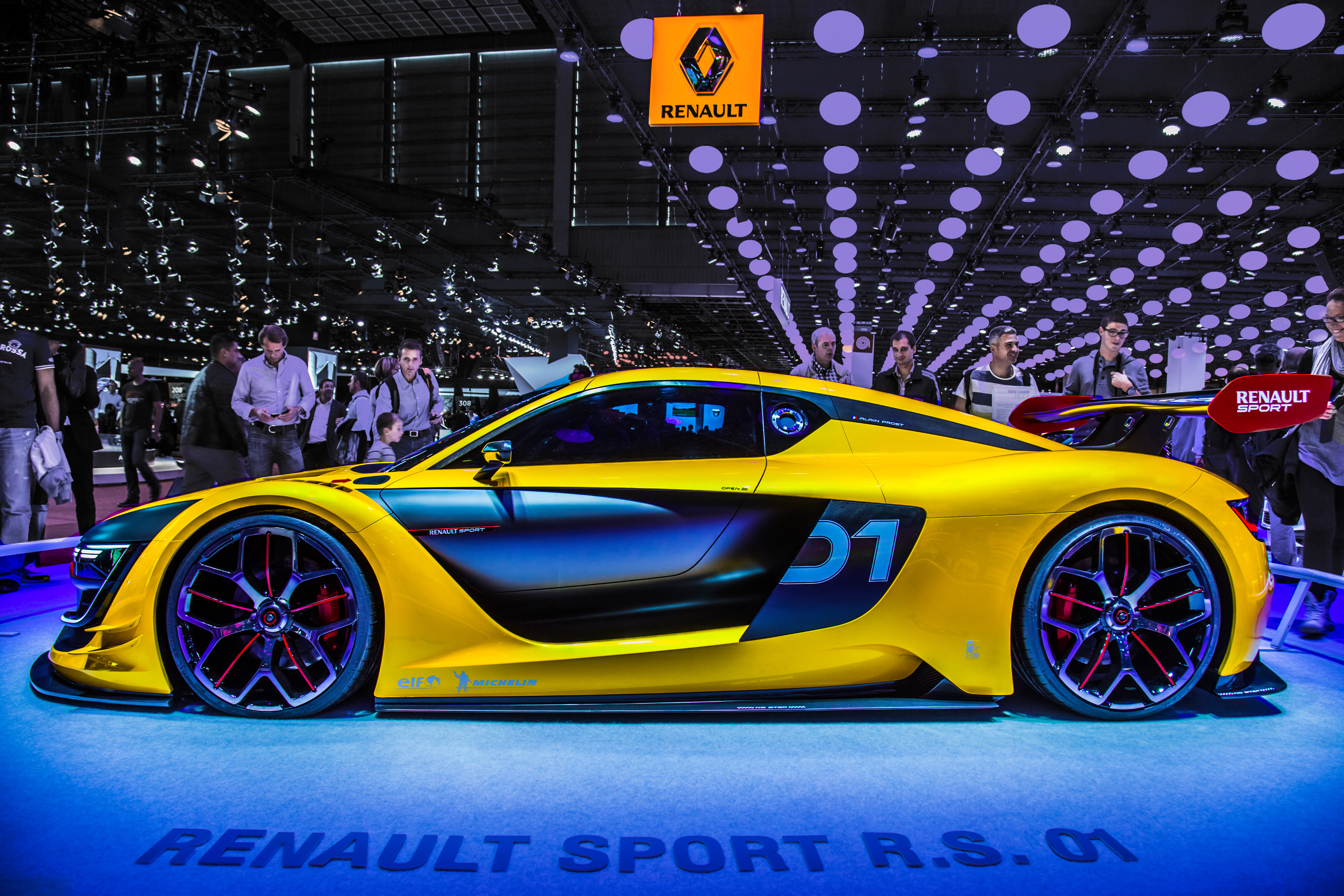
Renault Sport R.S. 01 at the 2014 Paris Motor Show

The Renault Sport R.S. 01 is a race car manufactured by Renault and is based on the DeZir. The car originally raced in Renault's own one-make series, the Renault Sport Trophy, and later raced in the Group GT3 classification.

Unlike the DeZir, the R.S. 01 has a petrol engine. It uses the 3.8-liter VR38DETT V6 by Nissan but has been slightly tuned by Nismo for track regulations, which can deliver up to 500 hp (373 kW; 507 PS) of power.

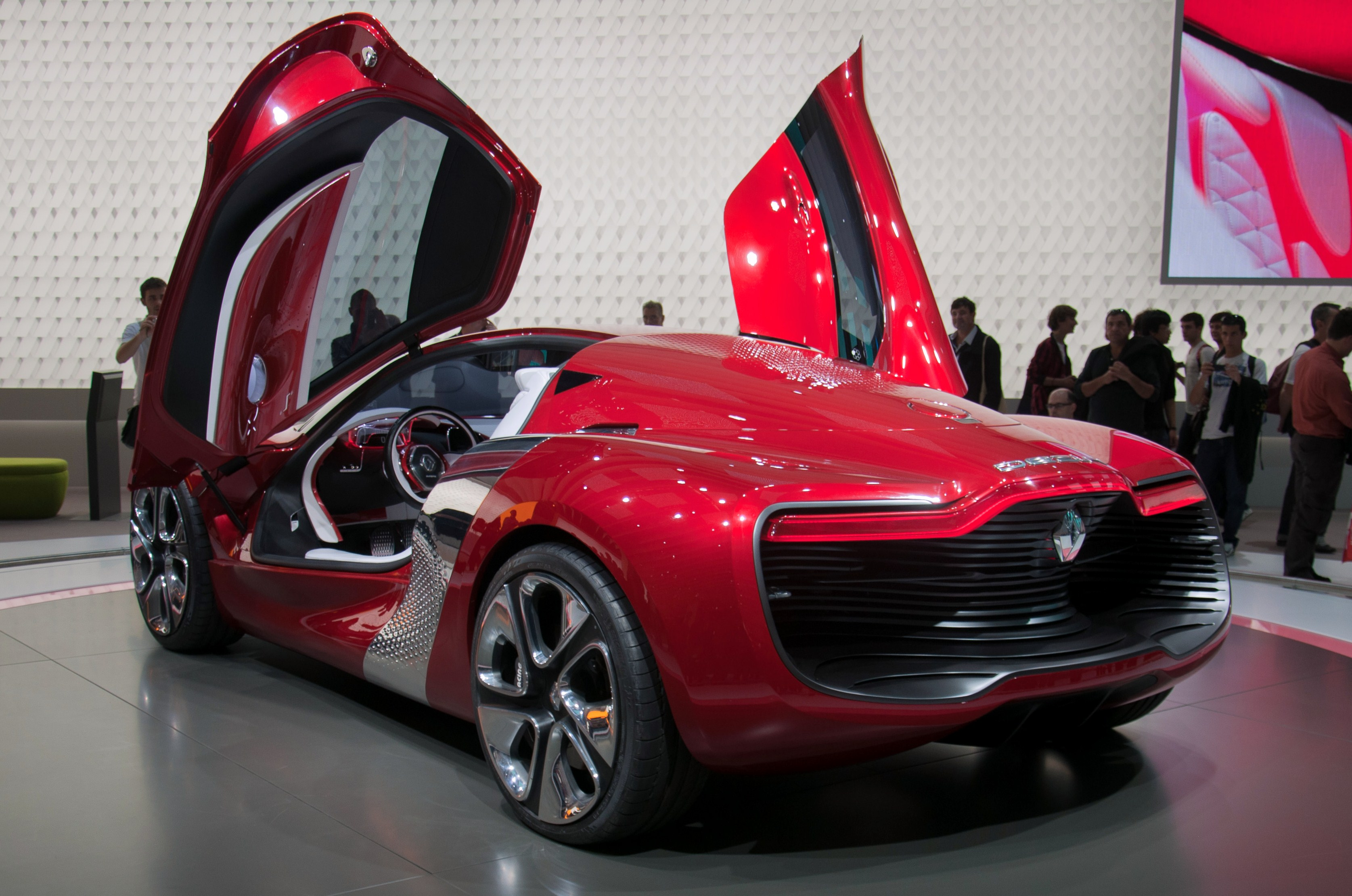
Renault DeZir rear with butterfly doors open at the 2010 Paris Motor Show

== In media ==
The DeZir appears as a playable vehicle in video games including Asphalt, Driveclub and Real Racing 3.
