= Renault Étoile Filante =

Land speed car made by Renault

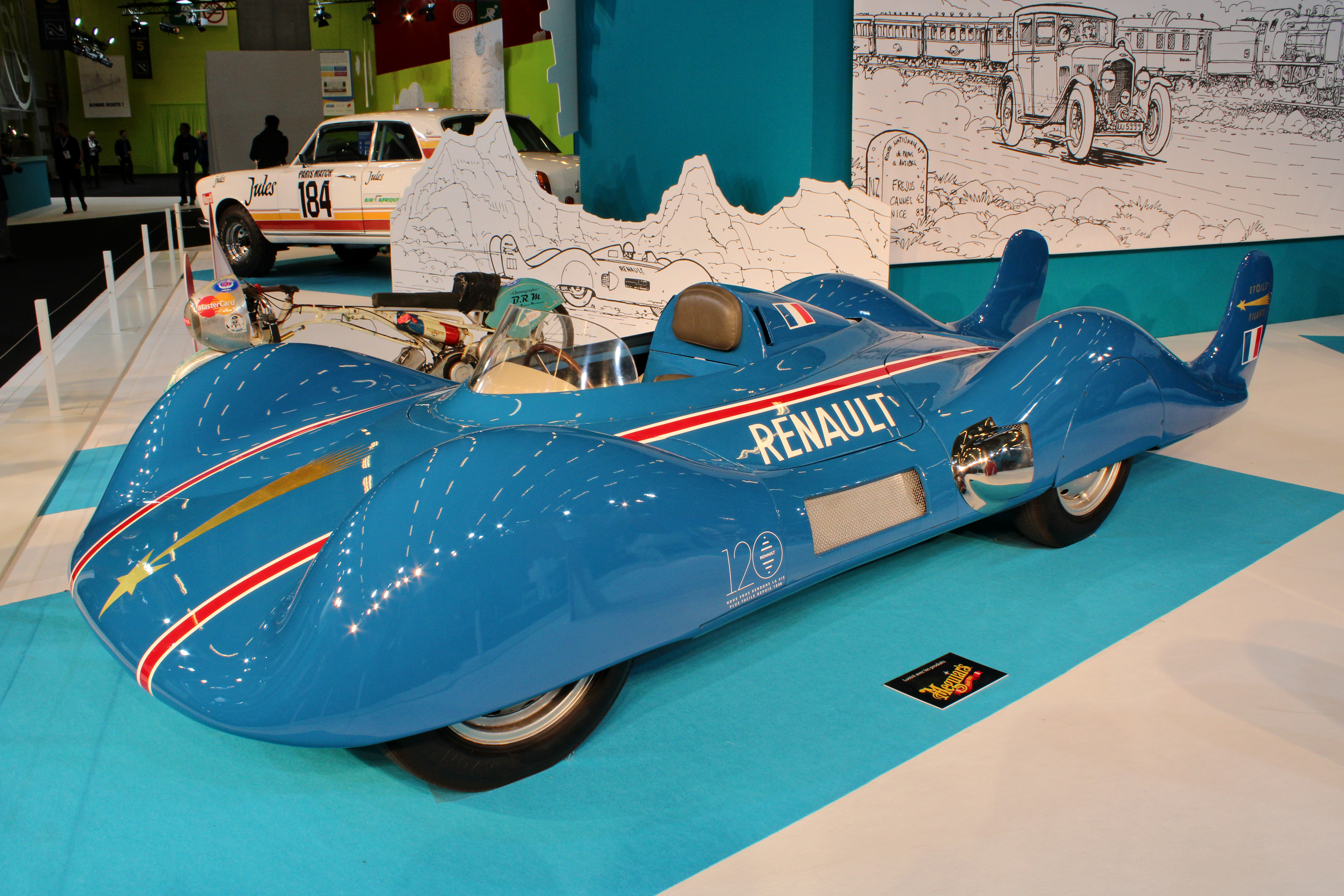

Overview
- Manufacturer: Renault
- Production: 1954
- Designer: Fernand Picard; Albert Lory

Body and chassis
- Class: Land speed record car
- Body style: No-door monoposto streamliner car

Powertrain
- Engine: Turbomeca Turmo gas turbine; 270 bhp (201 kW); 28,000 rpm
- Transmission: 4-speed manual

Dimensions
- Length: 4,840 mm (190.6 in)
- Width: 1,815 mm (71.5 in)
- Height: 999 mm (39.3 in)
- Curb weight: 950 kg (2,094 lb)

The Renault Étoile Filante (Shooting Star) was Renault's only attempt at both creating a gas turbine-powered car and setting a land speed record for such cars.

== History ==
In 1954, the French aeronautical turbine manufacturer, Turbomeca, proposed that Renault make a gas turbine car to exalt the technology's benefits and try to break the speed record for gas turbine vehicles.

Renault developed and tested the car in a wind tunnel between 1954 and 1955. In 1956, Jean Hébert and a Renault Team went off to the Bonneville Salt Flats in Utah for speed tests. The car reached an average speed of 191.0 mph (307.4 km/h).

In the mid-1990s, Renault restored the car and made it operational again. The car was completely dismantled at the Billancourt factory in Paris, respraying the chassis and repairing the engine. In front of an expectant crowd, the car was fired up and moved under its power for the first time since 1956.

It is now conserved as a part of Renault's Historical Cars Collection.

A private collection of Renault sports cars in Mexico has a second Étoile Filante.

== Return to Bonneville ==
In 2016, to celebrate the 60th anniversary of the Étoile Filante's 1956 record run, the car was fitted with an electric motor and brought back to the Bonneville Salt Flats with Nicolas Prost, son of Alain Prost, at the wheel. It did not compete for a record. Instead, a new record of 76.5 mph (123.1 km/h) was set in a Renault Dauphine, again with Nicolas Prost at the wheel.

== See also ==
- Chrysler Turbine Car
- Fiat Turbina
- General Motors Firebird
- Rover-BRM
- Toyota GTV
