= Renault Vivasport =

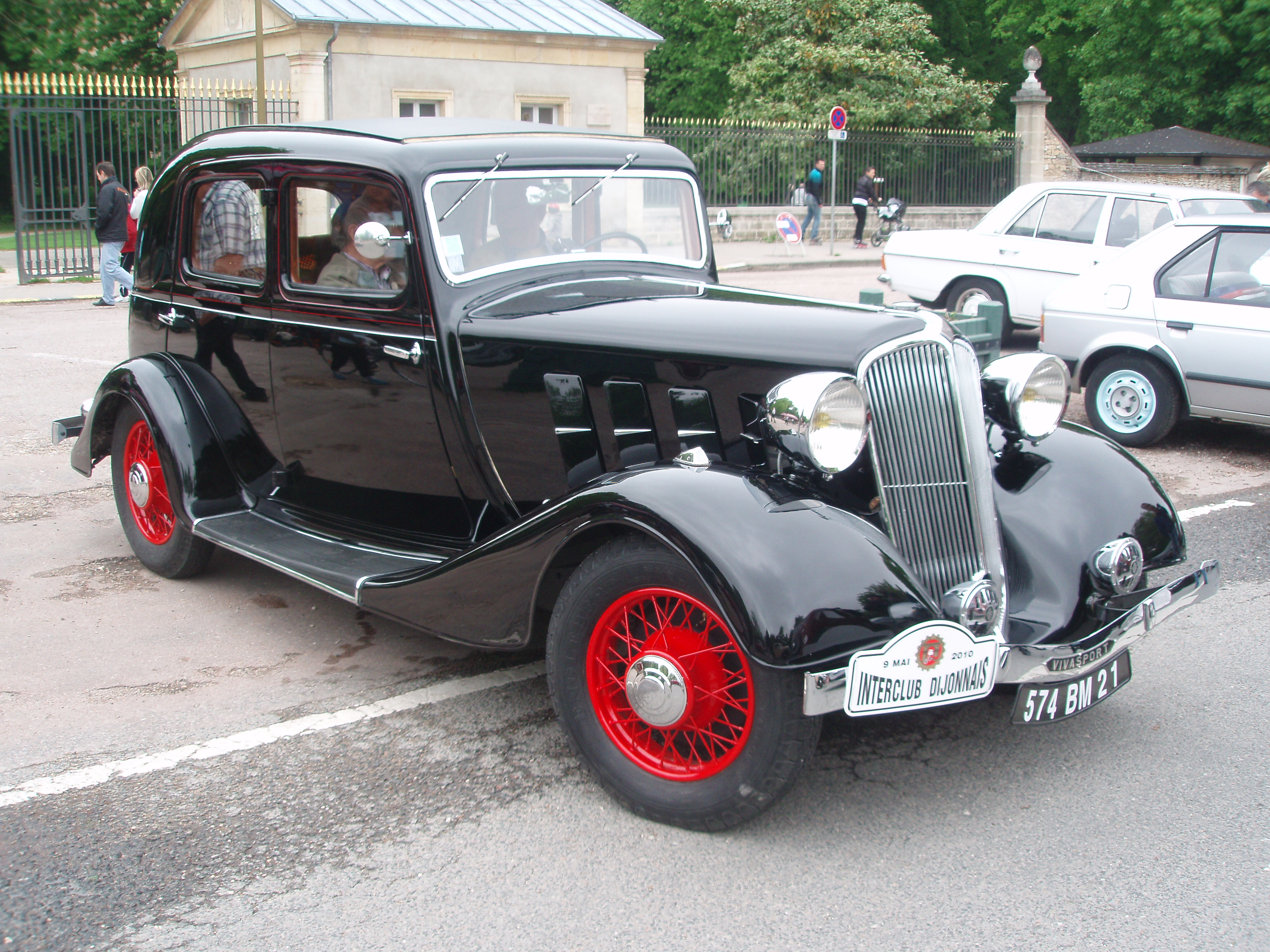

Overview
- Manufacturer: Renault
- Production: 1933–1938; 4,917 produced
- Assembly: Île Seguin, Boulogne-Billancourt, Paris
- Designer: Louis Renault

Body and chassis
- Class: Compact Executive car
- Body style: 2/4-door "Berline aérodynamique" (saloon/sedan); 2-door "Coach aérodynamique" (saloon/sedan); 2-door "Coach aérodynamique tôlé" (coupé); 2-door "Coach décapotable" (convertible); Cabriolet
- Layout: FR layout
- Related: Renault Primastella; Renault Vivastella

Powertrain
- Engine: "Types YZ1/YZ2/YZ4": Straight-six, 3620 cc, 80 HP (1933-35) "Types ACM1/BCT1/BCY1/BCY2": Straight-six, 4085 cc, 95 HP(1935-38)

Dimensions
- Wheelbase: 2,950 mm (116.1 in)

The Renault Vivasport was a 6-cylinder engined executive automobile introduced by Renault in September 1933 and produced till April 1935. A larger engined version was produced between December 1934 and February 1938. As with many Renaults during the 1930s, type changes as well as small often cosmetic facelifts and upgrades appeared frequently.

== Concept ==
The word "sport" in the car's name reflected the application of a familiar formula whereby the engine from a larger model - in this case the Renault Vivastella - was combined with a body from the shorter Renault Primastella. Performance was correspondingly brisker than that of either the Vivastella or the Primastella, with a top speed of 125 km/h (77 mph) listed for a typically bodied version of the car in 1933.

== 1933 launch ==
The initial "YZ1" version of the Vivasport appeared in July 1933. It was powered by a newly enlarged 3620cc engine (which would find its way into the larger Vivastella model only in July 1934). Records indicate that only 21 of the "YZ1" Vivasports were produced, but by the time the last of them emerged from the factory, in October 1933, the manufacturer had already, in September, started producing the "YZ2" version, and it was the "YZ2" that made its debut at the 27th Paris Motor Show, though there was little obvious difference between the versions. Between September 1933 and October 1934 2,172 would be produced.

Louis Renault was keen to make a splash with the new model, and at the 27th Paris Motor Show in October 1933 at the Grand-Palais a "cut" (bisected) "berline" (sedan/saloon) bodied Vivasport was on display. The chassis and engine were complete, but the body was slit down the middle from front to back and the right half removed, allowing show visitors an instant view of the mechanical elements and of the (left half of) the interior. At the time this was an unusual approach to exhibiting cars, and the "découpée" Vivaport display attracted plenty of attention.

== Description ==
The Vivasport presented at the 27th Paris Motor Show was powered by a 3,620 cc, side-valve 6-cylinder engine that placed it in the 21CV car tax band and provided for a claimed a maximum 80hp of power at 3,000 rpm. It sat on a 2,950 mm (116.1 in) wheelbase and came with a choice of stylish mostly sedan/saloon style bodies which were identified by Renault with various eye-catching descriptions most of which included the word "aérodynamique". The manufacturer's listed prices in October 1933 ranged from 35,000 francs for the "Berline aérodynamique" with four doors and four side windows to 40,400 francs for the rather stylish 5-seater 2-door convertible "Coach décapotable". Although Renault competed with Peugeot and Citroën with their smaller cars, this far up the chain competition came from more exclusive auto-makers, and it becomes harder to identify direct competitors for the 21CV Renault Vivasport. Delage models in and around this car tax band came with eight cylinder engines and much higher prices. At the 1933 Motor Show Hotchkiss were promoting their newly updated "Type 620" which was powered by a 3,500 cc 20CV 6-cylinder overhead valve engine and which was priced by Hotchkiss at 40,000 francs in bare chassis form, with an extensive range of coach-built bodies approved by the manufacturer also listed. Of these the least expensive "Berline" (saloon/sedan) bodied offering, the Hotchkiss "Type 620 Normal Berline Caubourg" was listed at 49,800 francs.

== A bargain-price 6-cylinder "berline" for the 1937 model year ==
Three years later, by the time of the 30th Paris Motor Show in October 1936, Renault had added the Viva Grand Sport to their range (in 1935). The Vivasport itself had disappeared from the 1935 Renault catalogue, but returned in 1936, now in version "Type BCT1". The Vivasport's engine size had been increased, in December 1934, to 4,085 cc (although examples of the earlier smaller engined "Type YZ4" model were still being produced till April 1935). The larger engine was still a 6-cylinder side-valve unit, but the 5 mm (0.2 in) increase in the cylinder bore meant that it was now placed in the 23CV car tax band, while listed maximum output increased to 95 HP.

Then wheelbase length was not materially changed, but there was now only a single body type offered, and the decision had evidently been taken to position the Vivasport as a cut-price route to 6-cylinder performance motoring. The body in question was a 4-door "Berline sans malle" (saloon/sedan without a boot/trunk hatch). The steel body was no less aerodynamic than before, but it lacked embellishment, and there was no sign of the fashionable "spats" that covered the top halves of the rear wheels on other 6-cylinder Renault saloons/sedans at this time. In October 1936 the "Berline" bodied Vivasport "Type BCT1" was very aggressively priced at 26,900 francs. The heavy hitters in terms of market volume, Peugeot and Citroën, still did not compete at this level of the market while the domestic auto-makers producing cars in the same tax bracket, notably Delage and Hotchkiss, were pricing their products at much higher levels. A new contender had appeared, however, as a result of the Matford partnership between Mathis and Ford. The "new" V8 power Matford V8-76 (in effect a locally adapted and assembled Ford V8) featured in the 21CV car tax band, offered a claimed maximum power output of 90hp and was listed with a "Berline" (saloon/sedan) body at 33,900 francs.

The Vivasport reached its final "Type BCY2" version in October 1937, but by now the volumes were much diminished, and only 181 examples of this final version had been produced by February 1938 which was when the last Vivasport was manufactured.

== Types ==
Model	Project code	Cylinders/ engine capacity	Power HP @ rpm	Top speed (approx)	Production period month/year	Units produced	Price at launch (FF)	Note
Vivasport	YZ1	6/ 3,620	85 @ 3,000 rpm	125 km/h (78 mph)	07/1933-10/1933	21	35,000	Price for a 4-door saloon/sedan
Vivasport	YZ2	6/ 3,620	85 @ 3,000 rpm	125 km/h (78 mph)	09/1933-10/1934	2,172	-	
Vivasport	YZ4	6/ 3,620	85 @ 3,000 rpm	125 km/h (78 mph)	09/1934-04/1935	1,028	-	
Vivasport	ACM1	6/ 4,085	95 @ 3,000 rpm	130 km/h (81 mph)	12/1934-09/1935	1,007	32,400	Price for a 4-door saloon/sedan
Vivasport	BCT1	6/ 4,085	95 @ 3,000 rpm	130 km/h (81 mph)	10/1936-02/1937	82	26,900	Price for a 4-door saloon/sedan
Vivasport	BCY1	6/ 4,085	95 @ 3,000 rpm	130 km/h (81 mph)	02/1937-09/1937	426	-	
Vivasport	BCY2	6/ 4,085	95 @ 3,000 rpm	130 km/h (81 mph)	10/1937-02/1938	181	-	
