= French presidential inauguration =

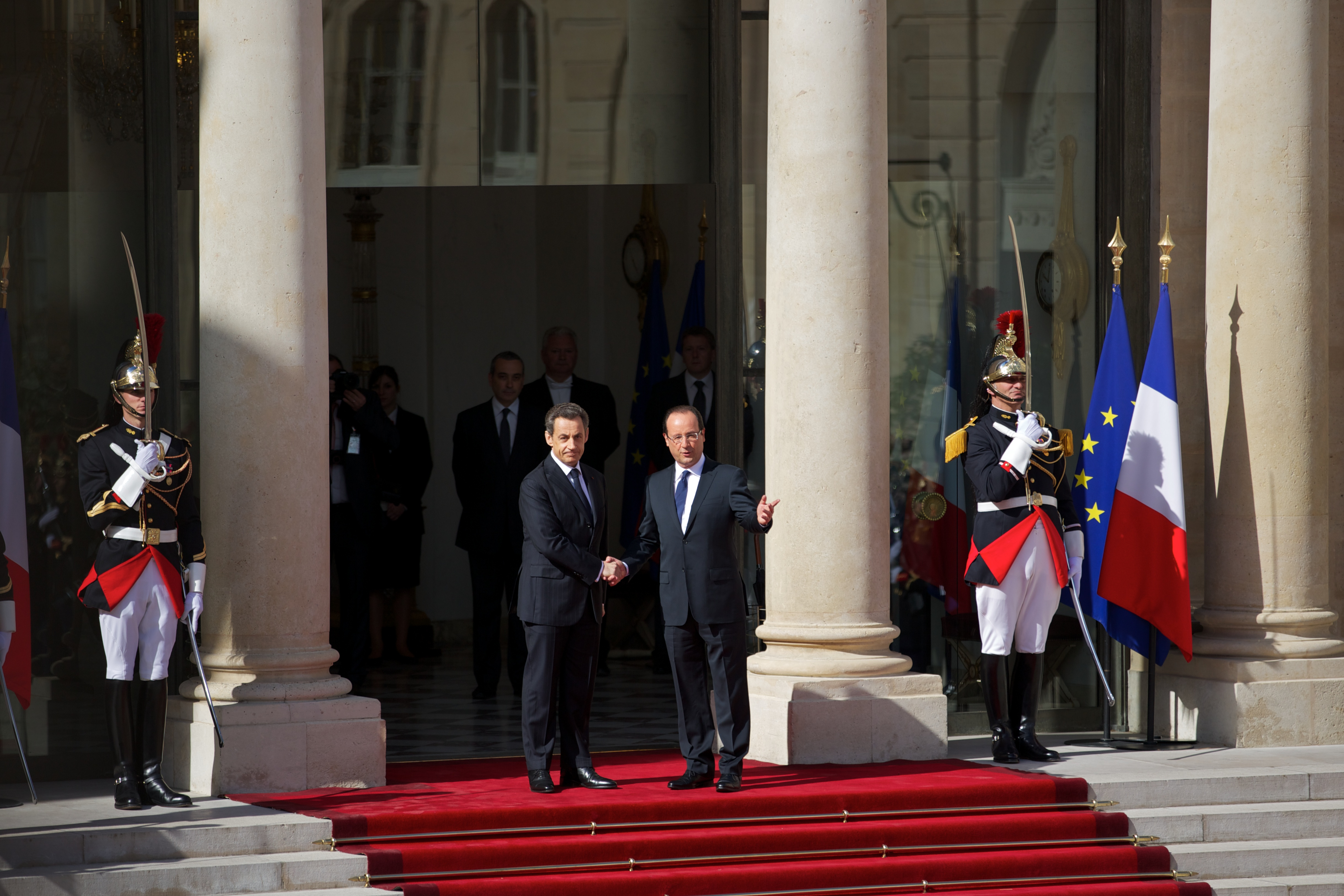
Nicolas Sarkozy and François Hollande at the presidential inauguration on 15 May 2012 at Élysée Palace.

The French presidential inauguration is an event marking the beginning of a new term for the president of France.

The Constitution of France does not mention any requirements for the conduct of proceedings. However, over the years, various traditions have emerged, such that the inauguration is not merely a simple transfer of power but an entire day of parades, speeches, military and civil tributes, and general celebrations. Unlike many other countries, there is no oath of office.

The 'inauguration day' is set about ten days after the second round of the presidential election in France, no later than the last day the mandate of the outgoing president.

The "inauguration" includes not only the transfer of power between the president-elect and the outgoing president, but also of a variety of ceremonial devices, both civil and military. The day is still considered an "inauguration" ("investiture" in French) even if the incumbent President is re-elected. It must be held no later than the last day of the official mandate of the outgoing President or, in case of a vacancy as a result of resignation or death, as soon as possible the results of the presidential election have been made official by the Constitutional Council. Under the Third and Fourth republics, the president-elect was inaugurated immediately on the day of their election by both houses of the Parliament, the ceremony taking place in the Marengo room (adjacent to the office of the president of Congress) of the Palace of Versailles. The inauguration of president of the French Republic is now held in the ballroom of the Élysée Palace, the official residence of the presidency.

== Highlights of the inauguration ==
=== The handover ===
The president-elect arrives at the Élysée Palace, usually by car (Valéry Giscard d'Estaing arrived on foot). They review a detachment of the Republican Guard in the courtyard, before being greeted on the steps by their predecessor. The two then share a conversation in one of the rooms of the Élysée, effectuating the handover, including the communication access codes of the French nuclear arsenal, which constitute an exclusive prerogative of the President. The new head of state then accompanies the outgoing president to the courtyard where they leave the Élysée for good, honoured by a salute from the Republican Guard. This part of the inauguration does not take place where the incumbent president has been re-elected. Until 1974, the outgoing president would attend the entire inauguration.

=== The investiture ceremony ===
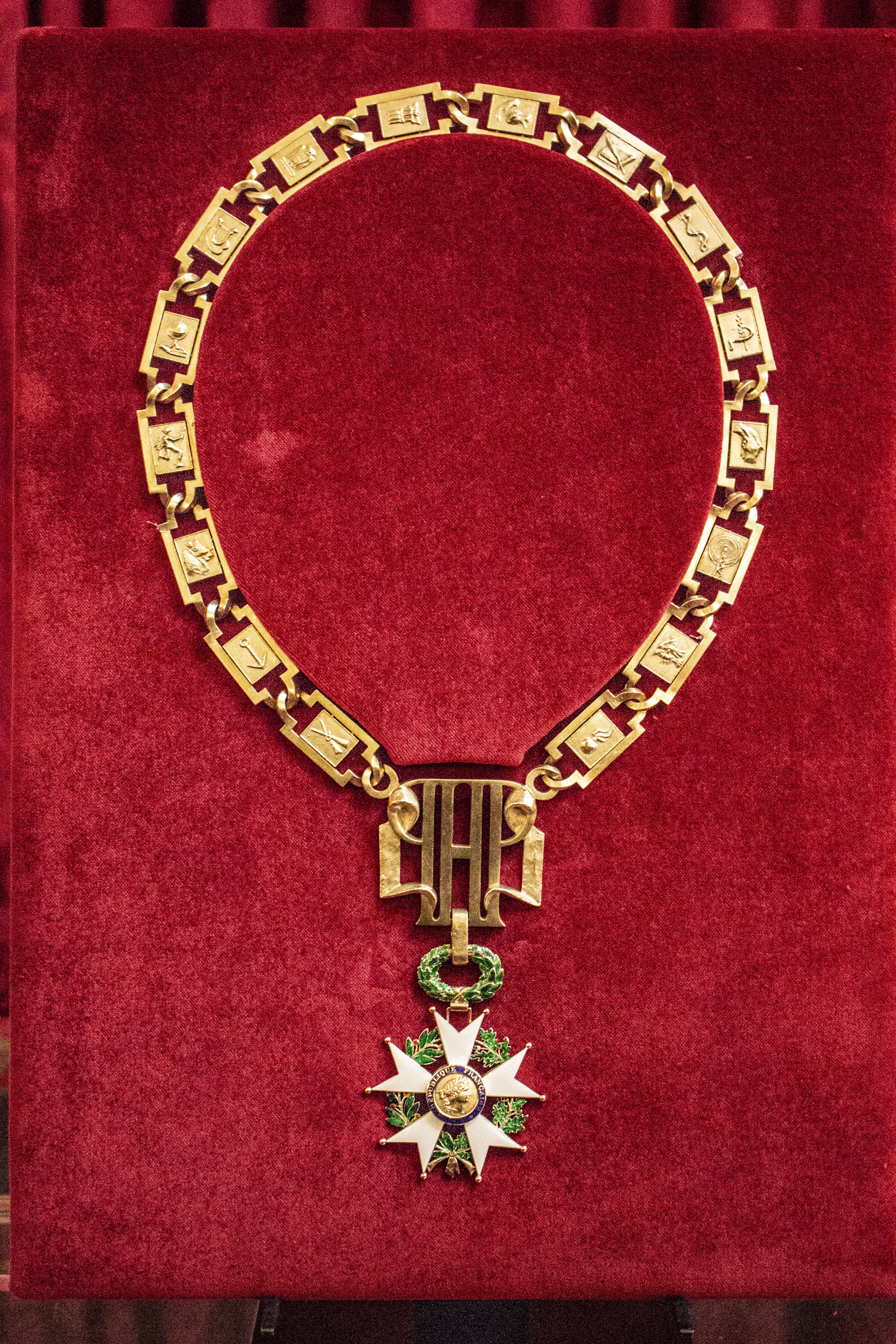
Grand Collar of the Legion of Honor

The president-elect then returns for the inauguration ceremony itself (which has always been held at the ballroom of the Élysée Palace under the Fifth Republic; it used to be held in the Salon des Ambassadeurs), accompanied by the Prime Minister and the presidents of both chambers of the French Parliament, while the chamber orchestra of the Republican Guard plays a solemn march chosen by the newly elected president. The actual inauguration takes place when the president of Constitutional Council announces the official results of the presidential election. It is this announcement that officially transfers powers to the new President and marks the precise commencement of the new presidential mandate. The new head of state then signs the minutes of investiture. The Grand Chancellor of the Legion of Honor then pins on the lapel of the President the rosette of the Grand Cross and presents to him the Grand Collar of the Legion of Honour (composed of sixteen rings of solid gold) placed on a red velvet cushion, pronouncing the ritual phrase:

"Mr. President of the Republic, we recognise you as the Grand Master of the National Order of the Legion of Honour."

The President then delivers their inaugural address, and invited guests are presented one by one by the Chief of Protocol.

In 1981, the new president could not receive the insignia from the Grand Chancellor of the Legion of Honour. The Grand Chancellor, General Alain de Boissieu, son-in-law of General de Gaulle, had decided to resign a few days earlier rather than participate in the inauguration of François Mitterrand, who had in the past called de Gaulle's leadership a "dictatorship". Mitterrand was instead recognised as Grand Master by the senior Grand Cross, General André Biard.

=== Military honors ===
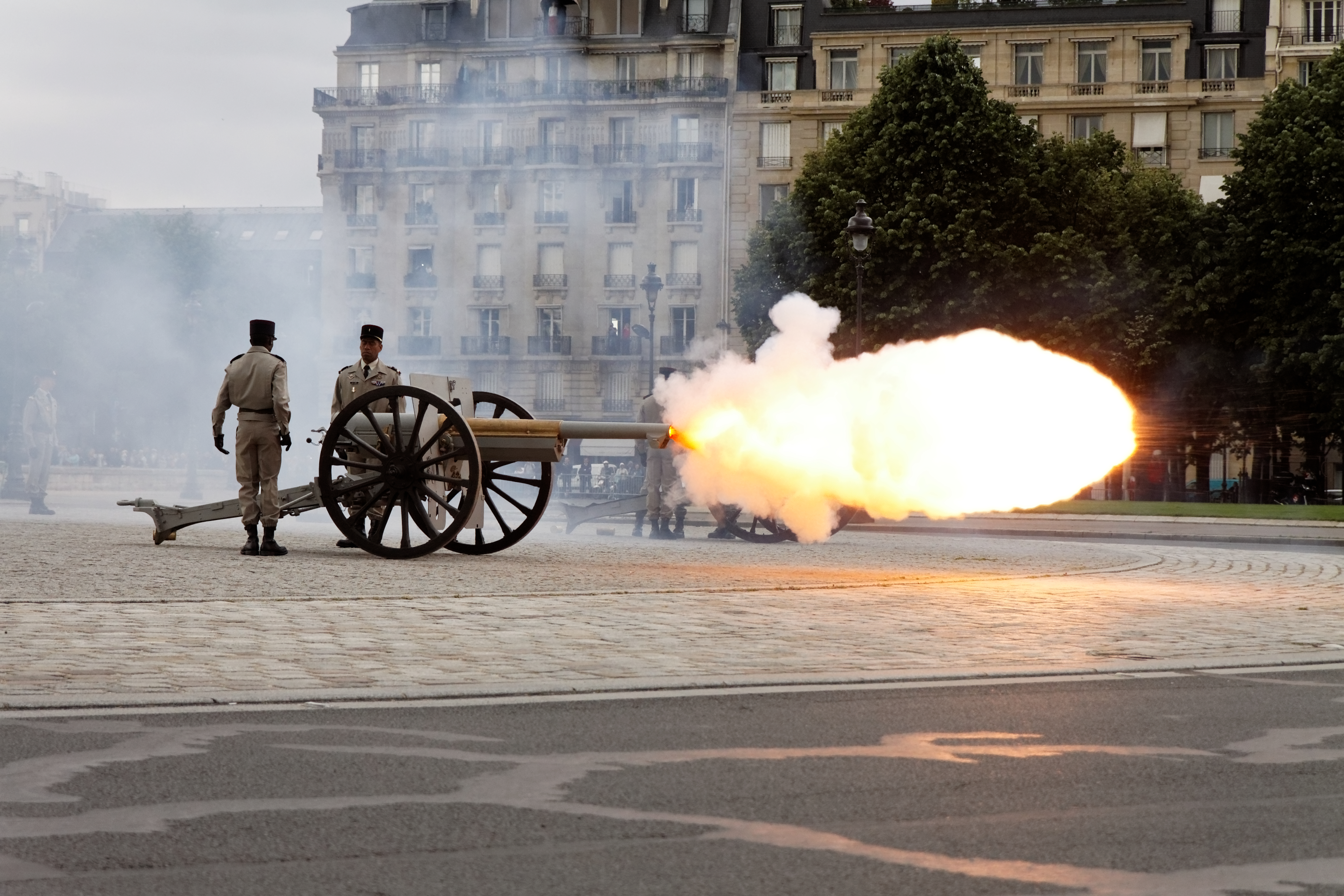
On the Invalides esplanade, the battery of honour of the French artillery firing the 21 gun salute on 15 May 2012

After the ceremony, the president heads to the terrace of the park of the Élysée, accompanied by the Prime Minister and the presidents of both chambers, to receive military honours rendered by the Republican Guard and to render homage to the French flag while La Marseillaise plays. The new president then reviews the troops assembled at the palace. Simultaneously, a 21-gun salute is fired from the Les Invalides by a battery of honour of the French artillery to mark the presidential inauguration (the salute can begin either after the announcement of the results, or during the military honours). This tradition dates back to the 101 shots that were fired under the Ancien Régime at the burial of the dead king and the accession of his successor. The number was reduced to 21 by Charles de Gaulle in 1959. Two Canon 75-Model 1897 guns are used. The blanks are fired once every eight seconds.

=== Tributes outside the Élysée ===
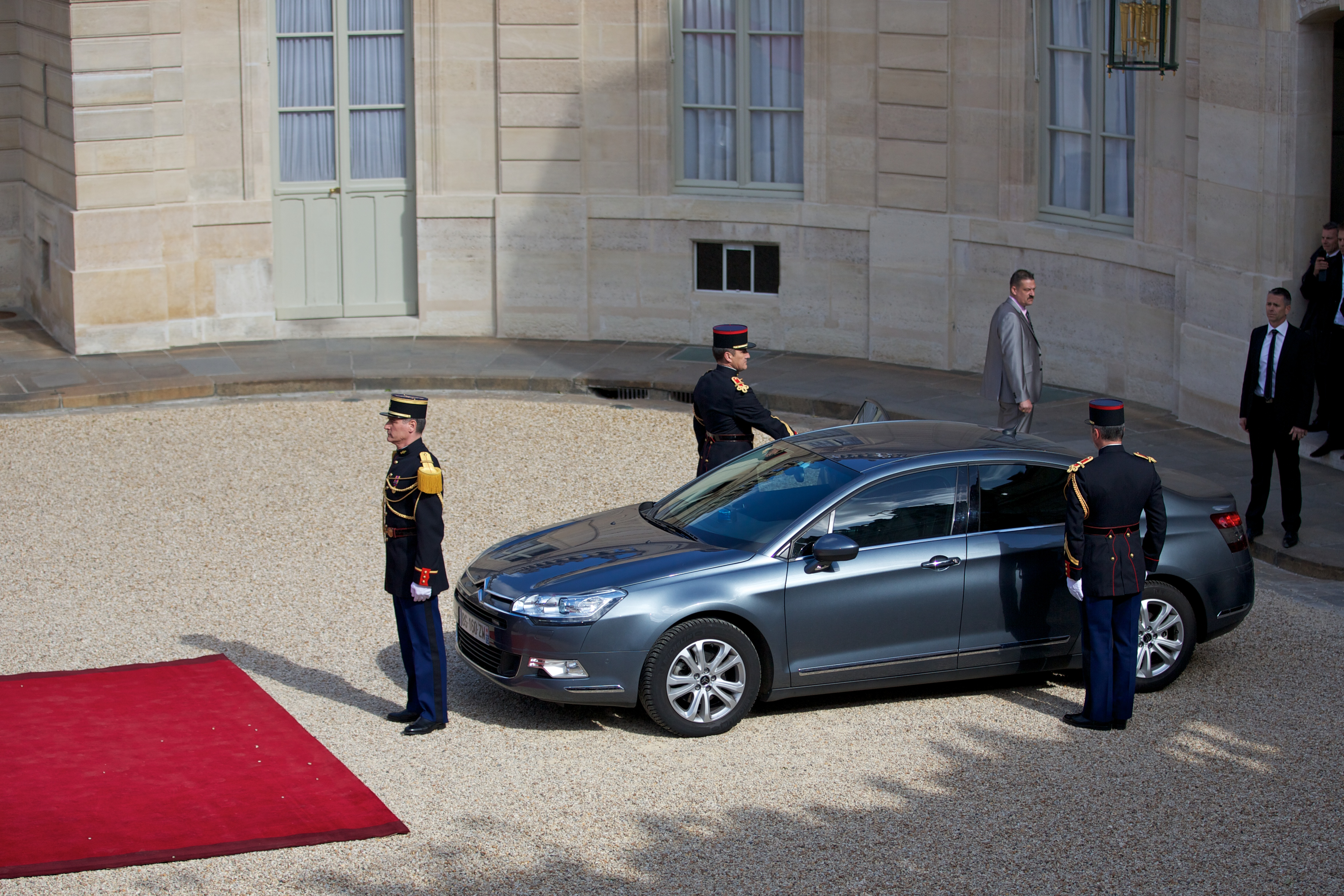
François Hollande in a Citroën C5 at his inauguration, 15 May 2012

The president then leaves the Élysée Palace, usually in the afternoon, after lunch with a few guests. A car has been used since the inauguration of Gaston Doumergue in 1924. Renault cars were standard until 1950, with the 40 HP, the Renault Reinastella and the Renault Suprastella serving in this role. After the Talbot Lago of 1950 used by René Coty, Charles de Gaulle and Georges Pompidou used a Citroën Traction built by Chapron in 1955. Valéry Giscard d'Estaing in 1974 (who made part of the journey on foot), François Mitterrand in 1981 and Jacques Chirac in 1995 used a 5.6 m-long Presidential Citroën SM weighing 1.78 tonnes, commissioned in 1971 by Georges Pompidou. Nicolas Sarkozy in 2007 used a Peugeot 607 Paladine concept-car built in 2000, with an electronically retractable hard roof specially loaned from Peugeot for the occasion. In 2012, François Hollande used a Citroën DS5 Hybrid4 with a sunroof, specially designed for the occasion.

The new President then goes to the Arc de Triomphe de l'Étoile, escorted by the cavalry regiment of the Republican Guard and their band, where they lay a wreath at the Tomb of the Unknown Soldier and rekindle its flame, and then to the City Hall of Paris where they are received by the Mayor of Paris. Several presidents have also adapted these ceremonies to pay tribute to individuals of their choice. Thus, in 1947 Vincent Auriol went to Fort Mont Valerian in order to honor the dead of the Resistance during World War II. François Mitterrand went on foot, accompanied by a huge crowd, up to the square of the Pantheon to place roses on the graves of Victor Schœlcher, Jean Jaurès and Jean Moulin. Nicolas Sarkozy placed wreaths on the statues of Georges Clemenceau and Charles de Gaulle on the Champs-Élysées, before heading to the Bois de Boulogne to honour 35 youth killed during the Resistance. There the letter of Guy Môquet was read by a high school student and the Song of the Partisans was played by Republican Guard. In 2012, François Hollande chose to honour Jules Ferry and Marie Curie.

=== Passage to the Town Hall of Paris ===
The President then visits the Town Hall of Paris as part of a republican tradition, where he meets the mayor, the municipal team, and other personalities of civil society or politics. The parchment of the city is signed.

== Attire ==
Originally, the presidents were dressed in white tie and actually put on the great collar of the Legion of Honor. This outfit was also used for the official photograph, until Georges Pompidou. From the inauguration of Valéry Giscard d'Estaing in 1974, presidents have worn ordinary business attire. The great collar is no longer worn but is presented on a cushion by the Grand Chancellor of the Legion of Honor.
