= Renault Viva Grand Sport =

Viva Grand Sport
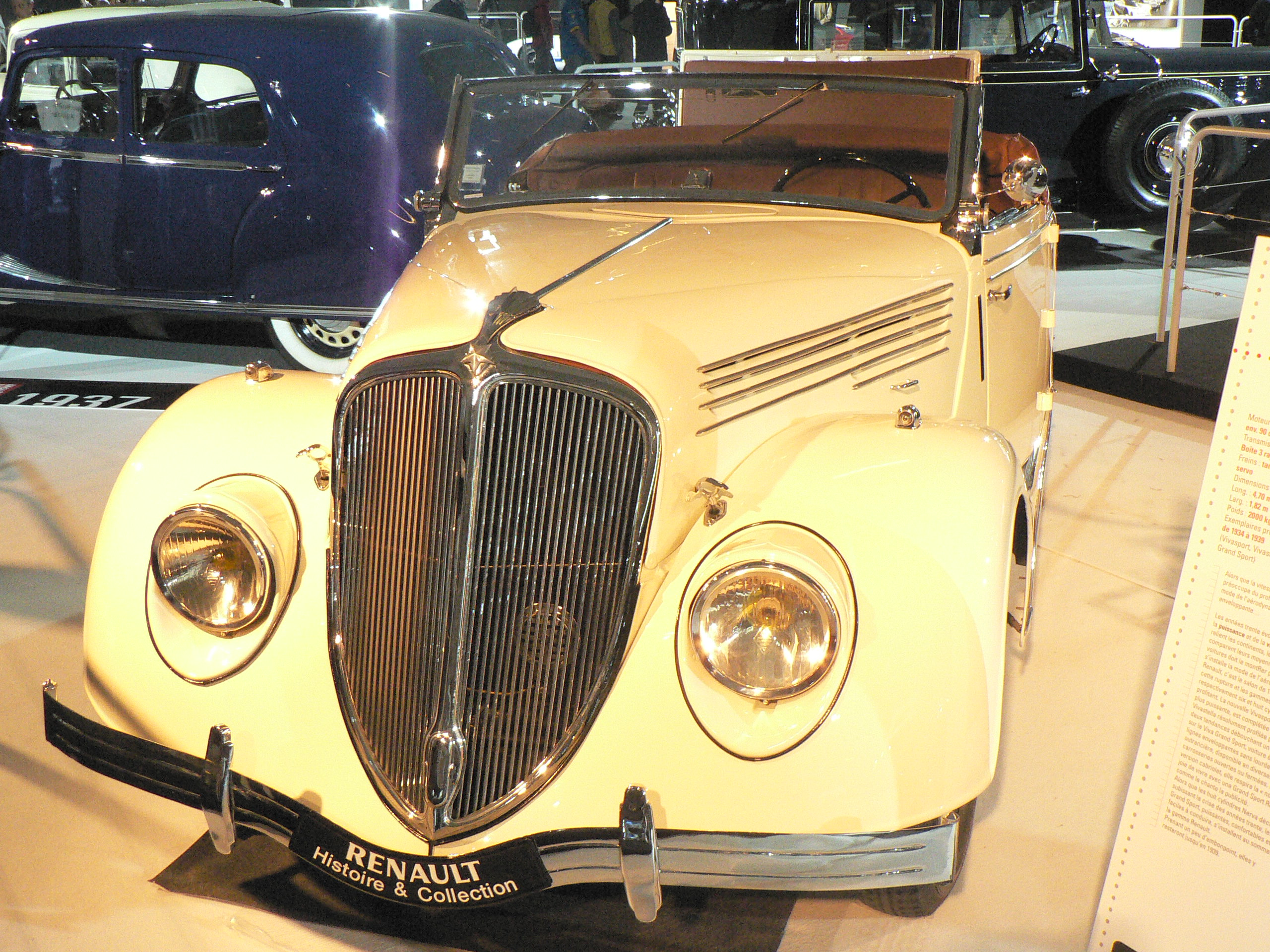

Overview
- Manufacturer: Renault
- Production: 1934–1939
- Assembly: Île Seguin, Boulogne-Billancourt, Paris
- Designer: Marcel Riffard

Body and chassis
- Body style: Sedan
- Related: Renault Vivastella

Powertrain
- Engine: 4085 cc straight-6

Dimensions
- Length: 4,700 mm (185.0 in)
- Width: 1,820 mm (71.7 in)
- Curb weight: 2,000 kg (4,409 lb)

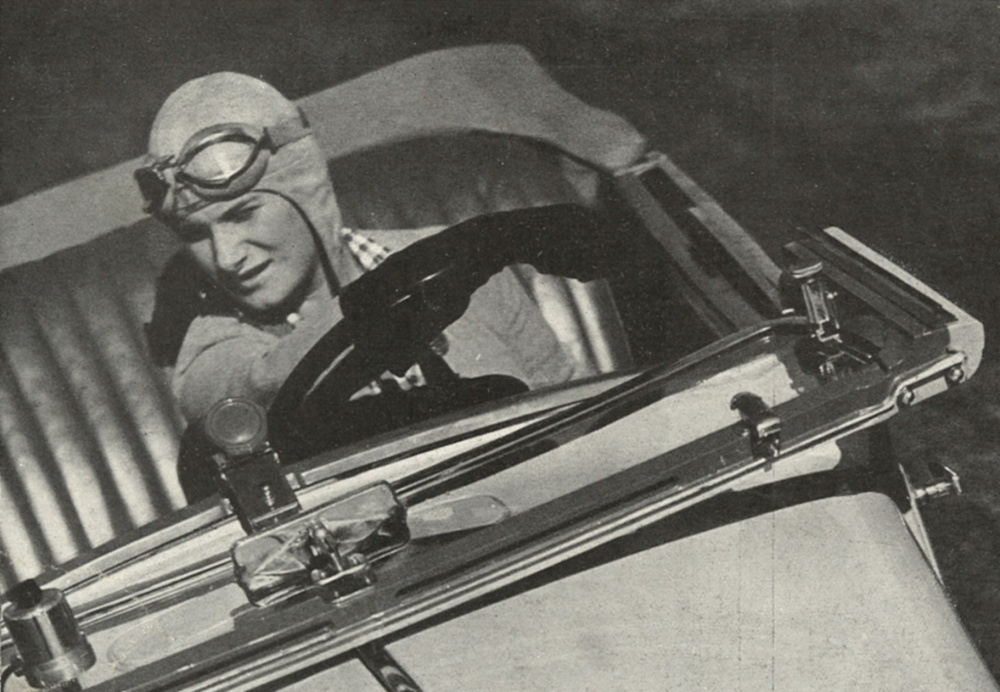
Renault concluded a contract with the high-profile pilot Hélène Boucher to promote the car.

The Renault Viva Grand Sport (branded as the Renault Vivastella Grand Sport before August 1935) was introduced alongside an updated version of the Nervastella in October 1934 at the Paris Motor Show. The last cars were produced in August 1939: in anticipation of the 1940 model year a prototype of another updated Viva Grand Sport was produced during the summer of 1939, but in the event this single car was the only one of its type to be produced.

The car was styled by Marcel Riffard who previously had been better known as an aircraft designer.

== Engine ==
The Viva Grand Sport was powered by a 6-cylinder straight engine with 4,085 cc (249 cu in) displacement.

== Celebrity promotion ==
Renault concluded a contract with the high-profile pilot Hélène Boucher to promote the car.

== Wins ==
In 1934 Renault won the Grand Prix de la Baule.

== Types ==
Model	Project code / "Type"	Cylinders/ engine capacity	Power HP @ rpm	Top speed (approx)	Production period month/year	Units produced	Price at launch (FF)	Note
Vivastella; Grand Sport	ABX	6/ 4,085	95 @ 3,000 rpm	130 km/h (81 mph)	only 10/1934	11	39,000	First eleven cars powered by 3,620cc engine. From March 1935 sold with 4,085cc unit. till March 1935
Vivastella; Grand Sport	ABZ	6/ 4,085	95 @ 3,000 rpm	130 km/h (81 mph)	only 10/1934	2	41,000	
Vivastella; Grand Sport	ACX1	6/ 4,085	95 @ 3,000 rpm	130 km/h (81 mph)	03/1935-08/1935	980	39,000	
Viva Grand Sport	ACX2	6/ 4,085	95 @ 3,000 rpm	130 km/h (81 mph)	08/1935-10/1936	3,752	-	Plus 14 British market Type AES1 cars
Viva Grand Sport	ACX3	6/ 4,085	95 @ 3,000 rpm	130 km/h (81 mph)	09/1936-02/1937	391	32,900	Plus 3 British market Type AES2 cars
Viva Grand Sport	BCX1	6/ 4,085	95 @ 3,000 rpm	130 km/h (81 mph)	02/1937-10/1937	2,296	-	Plus 10 British market Type BCZ1 cars
Viva Grand Sport	BCX2	6/ 4,085	95 @ 3,000 rpm	130 km/h (81 mph)	09/1937-11/1937	216	43,000	
Viva Grand Sport	BCX3	6/ 4,085	95 @ 3,000 rpm	130 km/h (81 mph)	10/1937-07/1938	1,132	-	Plus 93 British market Type BCZ2 cars
Viva Grand Sport	BCX4	6/ 4,085	95 @ 3,000 rpm	130 km/h (81 mph)	04/1938-10/1938	136	-	
Viva Grand Sport	BDV1	6/ 4,085	95 @ 3,000 rpm	130 km/h (81 mph)	09/1938-08/1939	1,128	49,000	
Viva Grand Sport	BDV2	6/ 4,085	95 @ 3,000 rpm	130 km/h (81 mph)	only 07/1939	1	-	Prototype
