= Renault Primastella =

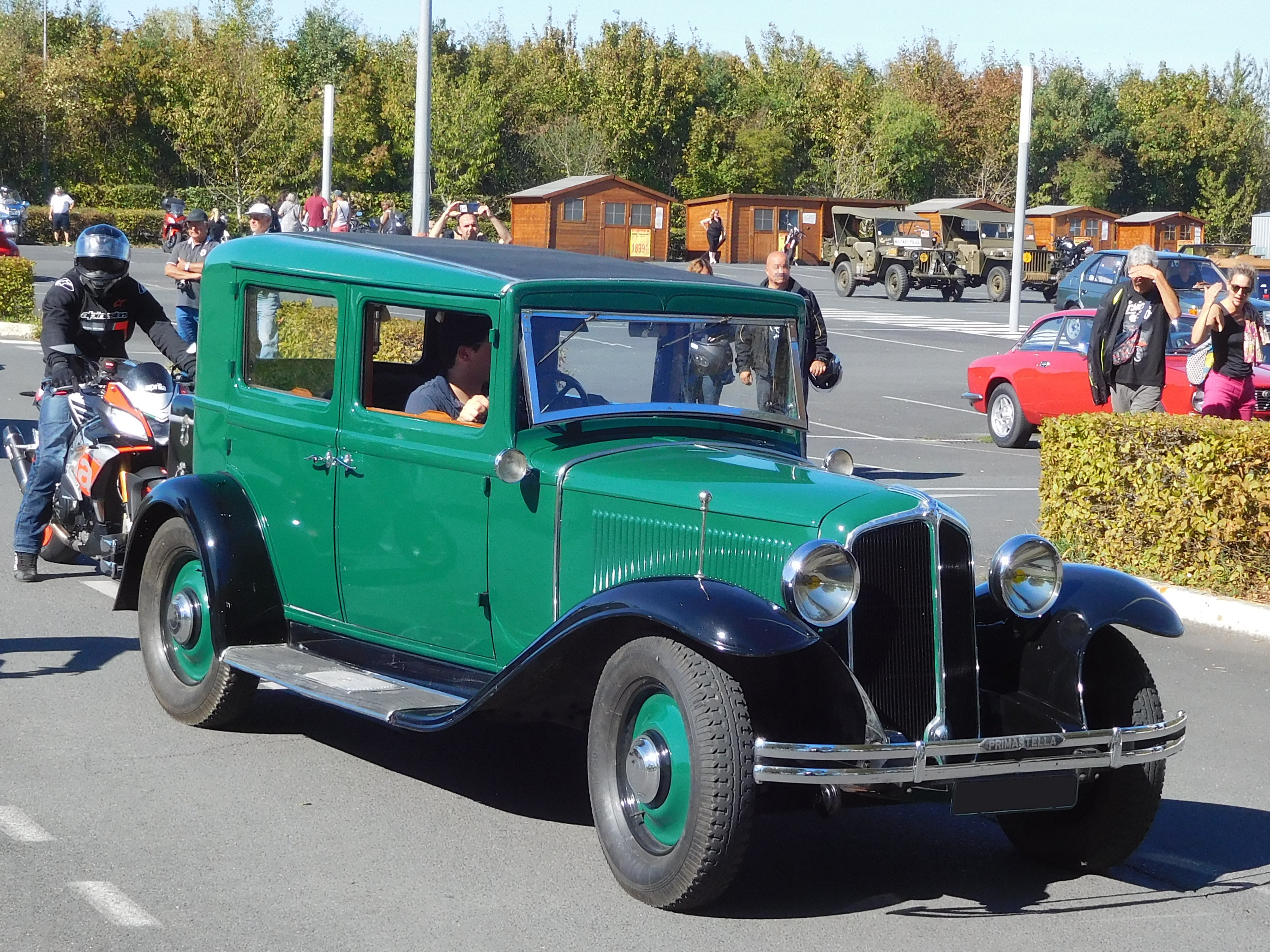

Overview
- Manufacturer: Renault
- Production: 1932–1935
- Assembly: France: Île Seguin, Boulogne-Billancourt, Paris
- Designer: Louis Renault

Body and chassis
- Class: Mid-size car Large family car
- Body style: 4-door Sedan; 4-door Convertible; 2-door Convertible
- Layout: FR layout
- Platform: Renault Vivastella
- Related: Renault Vivasix; Renault Vivastella

Powertrain
- Engine: 3180cc 16CV I6, 65HP; 3620cc 16CV I6, 85HP
- Transmission: 3-speed manual

Dimensions
- Wheelbase: 2950 mm
- Length: 4250 mm
- Width: 1800 mm
- Curb weight: 1,150–1,200 kg

Chronology
- Predecessor: Renault Monastella
- Successor: Renault Novaquatre

The Renault Primastella (Type PG8) was a mid-size luxury car or executive car automobile manufactured between 1932 and 1935 by Renault.

== Details and Evolutions ==
The Primastella was released in 1932 with a 6 cylinders 16CV engine, derived from that of the Renault Vivastella but with a slightly smaller cylinder bore. The Primastella "Type PG8" was produced until 1933.

At the 27th Paris Motor Show, in October 1933, the Primastella "Type PG10" appeared. It featured Renault's "aérodynamique" body style, most readily distinguishable by a sloping tail in place of the very vertical one of the earlier Primastella PG8. It was the manufacturer's intention to provide new "aérodynamique" bodies across their range, and this they achieved by the middle of 1934, but the Primastella and the larger cars were already sporting this new look before the end of 1933.

== Types ==
- PG8 (1932–1933)
- PG10 (1933–1935)

== Characteristics ==
- Top speed: 130 km/h (81 mph)
- Power: 65 hp (48 kW; 66 CV), 85 hp (63 kW; 86 CV)
- Brakes: with cables on drums AV and AR
- Battery: 6 V
