= Renault Nervastella =

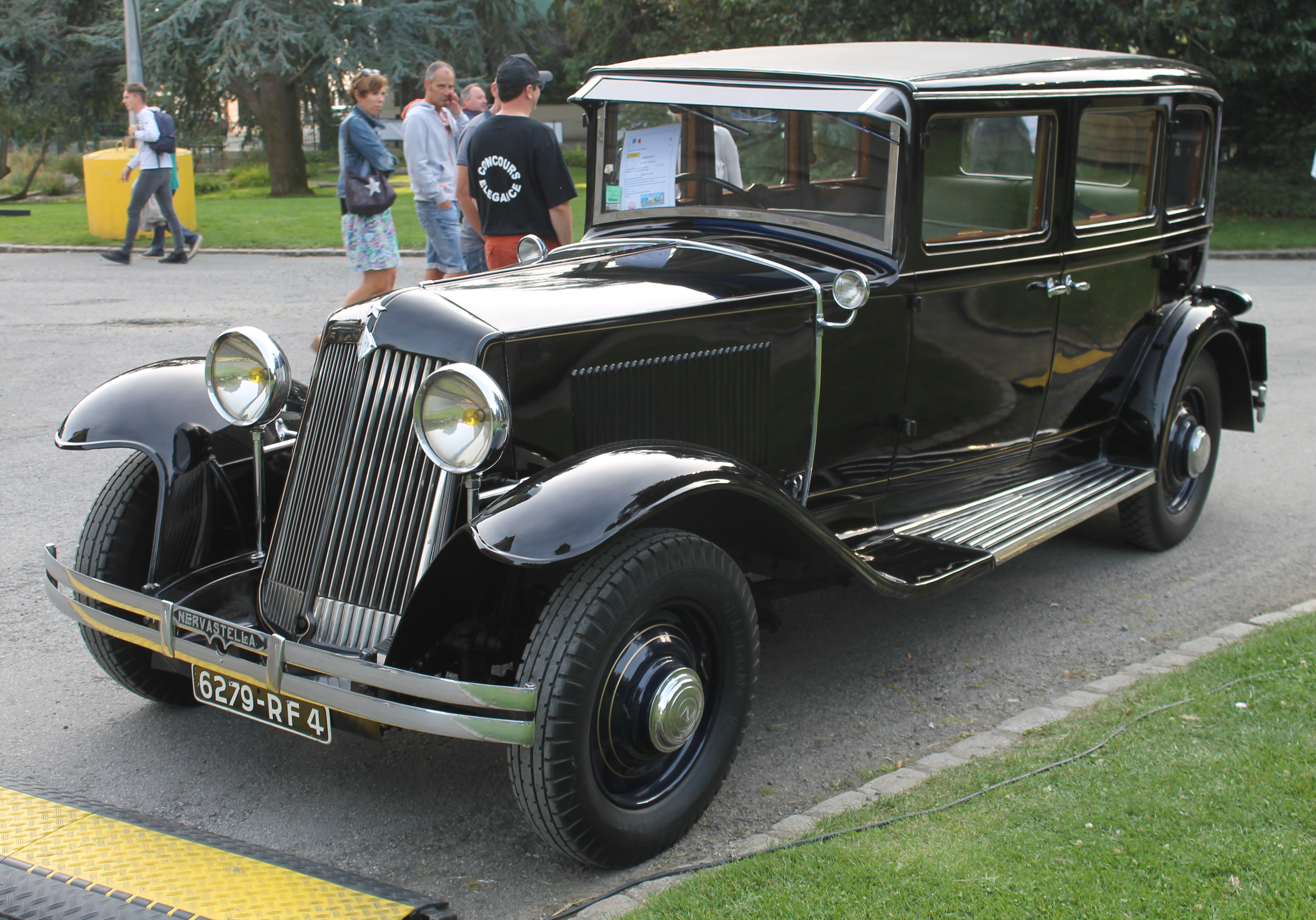
- Renault Nervastella (TG2)

Overview
- Production: 1930–1937
- Assembly: Île Seguin, Boulogne-Billancourt, Paris
- Designer: Louis Renault

Body and chassis
- Class: Full-size luxury car
- Body style: Berline (saloon/sedan), Limousine, coupé, cabriolet
- Related: Renault Nervasport

Powertrain
- Engine: 4241 cc I8; 4825 cc I8; 5447 cc I8

Dimensions
- Wheelbase: 3,350–3,620 mm (131.9–142.5 in)

Chronology
- Predecessor: Renault Reinastella
- Successor: Renault Suprastella

The Nervastella is a large automobile constructed by Renault between 1930 and 1937. It was used as a state car and pictures of the president of the French Republic sitting in a Nervastella can therefore be seen in newsreels from the mid-1930s.

The car was a smaller brother to the Renault Reinastella which had been launched a year earlier, but the Nervastella was technically more advanced, and with a 3,350 mm (131.9 in) wheelbase it was still, by the standards of the time and place, large.

In the early 1930s Renault introduced a number of models with names that ended in "-stella", which was a conscious reference to the Latin word for a "star". "Nerva" is a reference to a Roman emperor, and Nerva, Spain.

== Engines ==
The car was powered by a 8-cylinder in-line engine, but the size of the power unit changed through the car's production run.

The Nervastella was launched with a 4241 cc engine for which 100 PS (74 kW) of power was listed, achieved at a then impressively quick 3300 rpm. The engine size grew to 4825 cc in 1933 and increased again, for 1935, to 5448 cc. The 1933 increase was not accompanied by any increase in claimed maximum power for the standard Nervastella, and even the 1935 engine capacity increase only raised the listed output to 110 PS (81 kW).

== Evolution ==
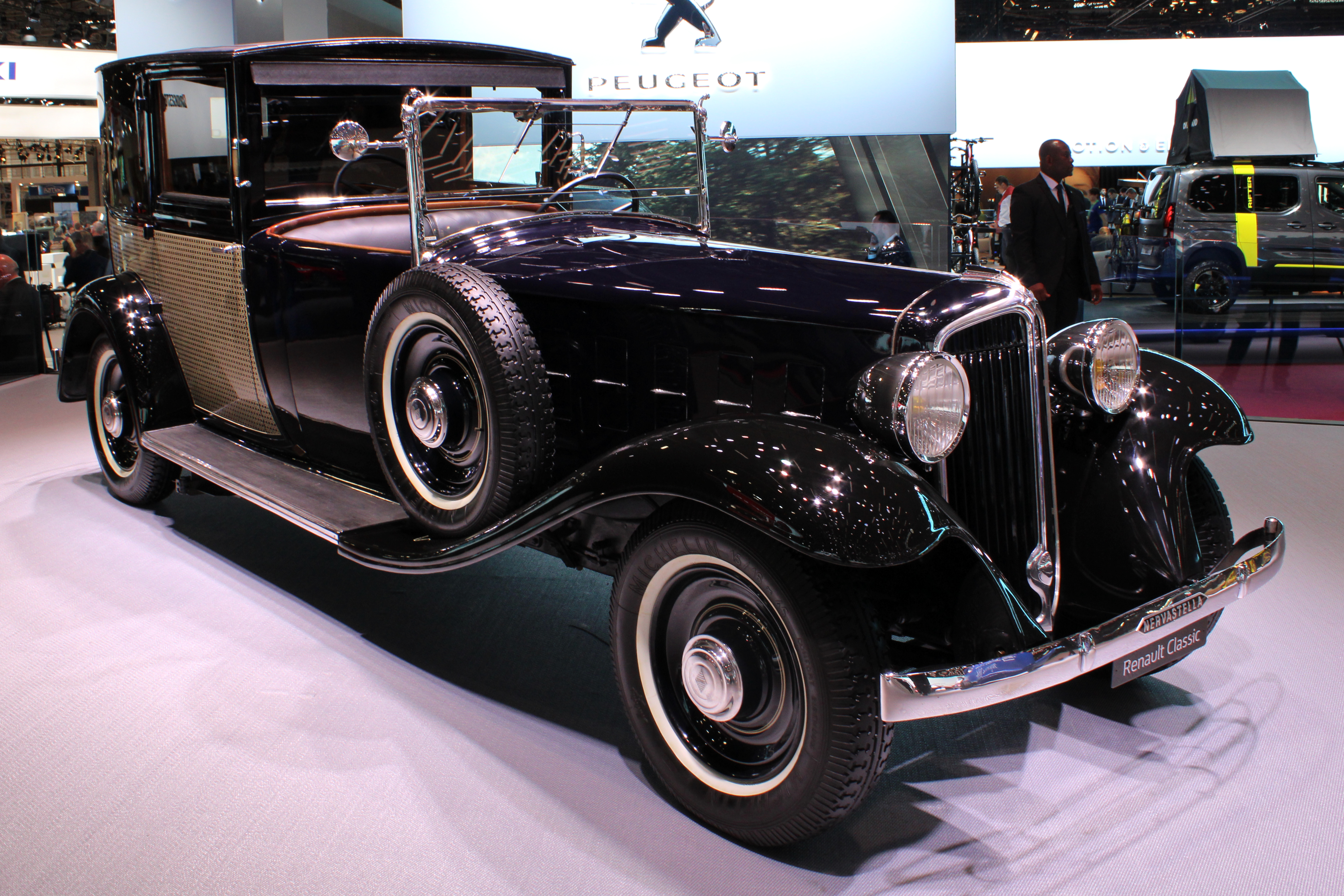
1934 Renault Nervastella (TG4)

The car originally appeared as a four-door "Berline" (saloon/sedan) or as a "Coupé de ville" (large two door luxury coupé). The range was extended a year later with the long wheel-base "six-light" limousine with an extra pair of side windows between the C-pillar and the rear doors and space for five or seven people.

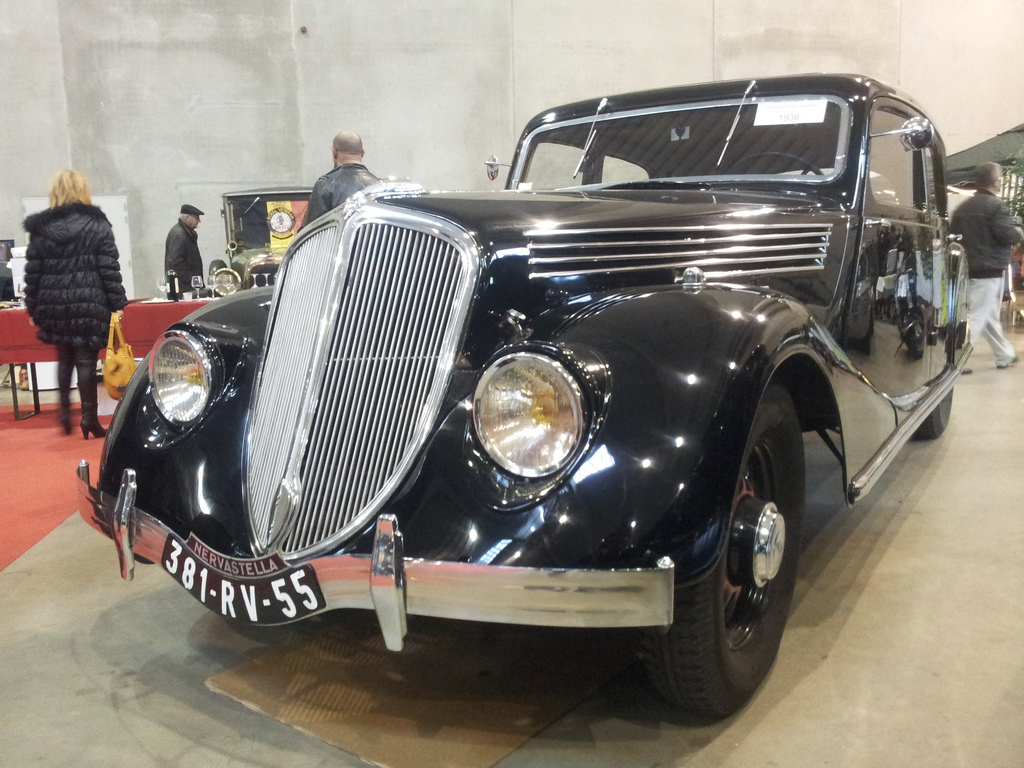
Renault Nervastella (ABM4)

A reduced specification version, sharing the 4241 cc engine of the Nervastella, badged as the Renault Nervahuit was exhibited at the Paris Motor Show in October 1930 and offered during 1931. The Nervahuit's starting price in January 1931, of 48,000 francs for a torpedo bodied car, compared with a starting price for a standard "Berline" (saloon/sedan) bodied Nervastella of 95,000 francs.

There was a complete model change in 1932: the word "aérodynamique" is much in evidence in reports on the Renault range in the early 1930s. The "Nervastella ZD2" cars now received "American-style" pressed-steel bodies with mildly sloping tails associated with the newly arriving "aerodynamic" fashion of the time. In this form, the Nervastella was effectively a longer wheel base version of the manufacturer's (already substantial) Vivastella model. The "standard" wheelbase Nervastella sat on the same 3,350 mm (131.9 in) wheelbase as the "long" wheelbase Vivastella, which for the Nervastella came with body types that included the "Berline aérodynamique" with seating for five at 49,000 francs. A longer 3,590 mm (141.3 in) wheelbase supported the "Conduite interieure aérodynamique" with seating for seven, listed at 52,000 francs. Both these were effectively large sedan/saloon bodied cars. There was also a lighter, sportire, and less well-equipped model introduced in March 1932, the Nervasport.

A price reduction of 2000 francs was available to any customer prepared to order a Nervastella with the previous year's bodywork, which could have reflected a backlog of unsold cars, or may simply indicate the high cost of the new steel presses needed to form the more subtly shaped less slab-sided car bodies coming into fashion at this time. In addition to the standard bodied cars, the Nervastella could still be purchased in base chassis form for the fitting of more exclusive "bespoke" bodywork.

The Nervastella ABM6 was exhibited as a 1937 model at the 30th Paris Motor Show in October 1936. By this time the only body type offered for the Nervastella was the "six-light" limousine, using the manufacturer's "long" 3,380 mm (133.1 in) wheelbase chassis. The engine size had grown to 5448 cc and claimed maximum power was up to 115 PS (85 kW). There was also, this year, a related Renault Nerva Grand Sport Type ABM7 with a wheelbase of "only" 3,210 mm (126.4 in) and offered with a small selection of large two-door "Coach" and "Cabriolet" style bodies.

A year later the Nervastella had disappeared from the manufacturer's show stand. It was replaced by the Suprastella.

== Types ==
- TG/TG1/TG2/TG3/TG4 (1246 Nervastellas produced: 1929/33) - "TG5" was the name for the Nervasport
- ZD2/ZD4 (318 produced: 1933/35)
- ACS1/ACS2 (198 produced: 1935/36)
- ABM4/ABM6 (167 produced: 1935/37)
