= Renault Vivastella =

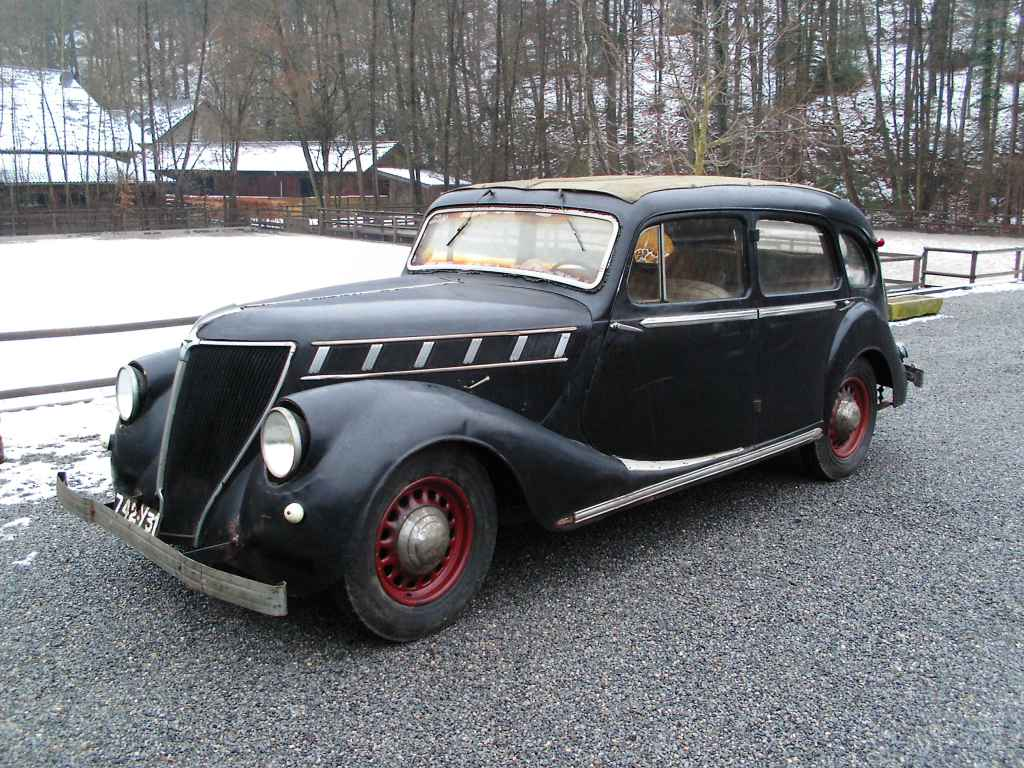

Overview
- Manufacturer: Renault
- Production: 1929–1939
- Assembly: Île Seguin, Boulogne-Billancourt, Paris
- Designer: Louis Renault

Body and chassis
- Class: Executive car (E)
- Body style: 4-door saloon
- Layout: FR layout
- Related: Renault Vivasport; Renault Suprastella; Renault Primastella

Powertrain
- Engine: 1929-1934 (PG4/PG5/PG7) I6, 3180 cc, 52 HP, 65HP (ZA2) I6, 1924-1939; 3620 cc, 85 HP (ACR1/ABD) I6, 4085 cc, 100HP

Dimensions
- Wheelbase: 3,110–3,260 mm (122.4–128.3 in)
- Length: 4,450–4,930 mm (175.2–194.1 in)
- Width: 1,700–1,800 mm (66.9–70.9 in)

Chronology
- Predecessor: Renault Vivasix
- Successor: Renault 20/30

First generation
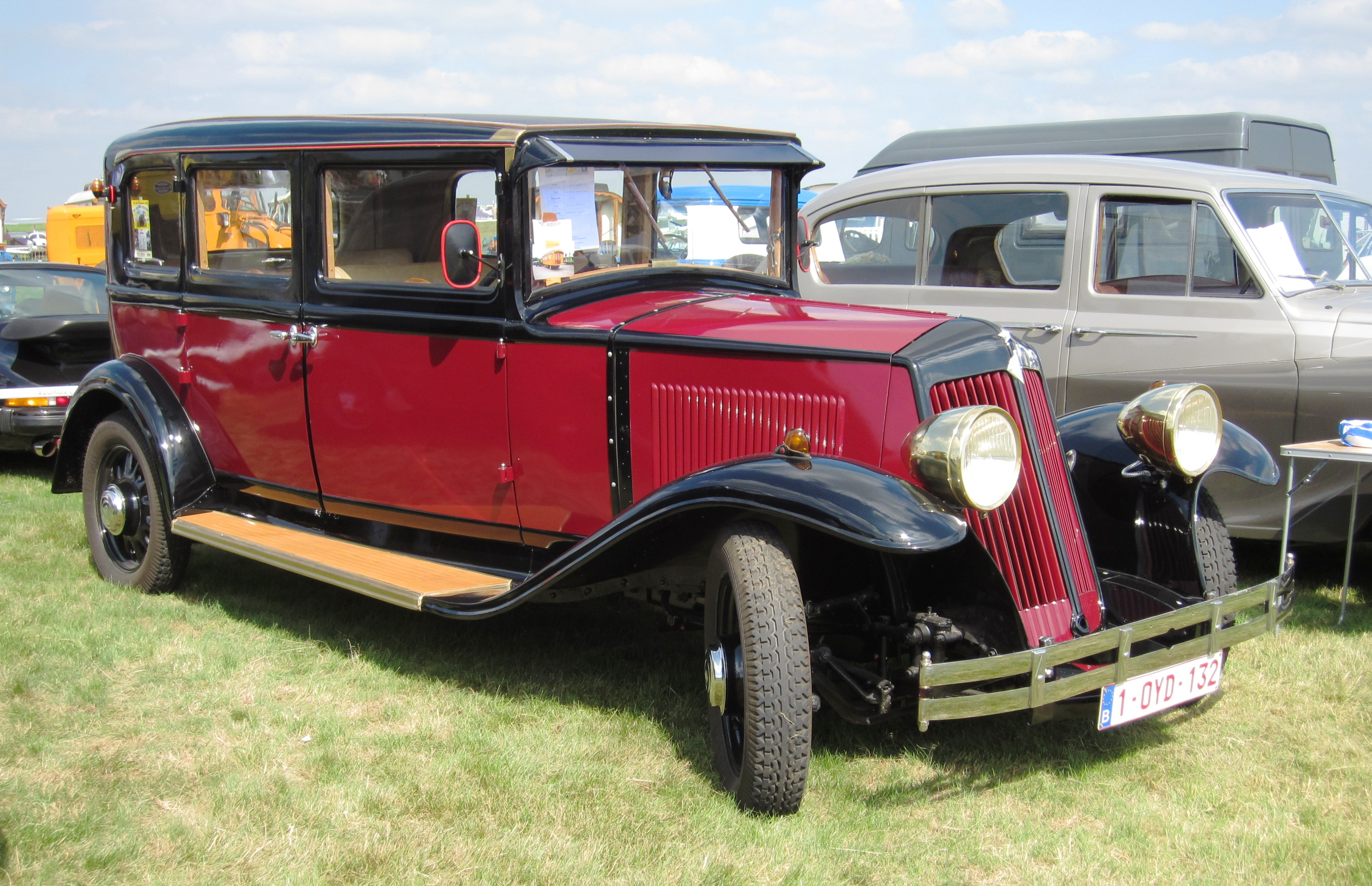

Overview
- Production: 1929–1934

Body and chassis
- Class: Executive car (E)
- Body style: 4-door saloon
- Related: Renault Vivasix

Powertrain
- Engine: I6 3180 cc, 65HP
- Transmission: 3-speed manual

Second generation
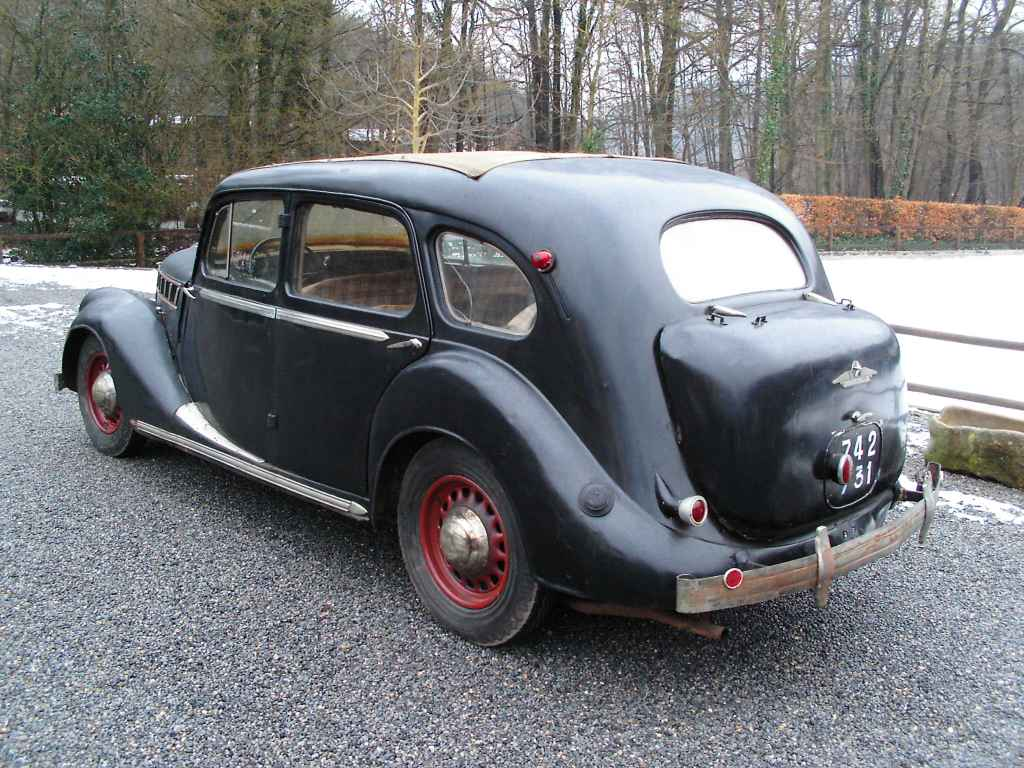

Overview
- Production: 1935–1939

Body and chassis
- Class: Executive car (E)
- Body style: 4-door saloon

Powertrain
- Engine: I6, 4085cc, 100HP
- Transmission: 3-speed manual

The Renault Vivastella was an executive car introduced by Renault in October 1928 and produced for the model years 1929 - 1939.

The car was modified and changed with unusual frequency even by the standards of Renault in the 1930s, and following its evolution in retrospect is rendered more complicated by the way that the Renault catalogue frequently listed two succeeding generations of the model simultaneously, but the Vivastella always occupied a place in the manufacturer's line-up a little below the slightly longer Renault Reinastella. In Latin, "stella" means "star", and viva means "live long".

== Evolution ==
The Vivastella was introduced at the 22nd Paris Motor Show in October 1928 as a more luxurious version of the Renault Vivasix.

=== First generation ===
- 1929 The "Renault Vivastella Type PG2" had an engine of 3180cc (16CV) with claimed output of 52 HP
- 1930 The "Renault Vivastella Type PG4 was 15 cm larger than the previous model.
- 1932, a 65 horsepower engine was introduced.
- 1933, the new series Type PG5 (5 seater) and PG7 (7 seater) were introduced
- 1934 The "Renault Vivastella Type ZA2" was introduced; it had a radiator behind the engine, which was enlarged in Spring 1934 to 3620cc, now giving a maximum output of 80HP. The 6-cylinder units shared the same 120mm cylinder stroke length, but the bore (cylinder diameter) on the larger engine was increased by 5mm to 80mm. Although a new more modern Vivastella was introduced for 1934, the earlier model continued to be listed, at an attractively lower price, in the catalogue. It incorporated most of the new mechanical elements of the new car, but used the older much more vertical looking bodywork. Derivative models, the Renault Vivasport and the sporting Renault Viva Grand Sport were also introduced.

=== Second generation ===
- In 1935, the new Vivastella (Type ACR1) was introduced with a new aerodynamic body.
- From 1936, several new Vivastella versions were introduced at approximately six monthly intervals, one after another, Types ADB1, ADB2 (October 1936-March 1937), ADB3 (March 1937-October 1936), ADB4 (October 1937-April 1938), ADB5 (April 1938-) and BDZ1 with a new engine of 4085cc and 100HP, and an (even) more aerodynamic body.

== Types ==
Model	Project code	Cylinders/ engine capacity	Power HP @ rpm	Top speed (approx)	Production period month/year	Units produced	Price at launch (FF)	Note
Vivastella	PG2	6/ 3,180	60 @3,000	110 km/h (68 mph)	09/1928-09/1929	-	60,000	
Vivastella	PG3	6/ 3,180	60 @3,000	110 km/h (68 mph)	08/1929-09/1930	1,091	60,000	
Vivastella	PG4	6/ 3,180	60 @3,000	115 km/h (71 mph)	09/1930-08/1931	869	-	Light-weight chassis
Vivastella	PG5	6/ 3,180	60 @3,000	115 km/h (71 mph)	07/1931-11/1932	2,223	52,000	
Vivastella	PG7	6/ 3,180	65 @ 3,100	120 km/h (75 mph)	09/1932-05/1933	1,440	-	
Vivastella	PG7 SA	6/ 3,180	65 @ 3,100	120 km/h (75 mph)	05/1933-10/1933	383	-	
Vivastella	PG9	6/ 3,180	65 @ 3,100	120 km/h (75 mph)	09/1933-04/1934	746	-	First "aerodynamic" bodied version
Vivastella	PG11	-	-	-	11/1933-12/1933	6	-	
Vivastella	ZA2	6/ 3,620	85 @ 3,000	125 km/h (78 mph)	09/1933-10/1934	895	33,800	22 were "Sahara" bodied cars
Vivastella	ZA3	6/ 3,620	85 @ 3,000	125 km/h (78 mph)	09/1934-05/1935	895	-	
Vivastella	ACR1	6/ 4,085	95 @ 3,000	130 km/h (81 mph)	01/1935-08/1935	609	38,000	smaller 3,620cc engine available on request
Vivastella	ACR2	6/ 4,085	95 @ 3,000	130 km/h (81 mph)	08/1935-01/1936	358	-	
Vivastella	ADB1	6/ 4,085	95 @ 3,000	130 km/h (81 mph)	09/1935-01/1937	804	38,000	
Vivastella	ADB2	6/ 4,085	95 @ 3,000	130 km/h (81 mph)	09/1936-06/1937	191	36,900	
Vivastella	ADB3	6/ 4,085	95 @ 3,000	130 km/h (81 mph)	06/1937-10/1937	192	-	
Vivastella	BCH1 Sahara	6/ 4,085	95 @ 3,000	130 km/h (81 mph)	05/1937-09/1937	17	-	"Colonial" version
Vivastella	ADB4	6/ 4,085	95 @ 3,000	130 km/h (81 mph)	09/1937-10/1937	30	49,000	
Vivastella	ADB5	6/ 4,085	95 @ 3,000	130 km/h (81 mph)	10/1937-07/1938	269	-	Plus 13 of the British market BDN1 version and one of the British market BDN2 version
Vivastella	BDZ1	6/ 4,085	95 @ 3,000	130 km/h (81 mph)	09/1938-10/1939	358	56,000	Plus 2 of the British market BDY1 version
