= Renault Vivasix =

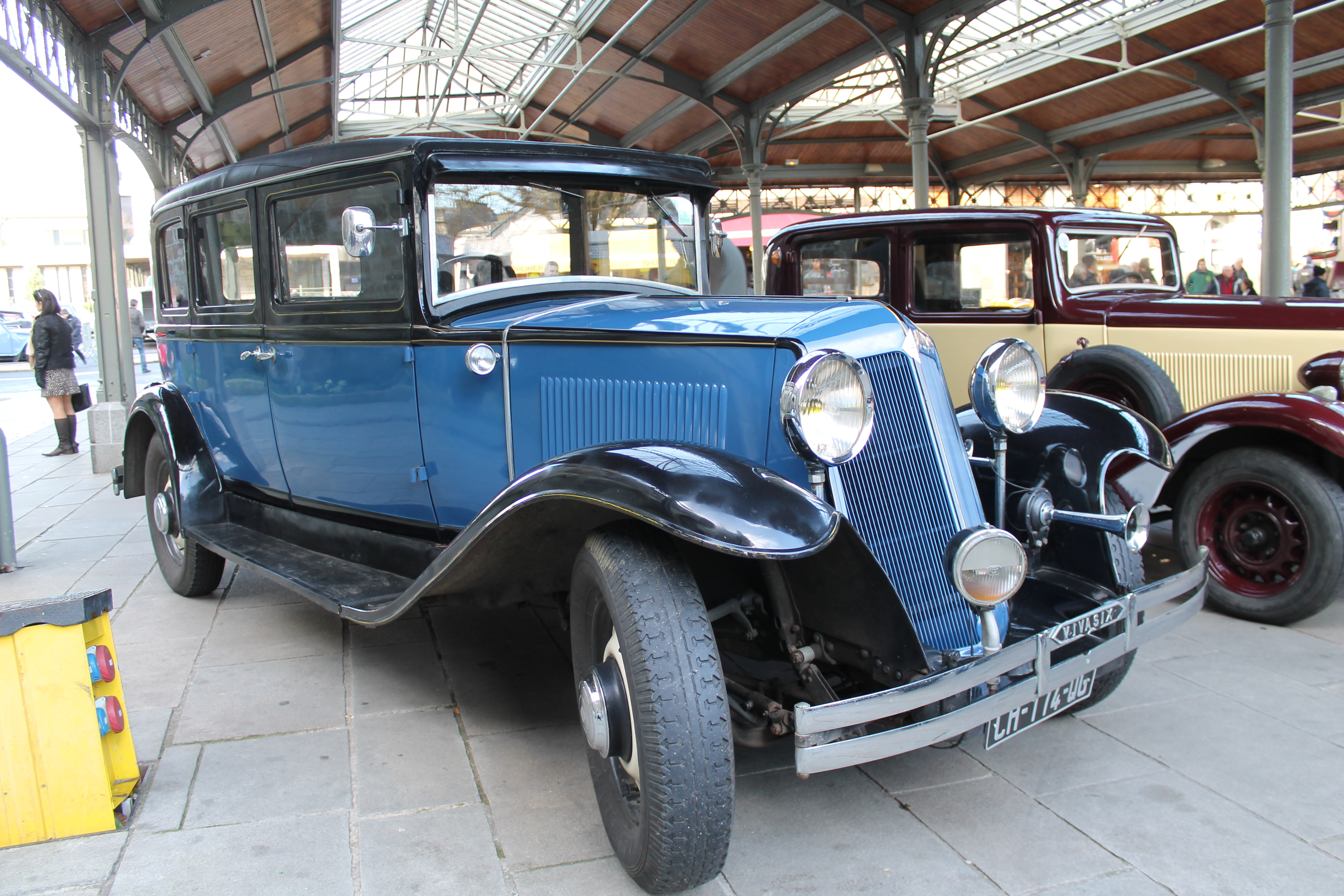

Overview
- Manufacturer: Renault
- Also called: Renault Type RA; Renault Type PG
- Production: 1926–1930
- Assembly: France Île Seguin, Boulogne-Billancourt, Paris
- Designer: Louis Renault

Body and chassis
- Class: Full-size car
- Body style: 4-door Sedan; 2-door Coupe
- Layout: FR layout

Powertrain
- Engine: straight-6 3180 cc, 52 CV
- Transmission: 3-speed manual

Dimensions
- Wheelbase: 3,110–3,260 mm (122.4–128.3 in)
- Length: 4,500 mm (177.2 in)
- Width: 1,700 mm (66.9 in)
- Curb weight: 1,700 kg (3,748 lb)

Chronology
- Predecessor: Renault Type JT; Renault Type KR
- Successor: Renault Vivastella

The Renault Vivasix was a full-size car manufactured by the French car company Renault between 1926 and 1930. In 1930 the Vivasix was replaced by the Vivastella.

== Details and evolutions ==
In 1927 Renault created two new models, one luxury and expensive called "Type RA" and a second, simpler model called "Type PG". The two models together were known as the Vivasix. The Vivasix model was one of the larger cars produced by Renault in that period.

The "Type RA" and the "Type PG" were replaced by a new luxury car called the Renault Vivastella between 1928 and 1929.

The top speed of the Vivasix was 130 km/h (81 mph).

== Types ==
- PG1 from 1926 to 1929
- PG3 only 1930

== International market ==
In 1931, Renault Motors reported that the latest models of the Renault Vivasix were selling well in Shanghai.

== Gallery ==
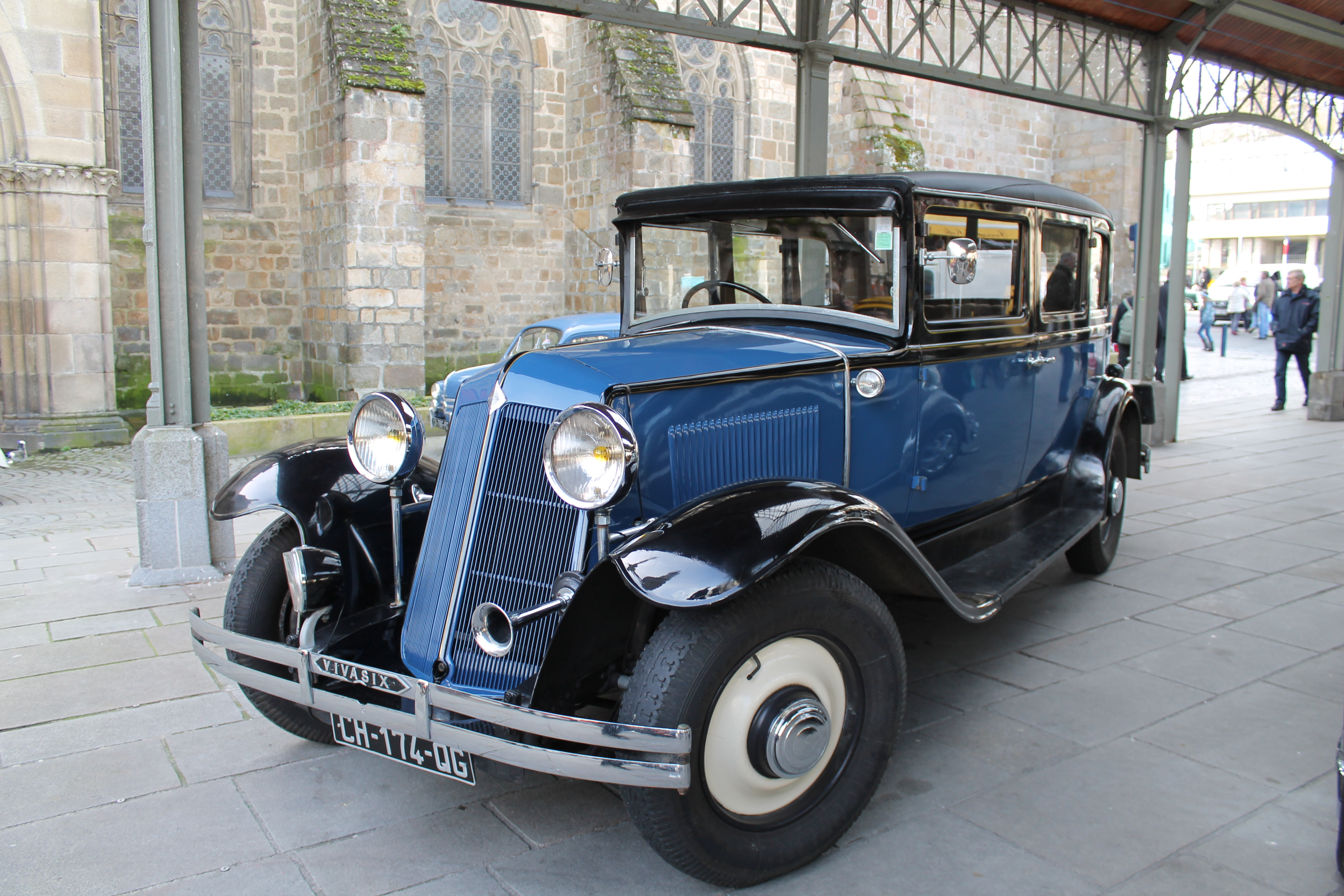
