= Renault 40CV =

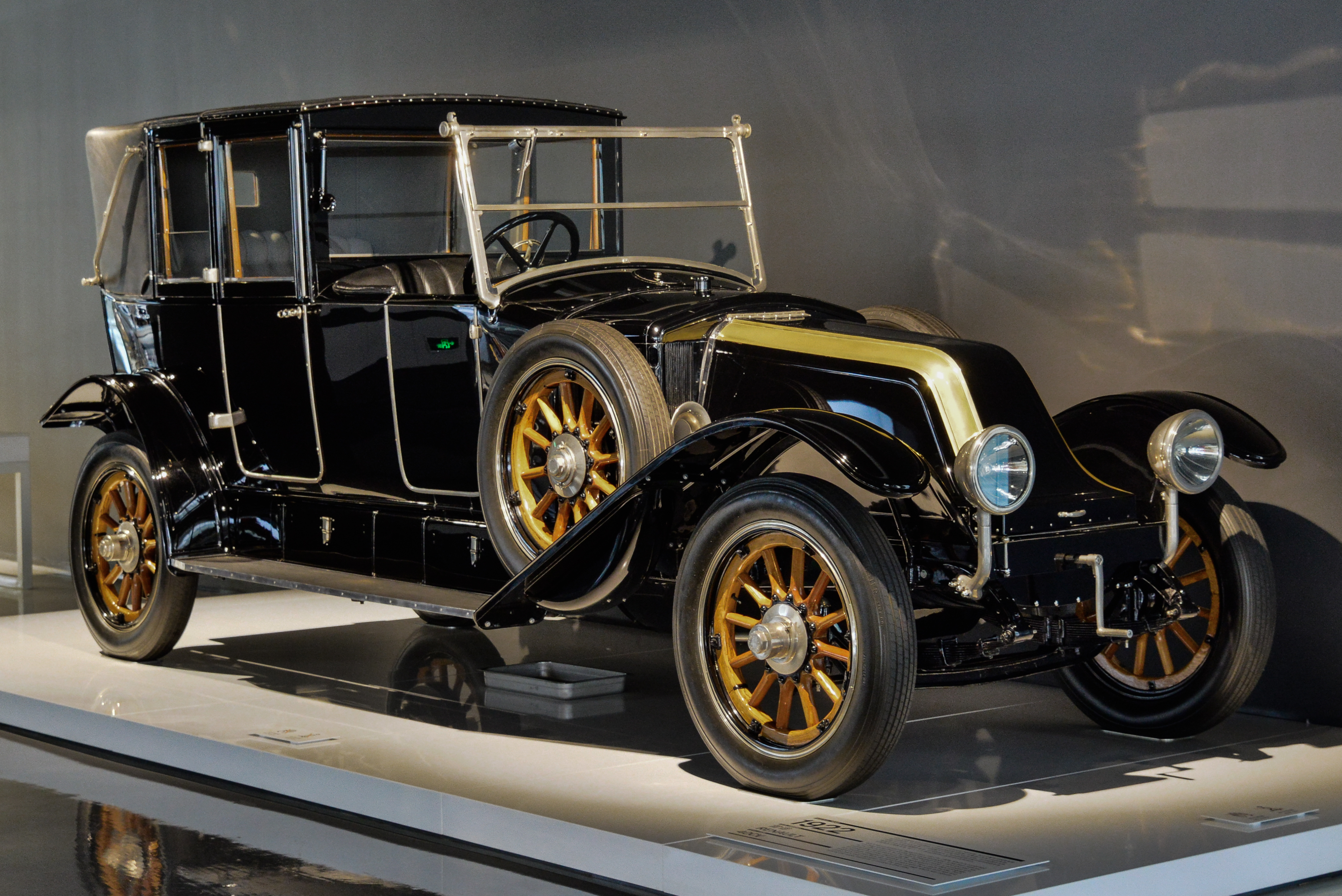
- 1922 Renault 40 CV Type MC Sedan de Ville

Overview
- Manufacturer: Renault
- Production: 1911–1928
- Assembly: Boulogne-Billancourt, Paris
- Designer: Louis Renault

Body and chassis
- Class: Full-size luxury car

Powertrain
- Engine: 7.5 L and 9.1 L Straight 6

Dimensions
- Wheelbase: 3.6m or 3.9m

Chronology
- Successor: Renault Reinastella

The Renault 40CV is a full-size luxury car produced by the French vehicle manufacturer Renault from 1911 to 1928.

It was sold in many variations which were known by two letter names such as the CG, ES and JP. Originally launched with a 6-cylinder 7.5-litre engine (7,539 cc (460 cu in)), this was replaced by a larger 9.1-litre 9,120 cc (557 cu in) engine when the "Type HF" version of the 40CV replaced the "Type HD" version in August 1920. In 1922 the 40CV was fitted with a hydraulic servo-brake system. The 40 CV was replaced by the Renault Reinastella in 1928.

A 40CV won the Monte Carlo Rally in 1925, and a modified single-seater NM became well known in 1926 for being able to cover 80.5 kilometres (50 mi) at a speed of 190 km/h (118.1 mph) and broke the 24-hour record by covering 4,167.57 km (2,589.6 mi) at an average speed of 173.6 km/h (107.9 mph).

Between 1920 and 1928 the Renault 40CV served as official transport for French presidents Alexandre Millerand and Gaston Doumergue, replacing a role previously filled by the Panhard 20CV.
