= Renault Suprastella =

Overview
- Manufacturer: Renault
- Production: 1938–1942
- Assembly: Île Seguin, Boulogne-Billancourt, Paris

Body and chassis
- Class: Luxury car
- Body style: Large Limousine
- Layout: FR layout

Powertrain
- Engine: 5448 cc I8, 110 hp (82 kW)

Dimensions
- Wheelbase: 3,210 mm (126.4 in) (Type ABM8 "châssis normal"); 3,720 mm (146.5 in) (Type BDP1 "châssis extra-long")
- Length: 5,090 mm (200.4 in) to 5,600 mm (220.5 in)

Chronology
- Predecessor: Renault Nervastella

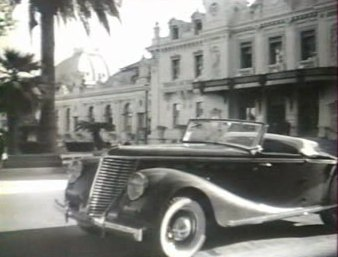
1938 Renault Suprastella in La Fin du Jour, Movie, 1939

The Renault Suprastella is a large car that was introduced by Renault in the Spring of 1938 as a replacement for the Renault Nervastella from which it inherited its mechanical elements and many other essential characteristics.

In the early 1930s, Renault introduced several models with names that ended in "-stella", which was a conscious reference to the Latin word for a "star", and "suprastella means "star above".

== Background ==
The Suprastella was intended primarily as a large limousine, although cabriolet and coupé versions were also listed. The intention was to produce the car in bare chassis form for dedicated coachbuilders to fit their own bespoke bodies: typically the car was 5600 mm long. The car was intended to demonstrate that France could still build high-end luxury cars, but because of the way history turned out the Suprastella was the last of this line, and Renault would emerge from the Second World War as a state-owned manufacturer of small cars.

Two cars were assembled in London, England

A new feature was a wrap-around front grille of horizontal bars. The design was regarded by some commentators as a move towards a more vulgar "look" that would become a general feature across the Renault range during 1939.

Prices through in 1938 ranged from 84,000 francs for the large steel saloon with its 3210 mm wheelbase to 102,000 Francs for the longer 3720 mm wheelbase eight-seater limousine version. This placed the Suprastella towards the higher end of the price bracket occupied, with their "standard" coachbuilt bodies, by luxury automakers such as Delage and Delahaye, although buyers of these cars often had bodies designed independently by specialist coachbuilders and could easily spend considerably more.

The Suprastella was powered by a traditional flathead 8-cylinder in-line engine of 5448 cc which had already appeared, towards the end of its production run, in the Nervastella. Maximum power was listed at 110 PS (81 kW) at 2,800 rpm, and claimed top speed was between 135 km/h (84 mph) and 145 km/h (90 mph), according to the chassis length and body type specified.

== Official use ==
A 6500 mm long version of the Suprastella, using the longer 3720 mm wheelbase, became one of the most photographed cars in France during the 1940s. This was a cabriolet-bodied limousine with coachwork by Franay, delivered to the government in 1943 after it was decided that Marshal Pétain needed a new state car. The car had high ground clearance, and one unusual feature was the step beneath each door that folded out automatically when the door was opened.

The car performed its function for Pétain, and in April 1944, it was photographed containing him on his first visit as a leader to Paris. Better-known images of the state Suprastella date from August 1944 when General de Gaulle, having succeeded in entering Paris ahead of the American army, toured the city while standing in the rear part of the car and accompanied by General Lattre de Tassigny. The car survived to serve the Fourth Republic, taken into government service by President Auriol.

== Types ==
- ABM8 (long)
- BDP1 (extra-long)
