= Île Seguin =

Island in the Seine river, France

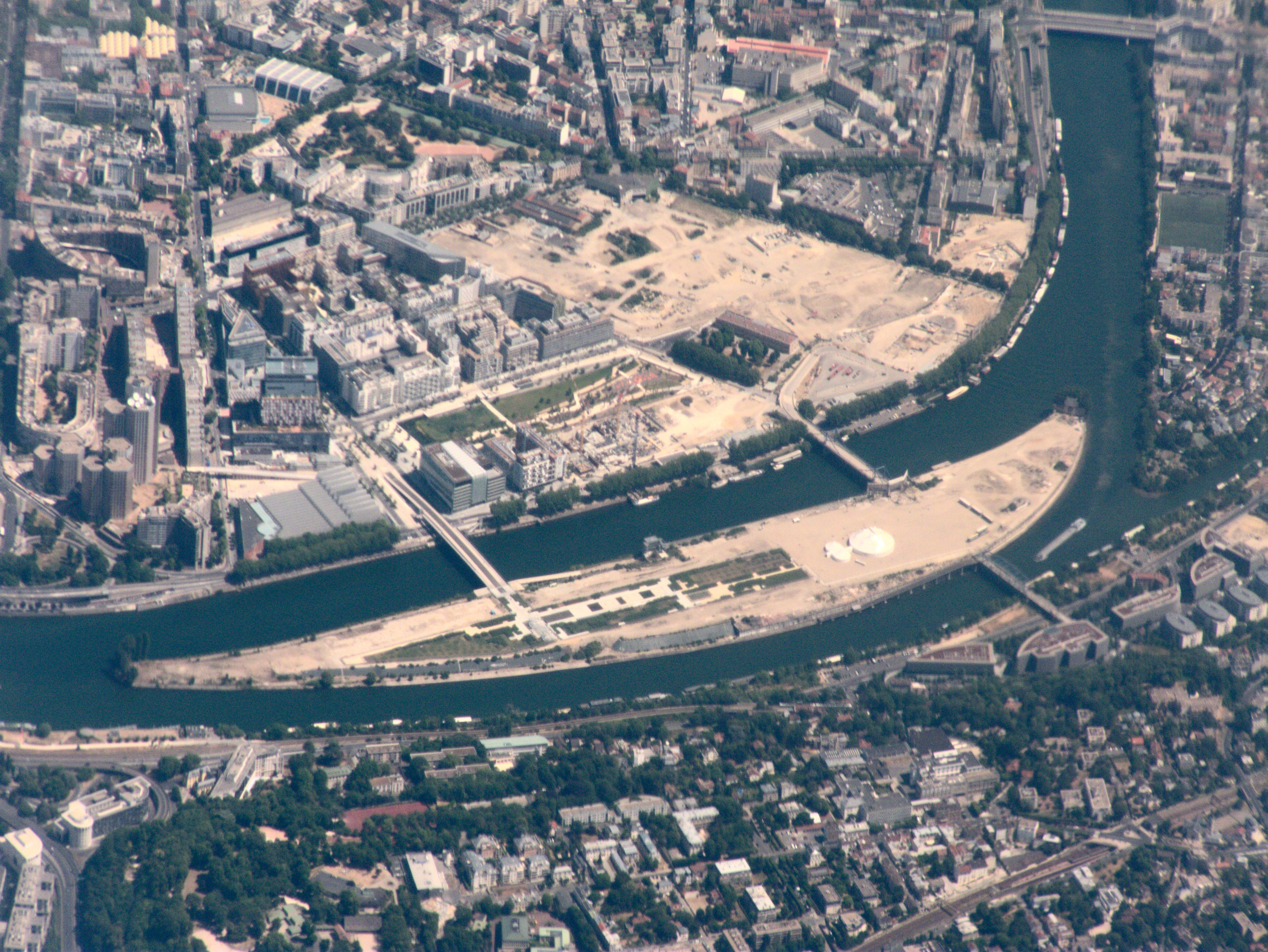
- Île Seguin in 2011

- Location within Paris

Geography
- Location: Seine
- Coordinates: 48°49′25.61″N 2°13′59.67″E

Administration
- France

Île Seguin (French pronunciation: [il səɡɛ̃], Seguin Island) is an island on the Seine river between Boulogne-Billancourt and Sèvres, in the west suburbs of Paris, France. It has a surface area of approximately 11.5 hectares (28 acres), and is positioned opposite Meudon, a short distance downstream from the Île Saint-Germain. Administratively Meudon and the island are included as part of Boulogne-Billancourt, on the river's right bank, rather than of Sèvres on the left bank.

During most of the twentieth century, Île Seguin was home to a Renault factory, covering virtually the whole island. The last car from the Renault production line was a 1992 Renault 5 Supercinq. The factory remained dormant until 2005 when all the buildings were demolished.

The architect Jean Nouvel was appointed in 2009 as the lead planner to transform the island into a new cultural hub. The first permanent concert and performance spaces in the project, known as La Seine Musicale, were opened in April 2017. Hotels, large offices, art spaces, and a cinema will follow.

== History ==
=== Before Renault ===
Before the seventeenth century the island was owned by the Abbey of St. Victor and the land was cultivated by tenant farmers.

The island's importance received a sudden boost at the end of the seventeenth century with the construction of the Palace of Versailles in the department of Versailles, because it was positioned along the route that connected the new palace with Paris. The road was much frequented by itinerant aristocrats. In 1747 the palace builder's grandson, Louis XV, acquired the island - then known as the "Île de Sève", on behalf of his daughters. The island found itself renamed as the "Île Madame", and during the pre-revolutionary decades it was home to a commercial laundry, the "Buanderie de Sèvres".

Under the revolutionary government the laundry was nationalised and the island fell under direct state control. In 1793, briefly, it was owned by a banker called Jean-Baptiste Vandenyver, but he was guillotined a few months later. Control of the island was then disputed, in the broader context of the redrawing of the Paris city limits, between the three municipalities/districts of Sèvres, Issy and Auteuil. In 1794 the island was acquired by the entrepreneurial chemist, Armand Seguin, from whom it takes its name. Seguin became extremely rich, in part by using his island to construct a factory applying a new approach to tanning leather, on an industrial scale. The island also continued to be home to laundry businesses.

During the closing decades of the nineteenth century, while retaining its industrial businesses, the island also became a leisure destination, used for recreational boating, clay pigeon shooting and angling.

=== The Renault factory ===
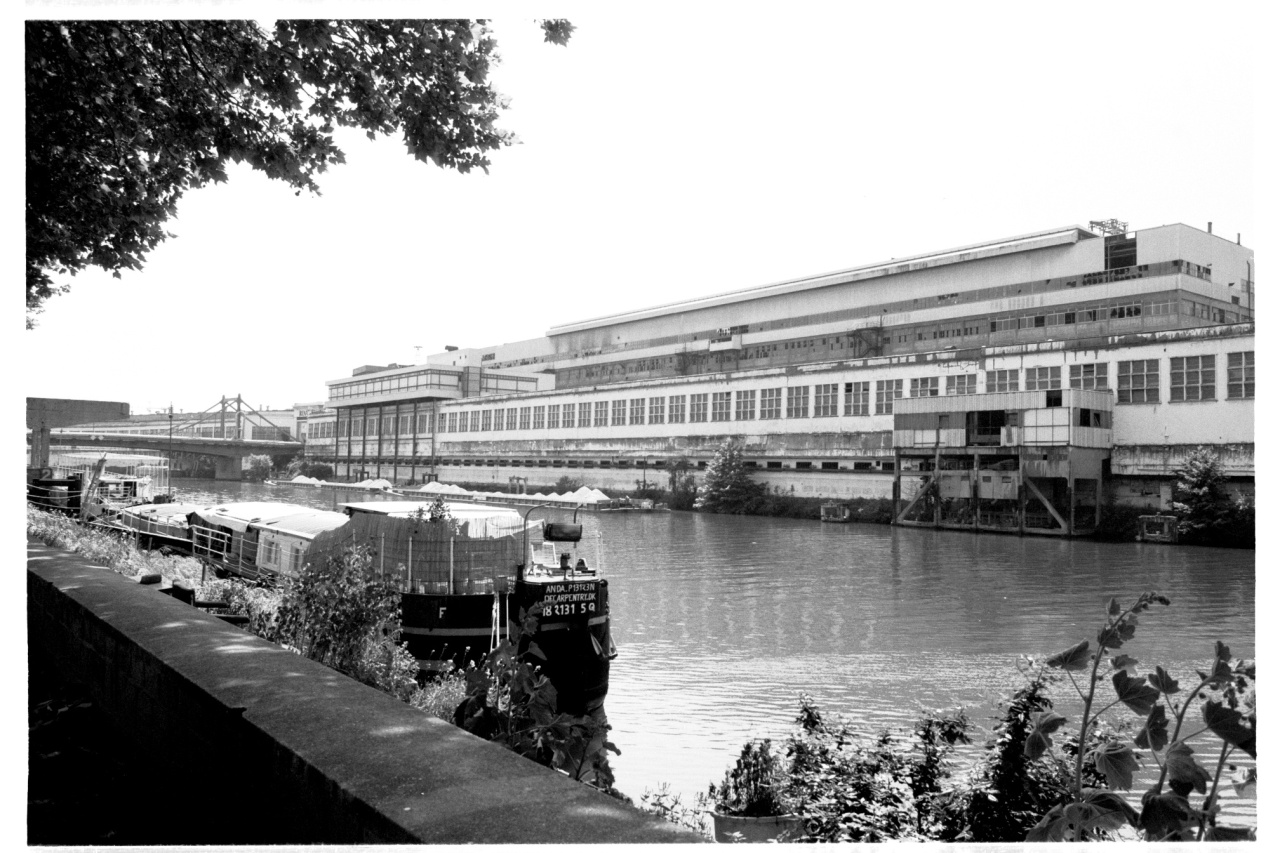
The former Renault factory

Louis Renault, a founder and the energetic hands-on owner of the "Société des Automobiles Renault", was one of several major automakers to have expanded production (of military supplies) and to have prospered during the First World War. At this point he already controlled factories on both banks of the river, and in 1919 he acquired the Île Seguin in the middle of it. In 1911, Renault visited Henry Ford at the Highland Park factory while the Ford River Rouge Complex was being conceived and constructed.

Renault built his first factory on the island between 1929 and 1934. For the rest of the twentieth century the island's history would be the history of the Renault plant. The factory was self-sufficient, with its own electric power generation facilities and several testing sites including an underground test track. Infrastructure also included dock facilities necessary for taking delivery of bulk supplies and for transporting finished automobiles by river. Billancourt became France's largest factory, employing more than 30,000 people. During the Second World War the factory, which was at this time being used to produce trucks for the Germans, was an easy target for bomber pilots using the River Seine to navigate, and suffered from several destructive allied bombings attacks. Renault himself was accused of collaboration directly after the war, and in the frenzied atmosphere of retribution that characterized the post-liberation period he died in prison under suspicious circumstances, and without benefiting from the trial which had been intended for him. His company was placed under the direction of a well-connected resistance hero, and then, on 15 January 1945 nationalised and renamed "Régie nationale des usines Renault (RNUR)"

France had missed out on the economic recovery that had boosted prosperity in Britain and Germany during the 1930s, but she participated fully in the sustained post-war boom that got going in the 1950s. The Renault plant on the Île Seguin became, at this time, a beacon for the growth and modernisation of French industry, reflecting the success of models such as the Renault 4CV launched in 1947, which would be the first French car to break through the "one million" threshold. The factory also continued to justify its reputation, established during the turbulence of the mid-1930s, as a bastion of trades union militancy, notably being closed down by a 33-day strike during the "Événements"("Events") of May 1968.

Growth in the 1950s and 1960s enabled Renault to open several newer car plants on greenfield sites in France, Spain and, later, further afield. Rising wages, union militancy (especially in the big car plants of the Paris region) and high employment taxes encouraged the French auto-industry to become a pioneer of automated vehicle assembly and the Billancourt factory, designed for an era of labor-intensive production processes, was hard to adapt to the new techniques. Renault announced in 1989 that the factory would close and Billancourt's last car, a Renault Supercinq, emerged on 31 March 1992. A major clean-up of the buildings began almost at once, but the challenge was formidable, especially with regard to the necessary asbestos removal and soil decontamination. Destruction of the factory buildings began only on 29 March 2004, and was completed on 8 March 2005.

=== After Renault ===
In 2004 Francois Pinault proposed to build on the island a private museum, designed by Tadao Ando, to display his Pinault Collection of art. This was cancelled by environmental and planning objections; in 2021 some of the art will be shown at the Bourse de commerce in central Paris.

The architect Jean Nouvel was appointed in 2009 as the lead planner to transform the island into a new cultural hub. The first permanent concert and performance spaces in the project, known as La Seine Musicale, were opened in April 2017. The local community group, Le Collectif "Vue sur l'Île Seguin" argues the undeveloped parts of the island should remain as 'green' and vegetated as possible, given the high density of the surrounding suburbs. They have opposed a large office development planned by Bouygues Immobilier, Project Vivaldi, for the centre of the island, arguing Paris is already oversupplied with office space and the developers are committing "ecocide". Their petition gained 53,000 signatures by 2018.

== Bridges ==
At the time of the factory, the island was accessible from two metal bridges (a suspension bridge designed by Daydé in 1928 linked the island to the right bank of the river Seine and another bridge designed by Seibert in 1931 with the left bank).

The new Renault bridge designed by Italian architect Marc Barani was inaugurated in 2009.

== In popular culture ==
The Renault factory on the island was the inspiration behind the factory shown in the French animated television series Code Lyoko which aired from 2003 to 2007, which housed the supercomputer that the titular digital world was created on underneath it.
