= Y-Type =

Y-Type or Type Y may refer to:

- MG Y-type, a car
- Alexander Y Type, a bus
- Renault Type Y, an early car
- AEC Y Type, a truck
- Y-type dwarf, an astronomical object
- Type Y, a European copper tubing standard
- Type Y, one of the UIC passenger coach types
