= Sedan (automobile) =

Passenger car in a three-box configuration

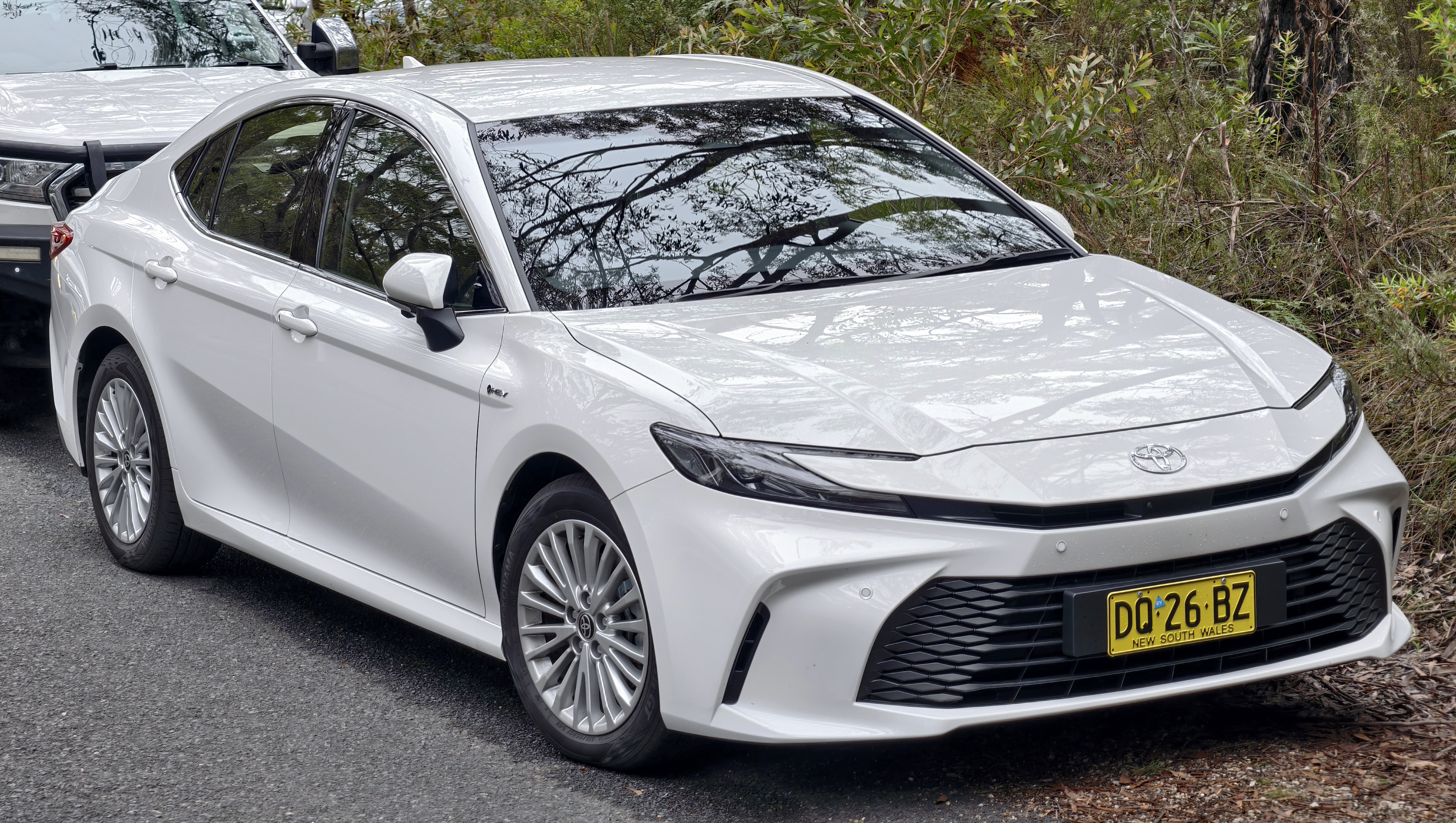
2025 Toyota Camry 4-door sedan

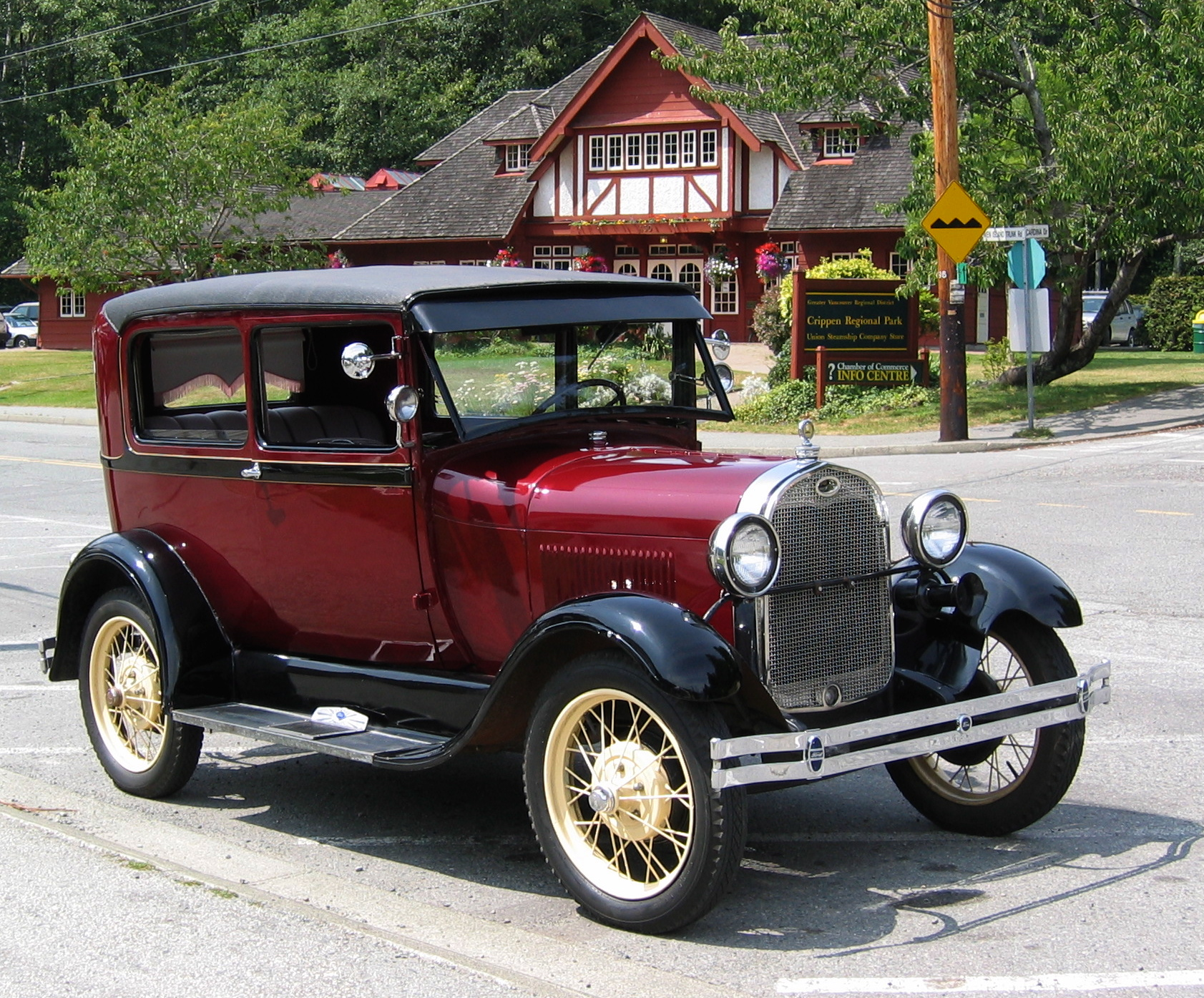
1928 Ford Model A Tudor sedan

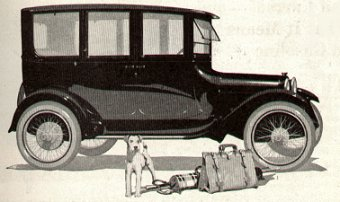
World's first all-steel sedan made by Budd for Dodge Bros, 1919

A sedan (American English), or saloon (British English), is a passenger car in a three-box configuration with separate compartments for an engine, passengers, and cargo. Variations of the sedan style include the close-coupled sedan, club sedan, convertible sedan, fastback sedan, hardtop sedan, notchback sedan, and sedanet.

The sedan name derives from the 17th-century litter known as a "sedan chair", a one-person enclosed box with windows carried by porters. The first recorded use of the term sedan to describe an automobile body style occurred in 1912.

== Definition ==
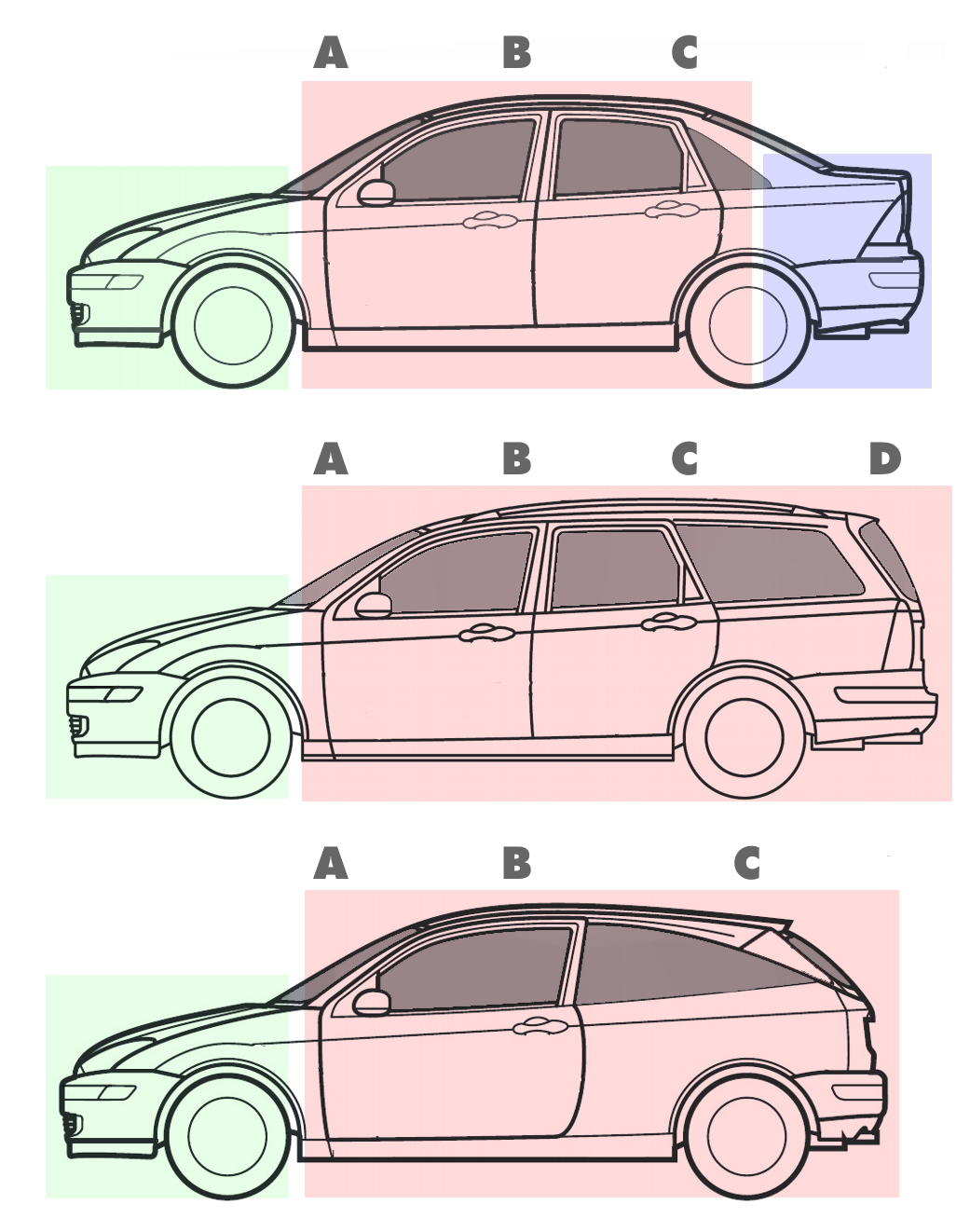
Profiles of a sedan, station wagon and hatchback versions of the same model (a Ford Focus)

A sedan (/sɪˈdæn/) is a car with a closed body (i.e., a fixed metal roof) with the engine, passengers, and cargo in separate compartments. This broad definition does not differentiate sedans from various other car body styles. In practice, the typical characteristics of sedans include the following:

- A B-pillar (between the front and rear windows) that supports the roof.
- Two rows of seats for passengers.
- A three-box design with the engine at the front and the cargo area at the rear, although many exceptions exist.
- A less steeply sloping roofline than a coupé results in increased headroom for rear passengers and a less streamlined appearance.
- A rear interior volume of at least 33 ft^{3} (0.93 m^{3}).

It is sometimes suggested that sedans must have four doors (to provide a simple distinction between sedans and two-door coupés); others state that a sedan can have four or two doors. Although the sloping rear roofline defined the coupe, the design element has become common on many body styles with manufacturers increasingly "cross-pollinating" the style so that terms such as sedan and coupé have been loosely interpreted as "'four-door coupes' - an inherent contradiction in terms."

When a manufacturer produces two-door and four-door sedan versions of the same model, the shape and position of the greenhouse on both versions may be identical, with only the B-pillar positioned further back to accommodate the longer doors on the two-door versions.

== Etymology ==
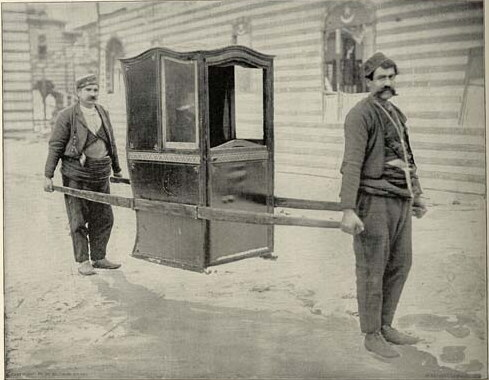
Turkish sedan chair from a historical exhibition

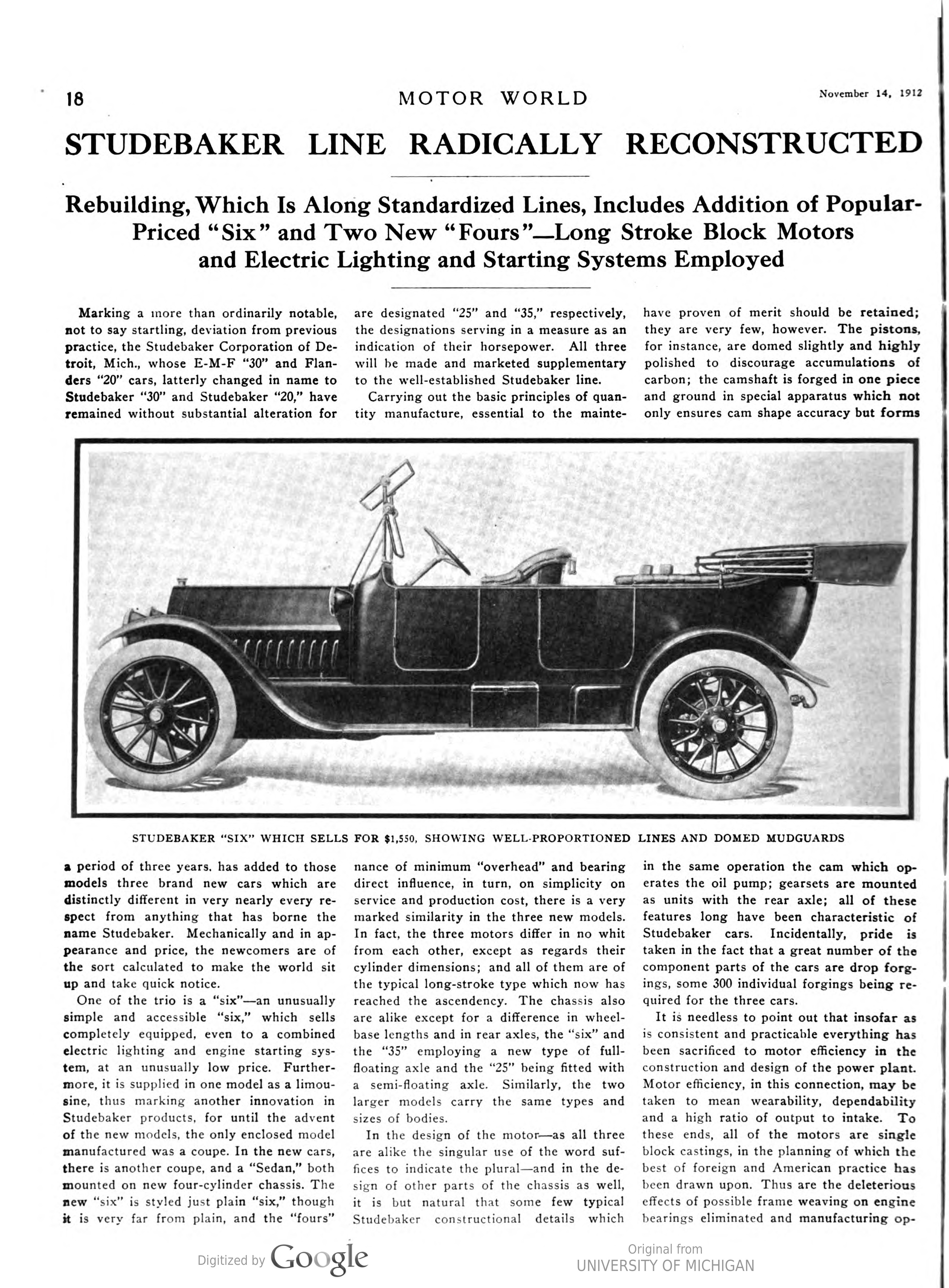
Article about the Studebaker models in Motor World, November 14, 1912

The term "sedan" as applied to automobiles traces its roots to human-powered transport before its adoption by the automotive industry.

The word "sedan" is believed to derive from the Latin word "sedere" and the Proto-Indo-European root meaning "to sit," likely through various Italian dialects.

This etymological origin points to the sedan chair, a sophisticated form of litter that emerged in the 1630s. A sedan chair is an enclosed box, typically fitted with windows, designed for transporting a single seated person. It is carried by porters, one at the front and one at the rear, using horizontal poles. While sedan chairs were developed in the 17th century, the concept of litters for human transport dates back much further, predating ancient Egypt, India, and China.

Before the term "sedan" was formally applied to automobiles, fully enclosed car bodies existed. These early enclosed vehicles drew inspiration from their horse-drawn carriage predecessors, which had their own established terminology. For example, in the United Kingdom, enclosed carriages were known as a brougham, while in France they were described as a berline, and in Italy, a berlina. Since then, "berline" and "berlina" have become the standard terms for sedans in their respective countries.

The precise origin of the first enclosed automobile body is debated. Some sources suggest the 1899 Renault Voiturette Type B as a contender for the "first sedan," given that it is the earliest known car produced with a roof, albeit a two-seat vehicle with an additional external seat for a footman or mechanic. A singular instance of similar coachwork is also documented on a 1900 De Dion-Bouton Type D. However, these early examples often featured limited seating or were unique, one-off constructions.

The first recorded use of the term "sedan" specifically about an automobile body style occurred in 1912. This designation was applied when the Studebaker Four and Studebaker Six models were marketed and described in automotive magazine articles as sedans. This marked the adoption of the term into the burgeoning automotive lexicon.

A sedan is typically described as a fixed-roof passenger car designed to accommodate at least four seats, most often characterized by a "three-box" configuration with separate compartments for the engine, passengers, and cargo. Based on this widely accepted definition, the 1911 Speedwell is often cited as the earliest example of a true sedan. Based in Dayton, Ohio, this automobile manufacturer built a closed, two-door car and named it a "Sedan".

== Global terminology and regulatory definitions ==
Different international jurisdictions and market regions have very different definitions and naming conventions for three-box passenger cars.

=== North America ===
The standard designation in the US and Canada is "sedan." According to federal regulations, the United States Environmental Protection Agency (EPA) defines a sedan based on interior passenger and cargo volume indices rather than physical configurations:

- Minicompact: The combined passenger and cargo volume is less than 2.4 m^{3} (85 cu ft).
- Subcompact: 2.4–2.8 m^{3} (85–99.9 cu ft).
- Compact: 2.8–3.1 m^{3} (100–109.9 cu ft).
- Mid-size: 3.1–3.4 m^{3} (110–119.9 cu ft).
- Large / Full-size: at least 3.4 m^{3} (120 cu ft).

=== Commonwealth and the United Kingdom ===
The style is commonly referred to as a "saloon" in British English and in the majority of Commonwealth countries, such as Australia, New Zealand, South Africa, and India. Saloon is only used in formal technical and marketing literature by domestic manufacturers, regulatory organizations like the Society of Motor Manufacturers and Traders (SMMT), and local media like Autocar, while the term sedan is widely understood due to cultural imports.

=== Continental Europe ===
Although the three-box silhouette is defined by certain linguistic terms, vehicles in European markets are categorized using the Euro Car Segment structural framework rather than trunk architecture:

- German-speaking countries: Designated as a Limousine. A "Stretch-Limousine" is a unique designation for a long-wheelbase variant or chauffeured vehicle.
- French-speaking countries: Designated as a Berline.
- Spanish-speaking countries and Italy: Designated as a Berlina.

=== Asia-Pacific area ===
- Japan: Regulated by the Road Vehicles Act. Strict physical dimensions and displacement limitations apply to vehicles (e.g., Standard passenger cars or 3-number cars exceeding 4.7 m (15.4 ft) length or 2.0 L (122 cu in) engine displacement, versus Compact passenger cars or 5-number cars). Traditionally, three-box executive sedans have been classified as either "Sedans" or "Hardtops."
- China: Standardized by National Standard `GB/T 3730.1`, which clearly divides passenger car structures into distinct architectural subsets. Sedan body configurations are designated systematically by length, track width, and volume segments to determine tax brackets managed by the Ministry of Industry and Information Technology.

== Standard styles ==
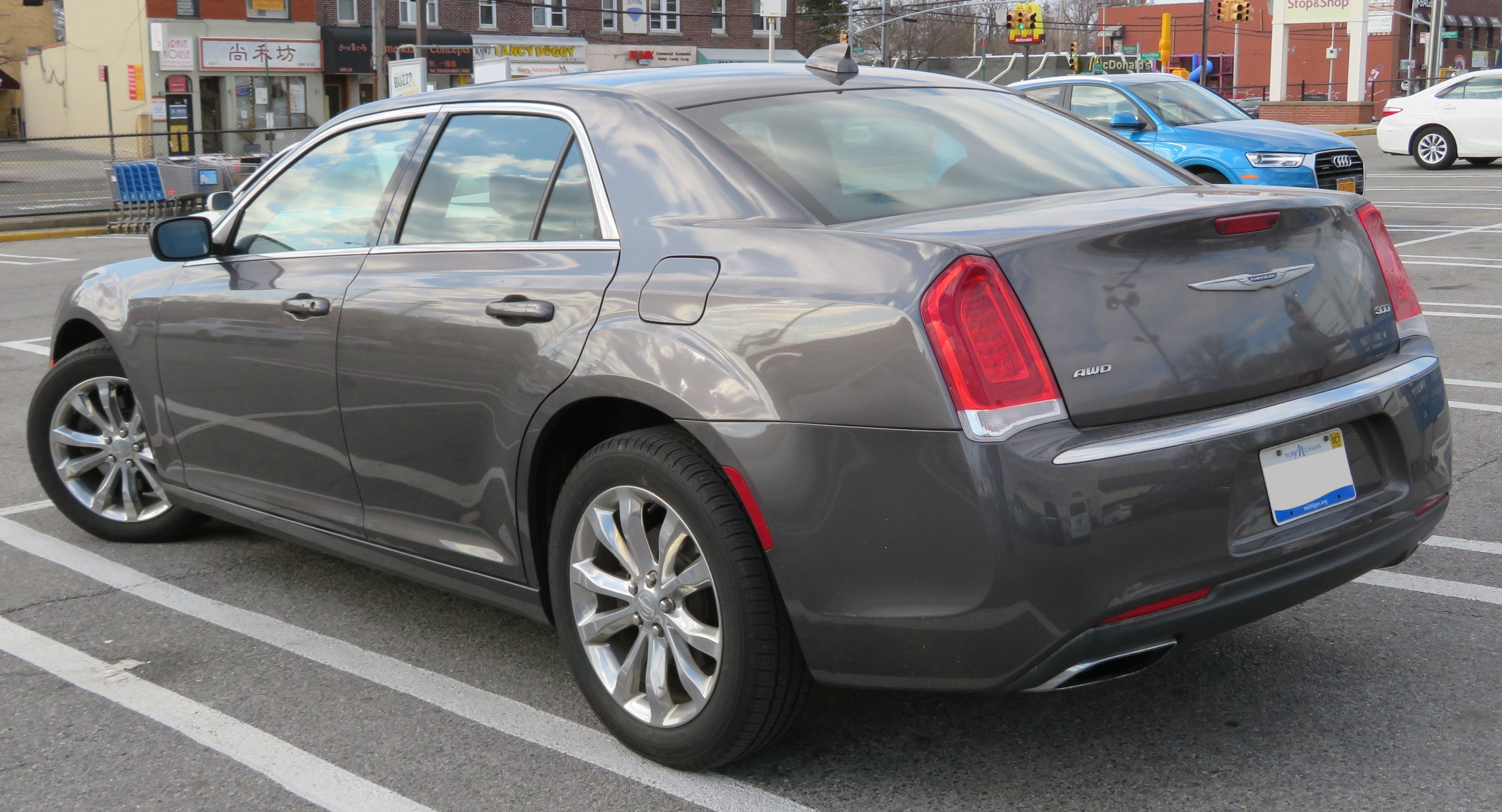
Chrysler 300C notchback sedan

=== Notchback sedans ===
In the United States, the notchback sedan distinguishes models with a horizontal trunk lid. The term is generally only referred to in marketing when it is necessary to differentiate between two sedan body styles (e.g., notchback and fastback) of the same model range.

=== Liftback sedans ===
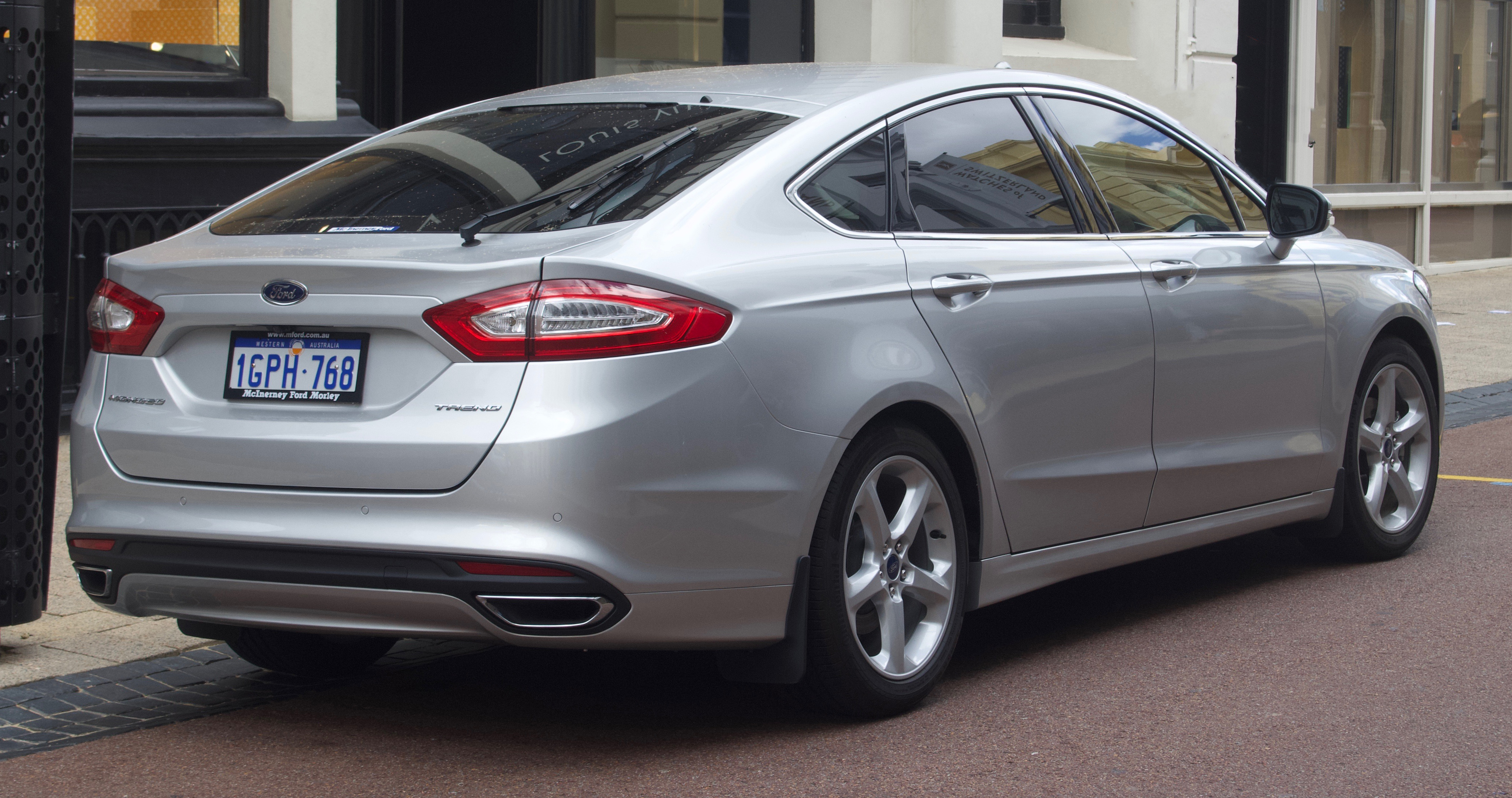
Ford Mondeo liftback.

Several sedans have a fastback profile, but a hatchback-style tailgate is hinged at the roof. Examples include the Peugeot 309, Škoda Octavia, Hyundai Elantra XD, Chevrolet Malibu Maxx, BMW 4 Series Grand Coupe, Audi A5 Sportback, and Tesla Model S. The terms hatchback and sedan are often used to differentiate between body styles of the same model. To avoid confusion, the term hatchback sedan is not often used, but it is a five-door car with a short, sedan-like roof and a large rear hatch. This design, frequently marketed as a fastback or liftback, provides a cargo area that can be expanded by folding down the rear seats. The key difference from a station wagon is the shorter roofline and a more steeply sloping rear. In some European countries, this body style is known as a Kombi-sedan. Due to their compact size and short rear overhang, smaller modern hatchbacks can sometimes be confused with small station wagons.

=== Fastback sedans ===
There have been many sedans with a fastback style with two and four doors. For example, after World War II, Nash Motors introduced revolutionary 1949 designs that featured an innovative, all-enveloping aerodynamic shape named Airflyte that was so unconventional that it earned the nickname "bathtub". The radical design was to minimize wind resistance with a continuous, seamless front to rear bumper design and roof treatment that set a new standard for a fastback sedan. Another example was Volkswagen's two-door Type 3 models differentiated and marketed in the United States as squareback and fastback sedans.

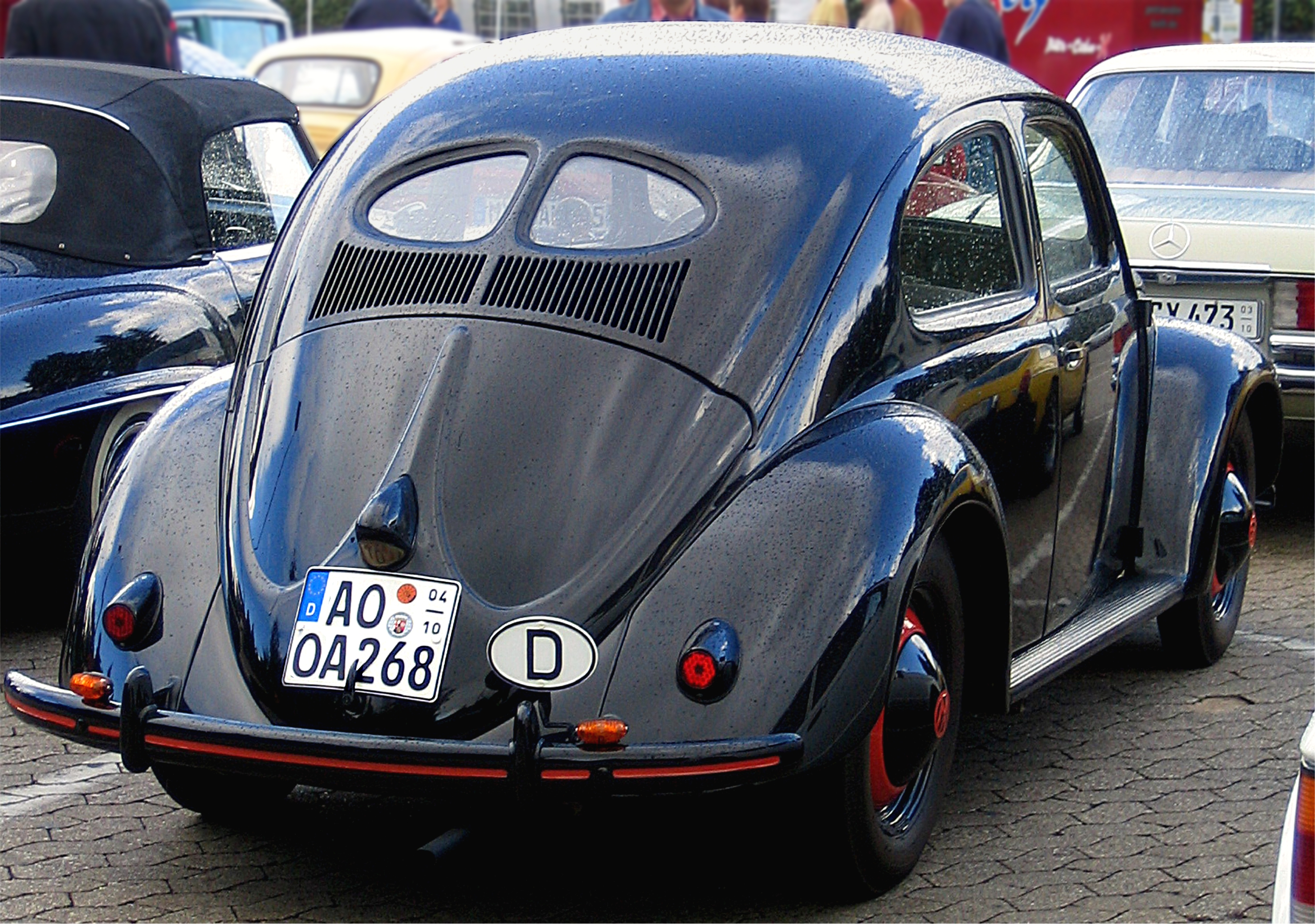
1950 Volkswagen Beetle

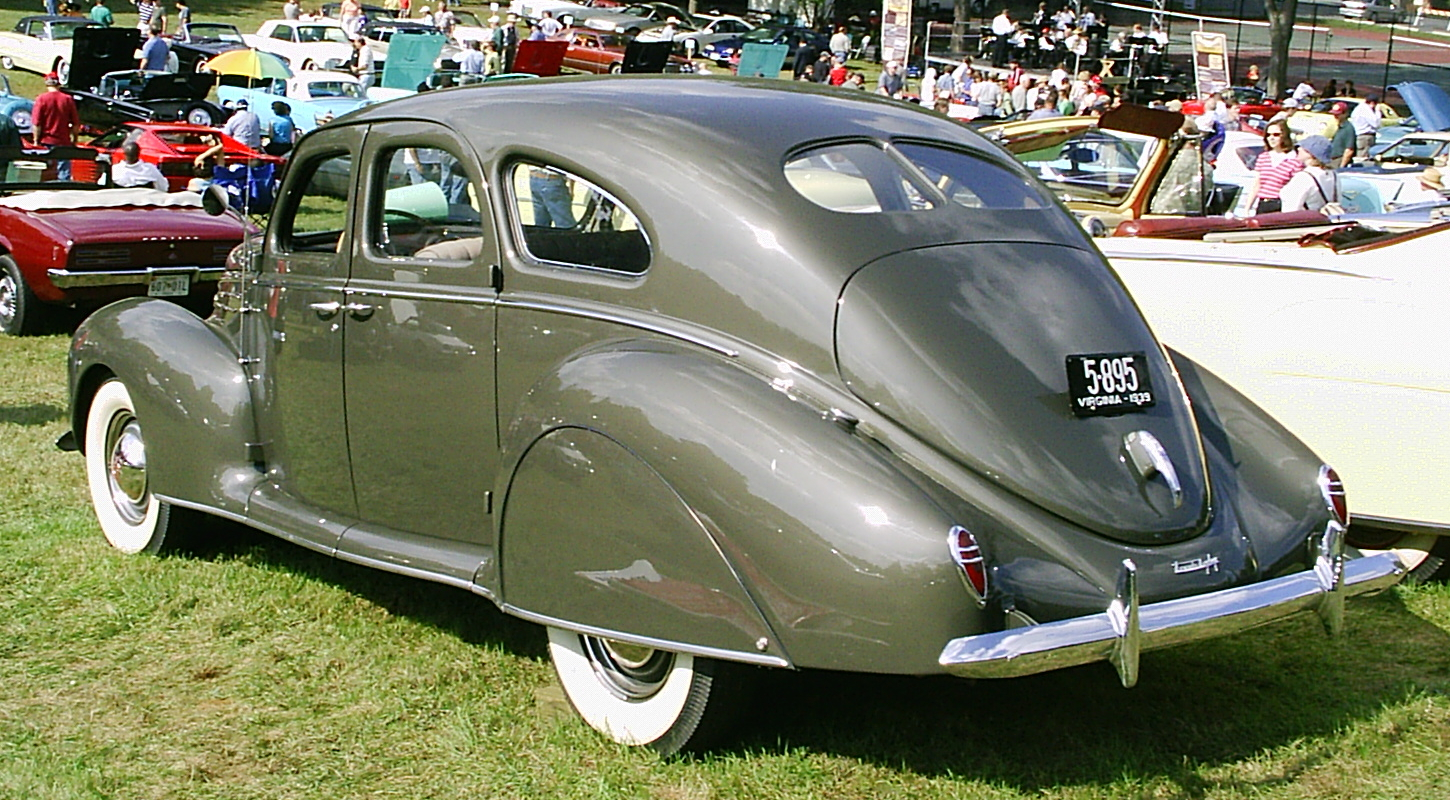
1939 Lincoln-Zephyr

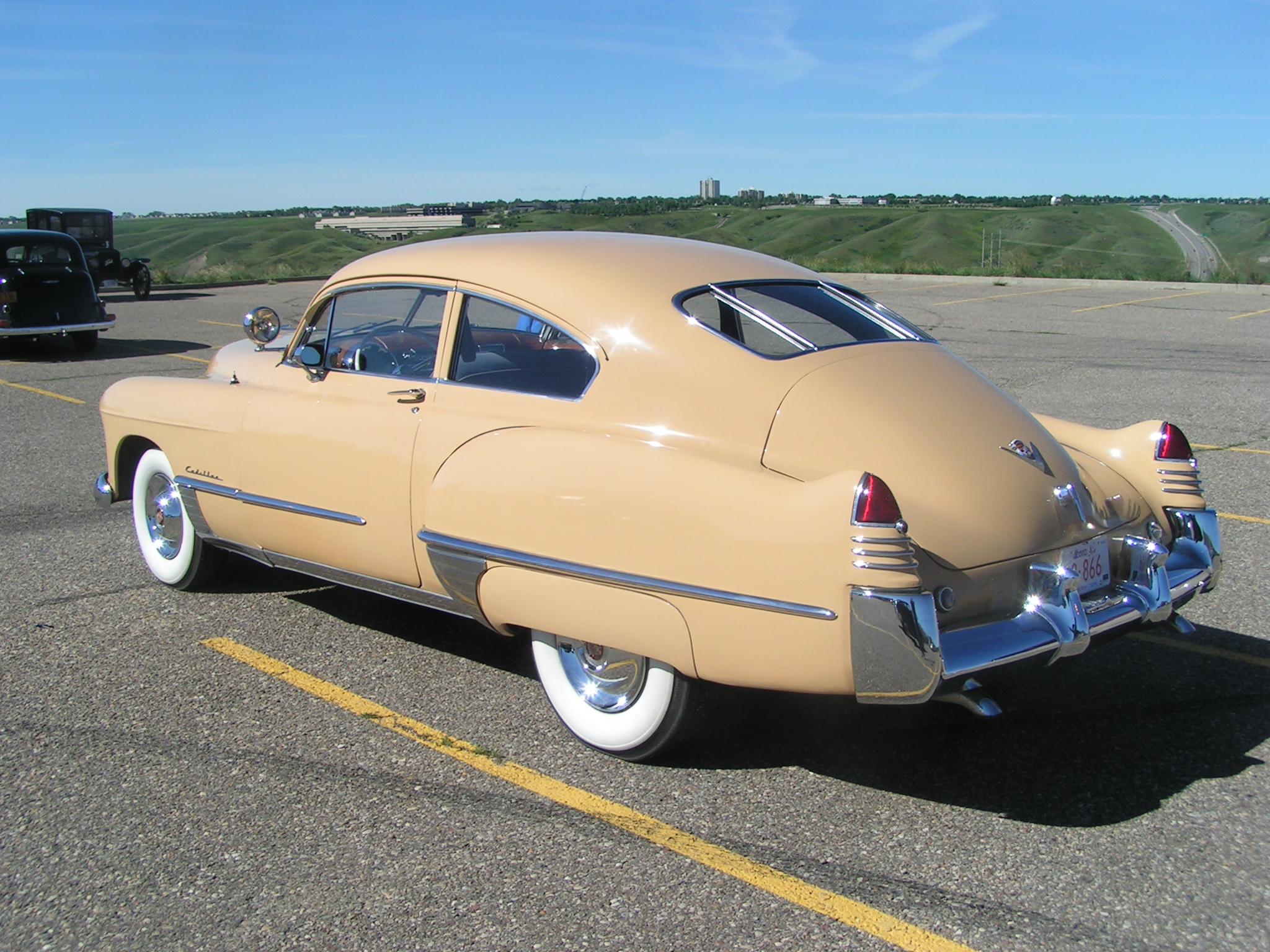
1948 Cadillac Series 62

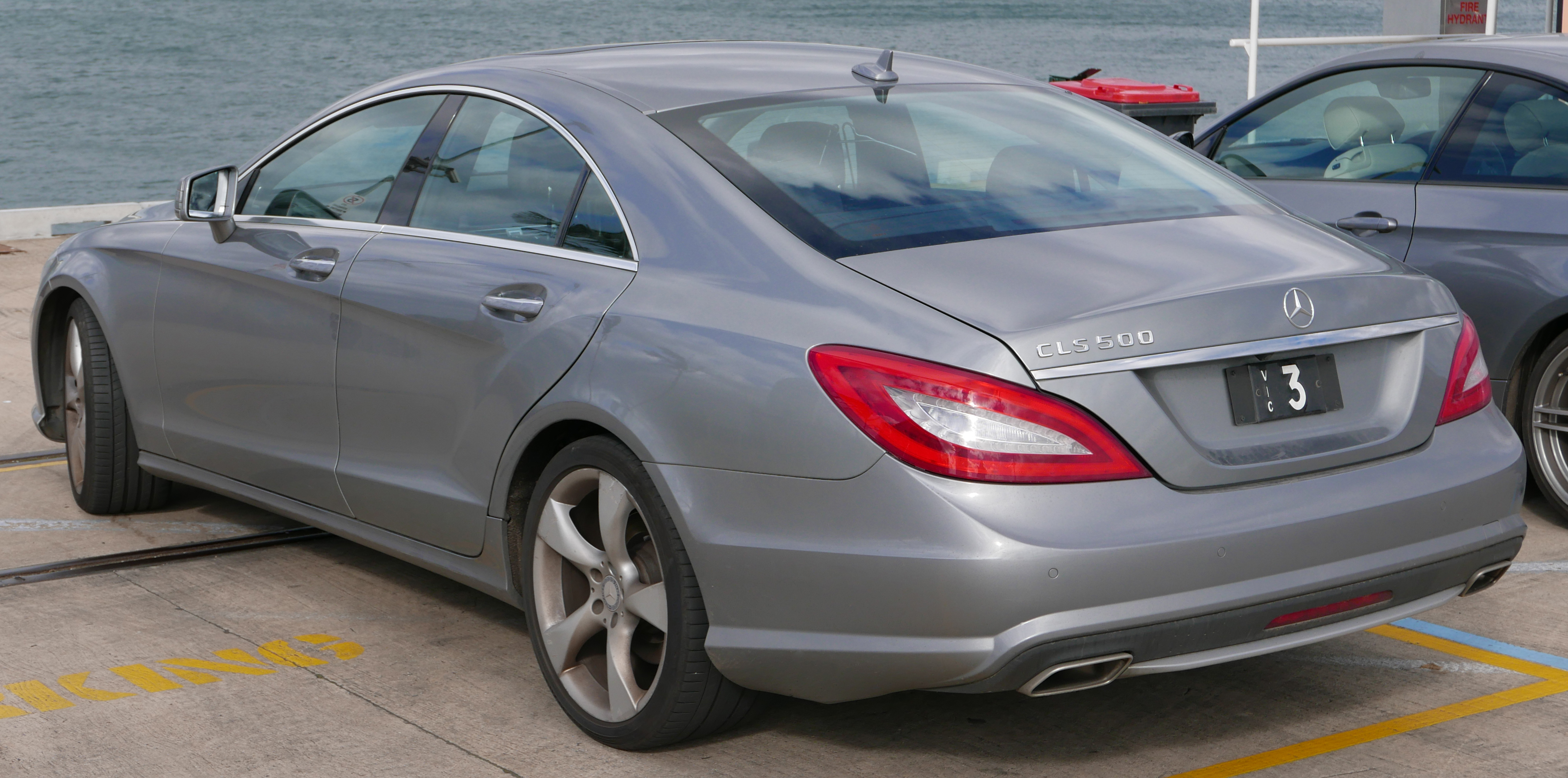
2013 Mercedes-Benz CLS

=== Hardtop sedans ===
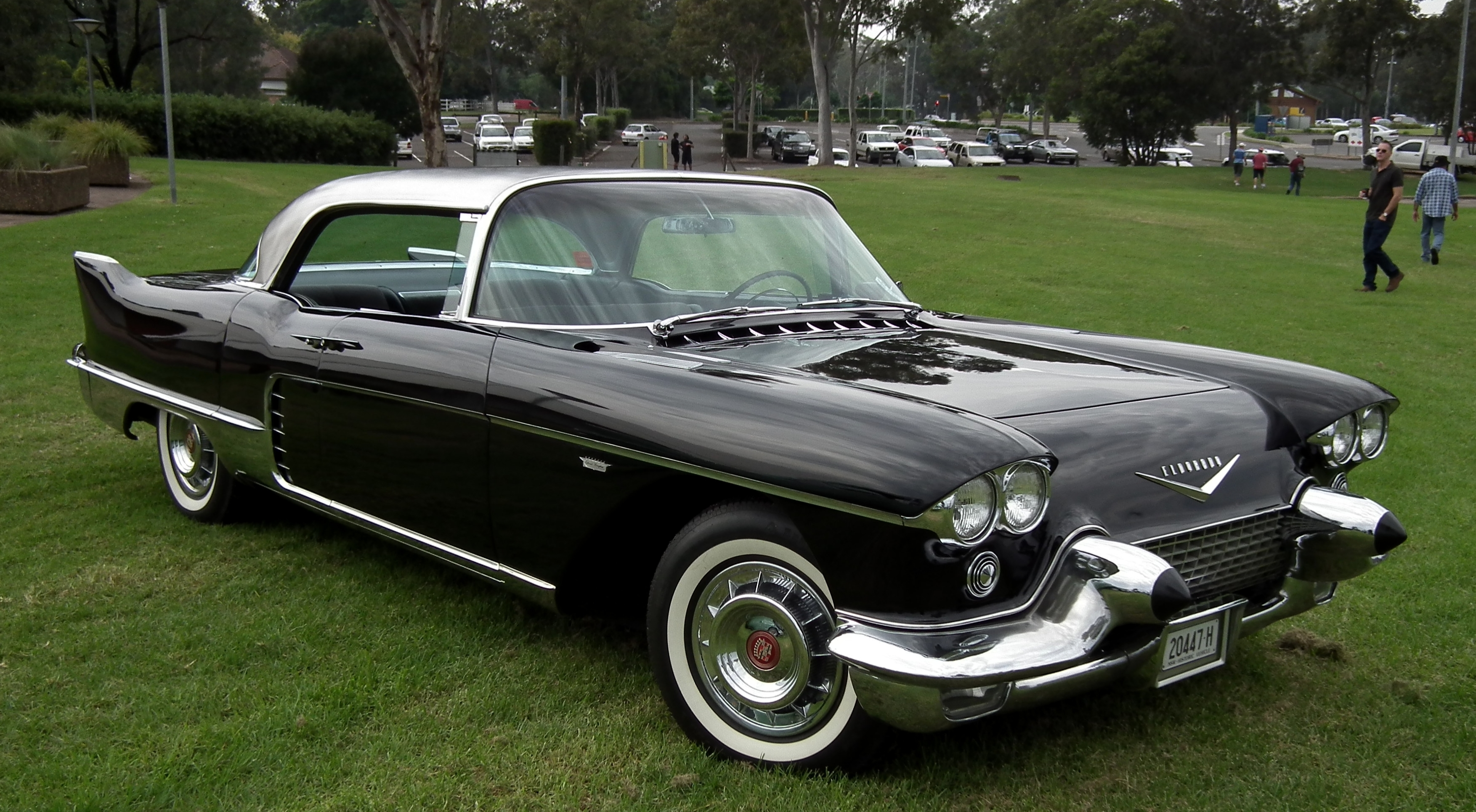
1957 Cadillac Eldorado four-door hardtop

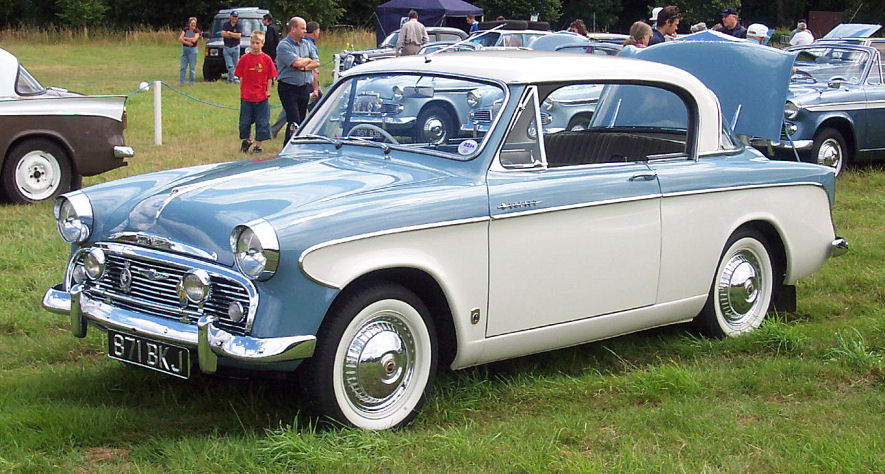
1957 Sunbeam Rapier two-door hardtop

Hardtop sedans were a popular body style in the United States from the 1950s to the 1970s. Hardtops are manufactured without a B-pillar, leaving uninterrupted open space or, when closed, glass along the side of the vehicle. The top was intended to look like a convertible's top. However, it was fixed and made of a rigid material that did not fold.

All manufacturers in the United States from the early 1950s into the 1970s provided at least a two-door hardtop model in their range and a four-door hardtop. The lack of side bracing demanded a strong, heavy chassis frame to combat unavoidable flexing. The pillarless design was also available in four-door models using unibody construction. For example, Chrysler moved to unibody designs for most of its models in 1960, and American Motors Corporation (AMC) offered four-door sedans, as well as a four-door station wagon from 1958 until 1960 in the Rambler and Ambassador series.

In 1973, the US government passed Federal Motor Vehicle Safety Standard 216, creating a required roof strength test to measure the integrity of roof structure in motor vehicles to come into effect some years later. The objective was to reduce deaths and injuries due to the car's roof crushing into the passenger compartment in case of a rollover crash. Hardtop sedan body style production ended with the 1978 Chrysler Newport. Roofs were often available with standard or optional vinyl cover. The structural B-pillar design was minimized by styling methods like matt black finishes. Stylists and engineers soon developed more subtle solutions.

== Mid-20th century variations ==
=== Close-coupled sedans ===
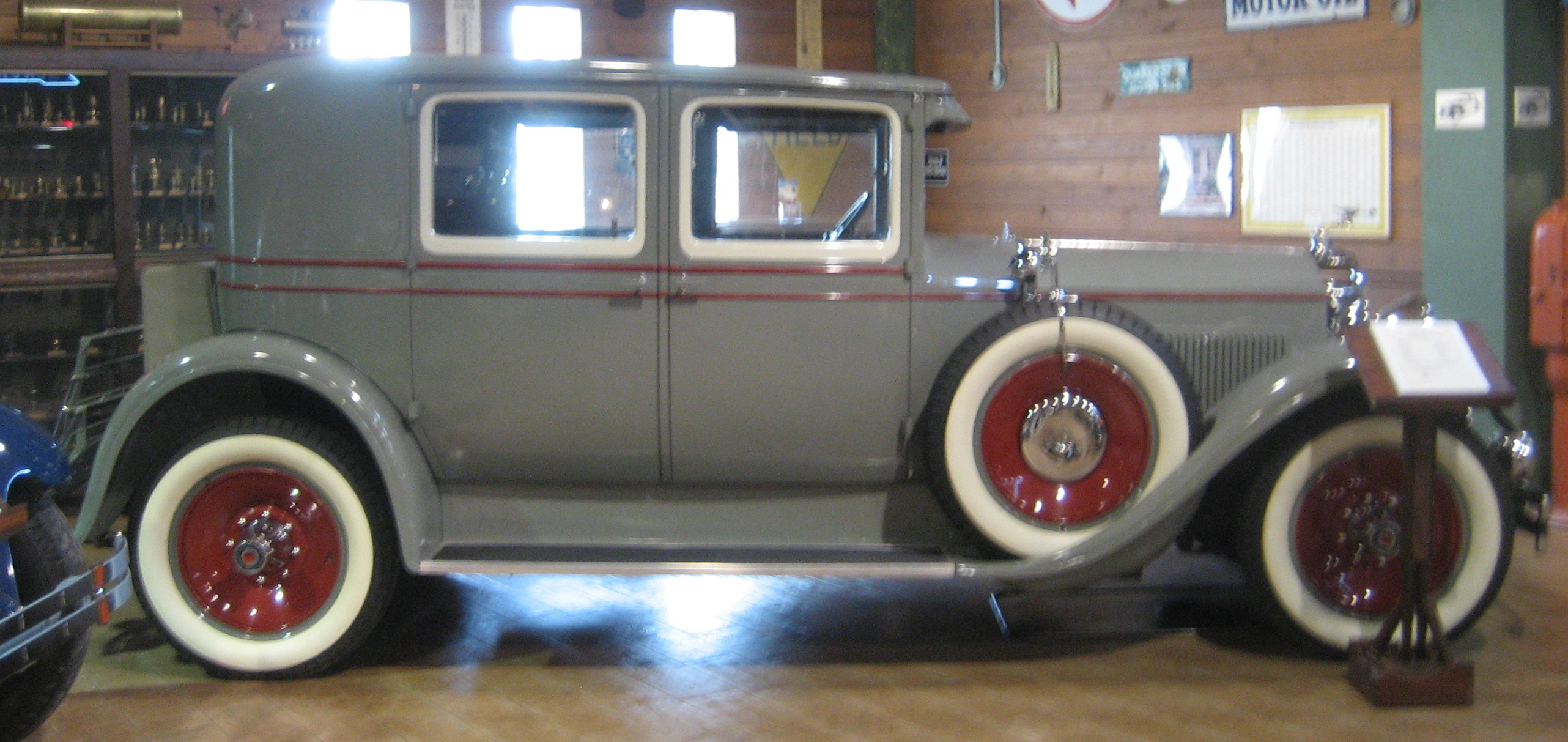
1929 Packard Close Coupled Sedan

A close-coupled sedan is a body style produced in the United States during the 1920s and 1930s. Their two-box, squarish styling made these designs more like crossover vehicles than traditional three-box sedans. Like other close-coupled body styles, the rear seats are farther forward than a regular sedan. This reduced the length of the body; close-coupled sedans, also known as town sedans, were the shortest of the sedan models offered.

Models of close-coupled sedans include the Chrysler Imperial, Duesenberg Model A, and Packard 745

=== Coach sedans ===
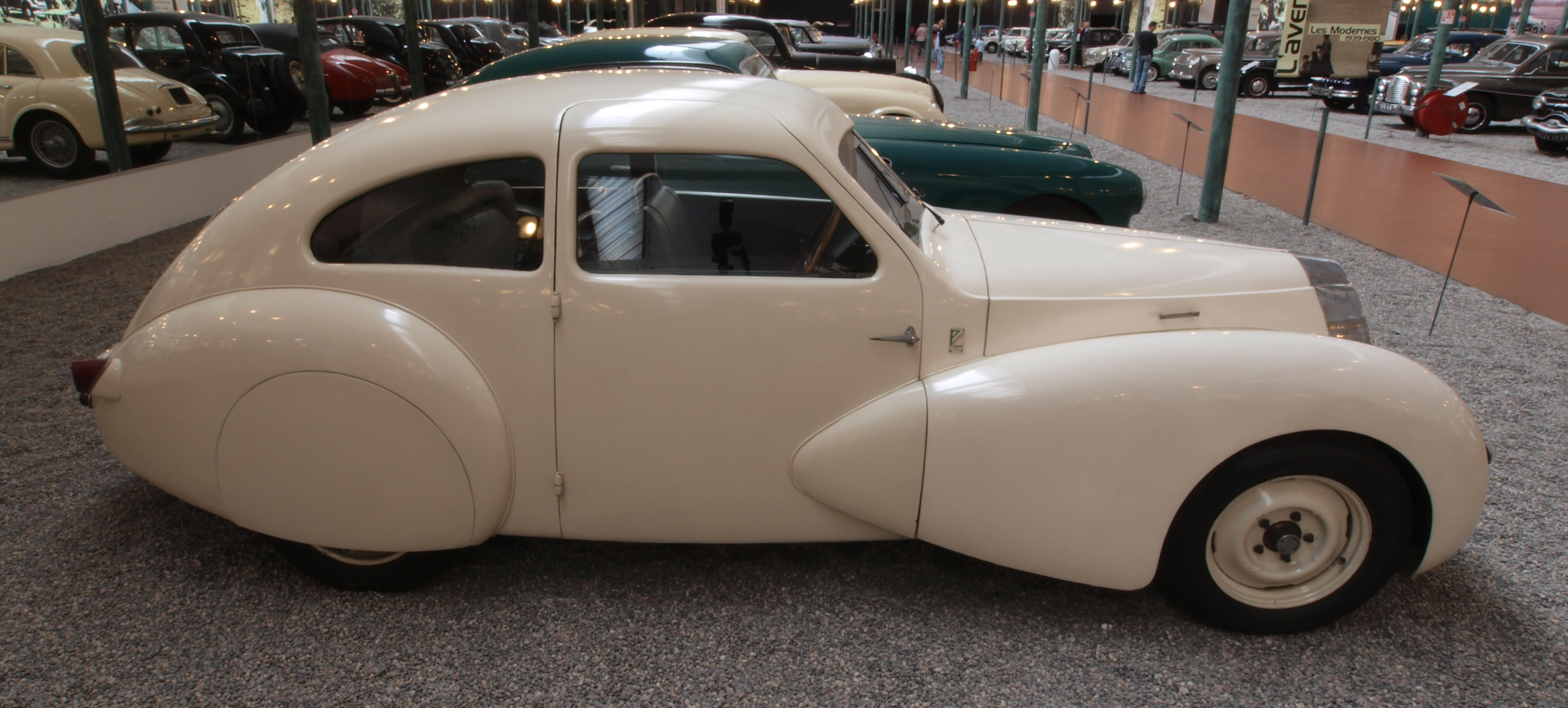
1947 Bugatti Coach

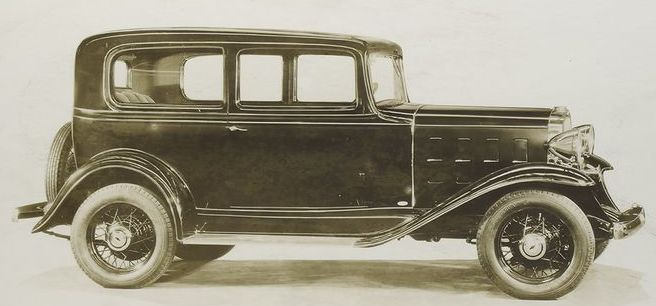
1932 Chevrolet Coach

A two-door sedan for four or five passengers but with less room for passengers than a standard sedan. A coach body has no external trunk for luggage. Haajanen says it can be difficult to tell the difference between a club and a brougham and a coach body, as if manufacturers were more concerned with marketing their product than adhering to strict body style definitions.

=== Close-coupled saloons ===
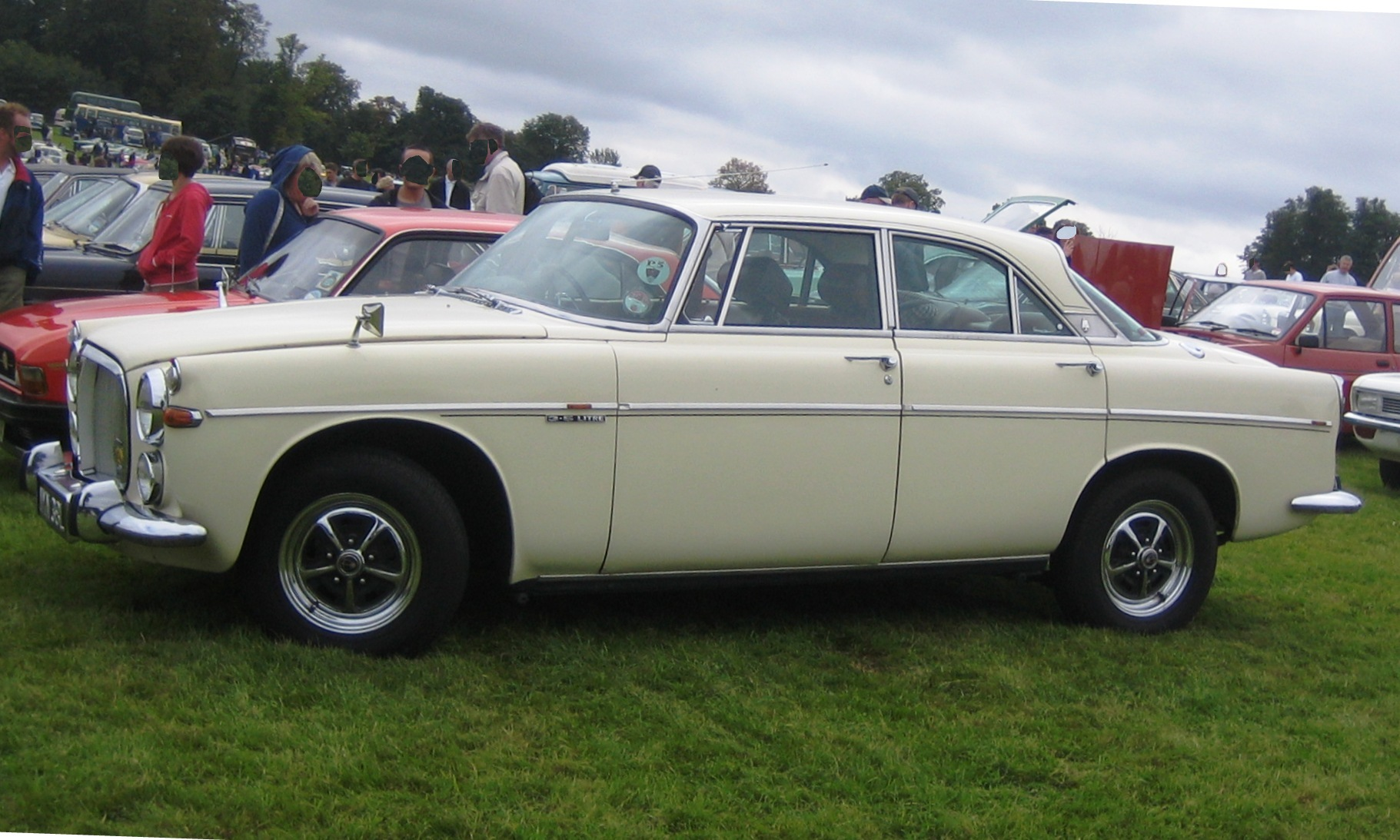
1967 Rover 3-litre coupé

Close-coupled saloons originated as four-door thoroughbred sporting horse-drawn carriages with little room for rear passengers' feet. In automotive use, manufacturers in the United Kingdom used the term to develop the chummy body, where passengers were forced to be friendly because they were tightly packed. They provided weather protection for extra passengers in what would otherwise be a two-seater car. Two-door versions would be described in the United States and France as coach bodies. A postwar example is the Rover 3 Litre Coupé.

=== Club sedans ===
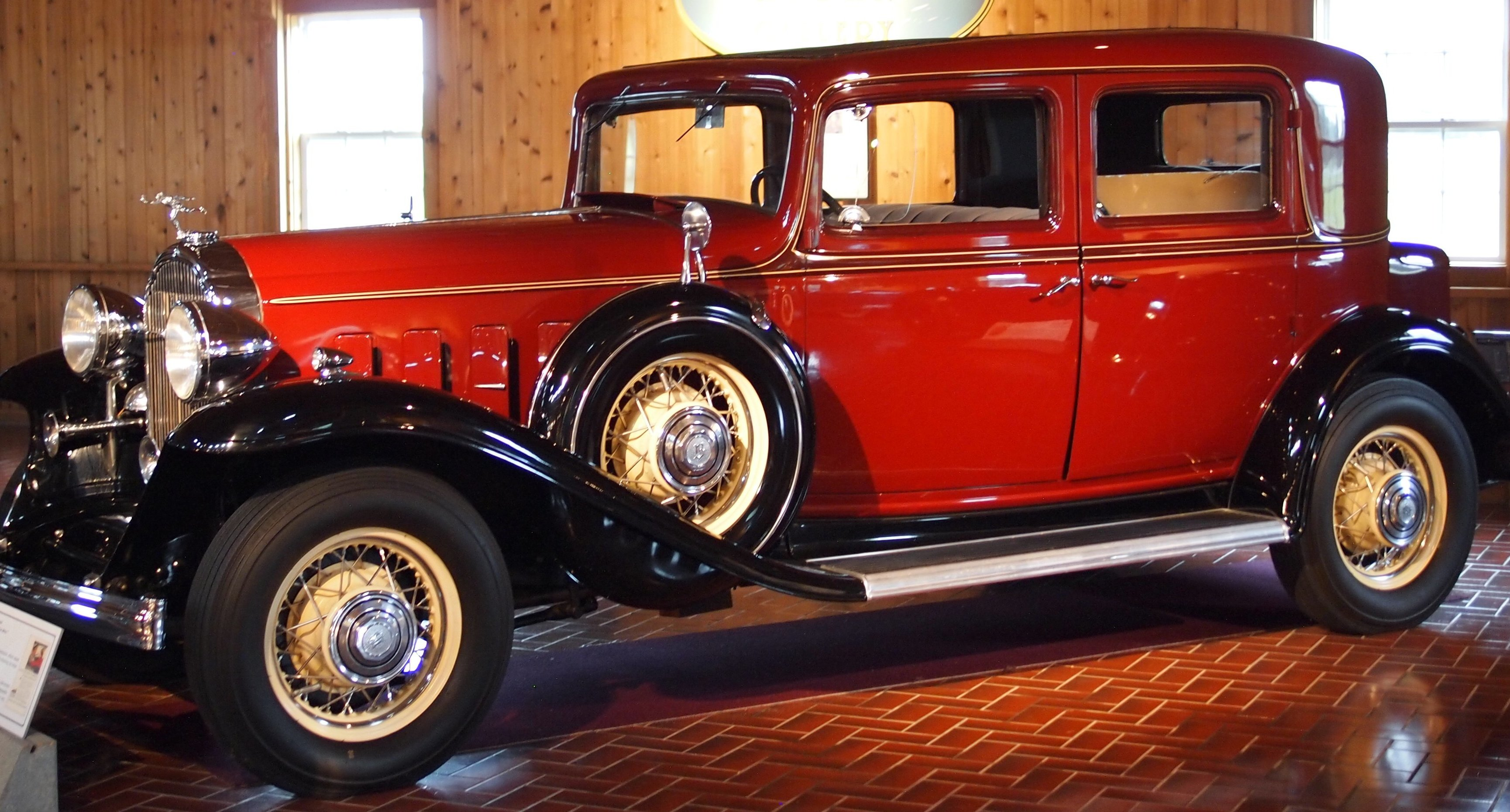
1932 Buick series 90 Club Sedan

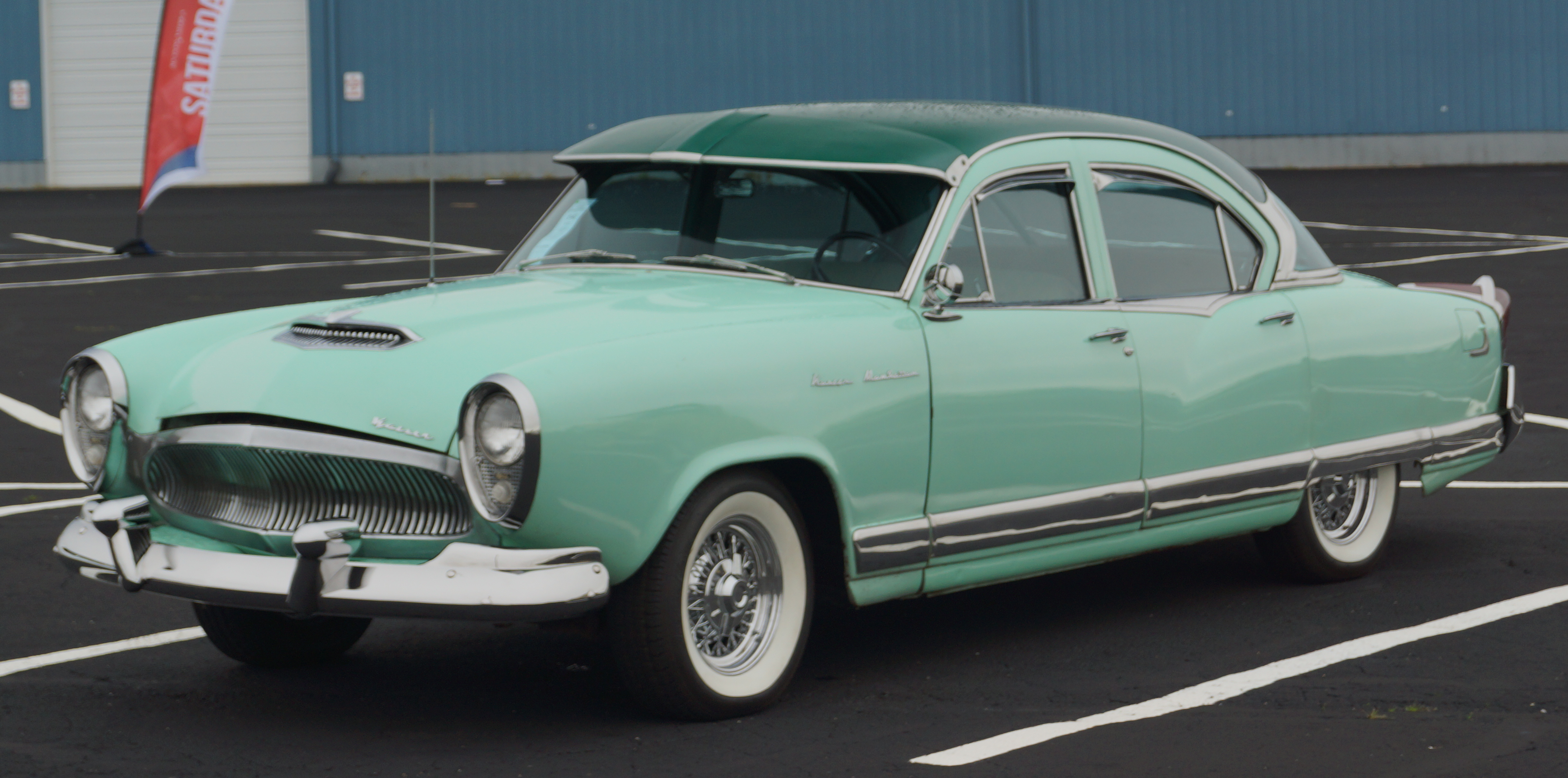
1954 Kaiser Manhattan Club Sedan

Produced in the United States from the mid-1920s to the mid-1950s, the name club sedan was used for highly appointed models using the sedan chassis. Some people describe a club sedan as a two-door vehicle with a body style otherwise identical to the sedan models in the range. Others describe a club sedan as having either two or four doors and a shorter roof and therefore less interior space than the other sedan models in the range.

Club sedan originates from a railroad train's club carriage (e.g.,, the lounge or parlour carriage).

=== Sedanets ===
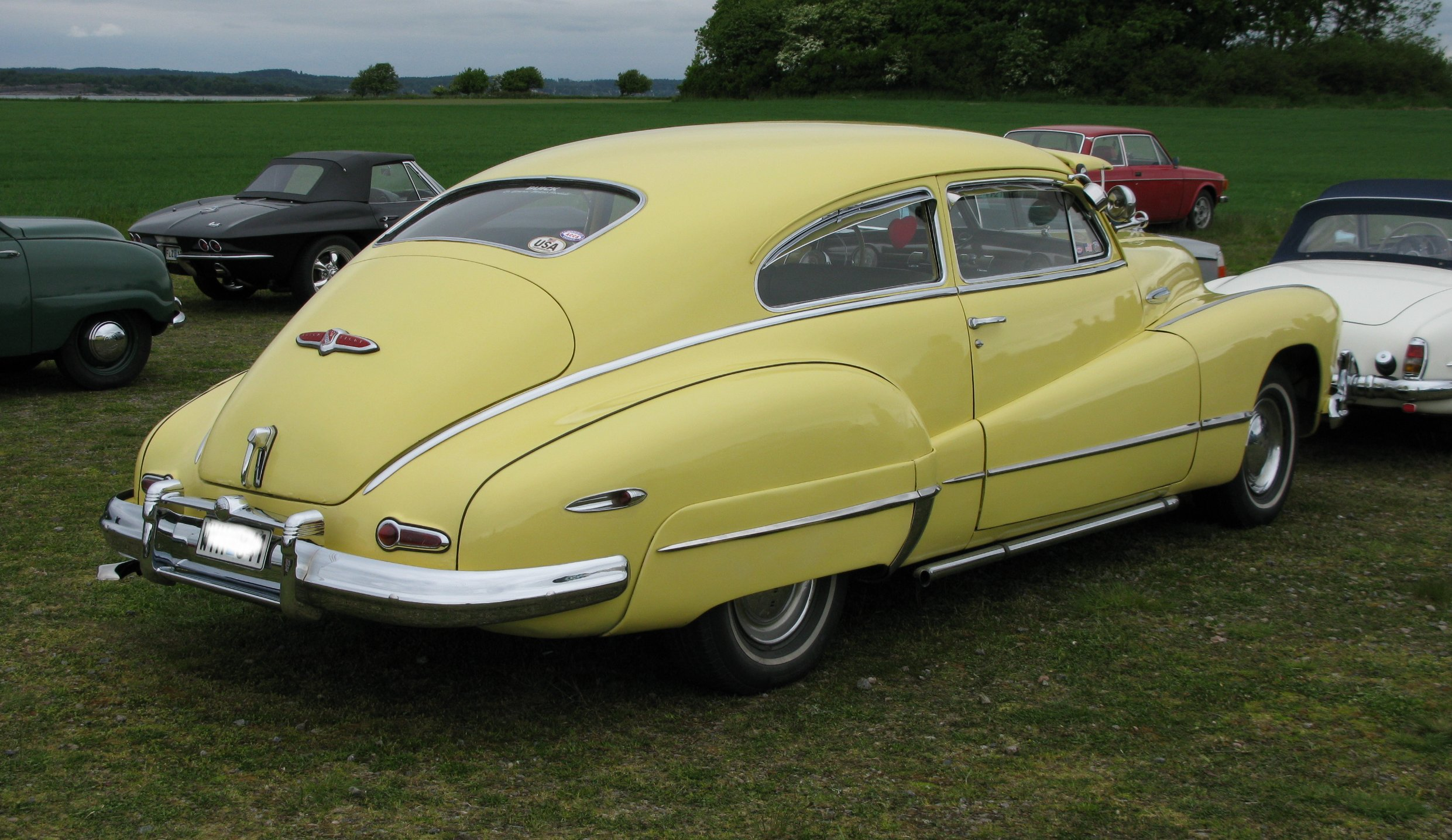
1947 Buick Sedanet

From the 1910s to the 1950s, several United States manufacturers have named models either Sedanet or Sedanette. The term originated as a smaller version of the sedan; however, it has also been used for convertibles and fastback coupes. Models that have been called Sedanet or Sedanette include the 1917 Dort Sedanet, King, 1919 Lexington, 1930s Cadillac Fleetwood Sedanette, 1949 Cadillac Series 62 Sedanette, 1942-1951 Buick Super Sedanet, and 1956 Studebaker.

== See also ==
- Car classification
