= Renault AX =

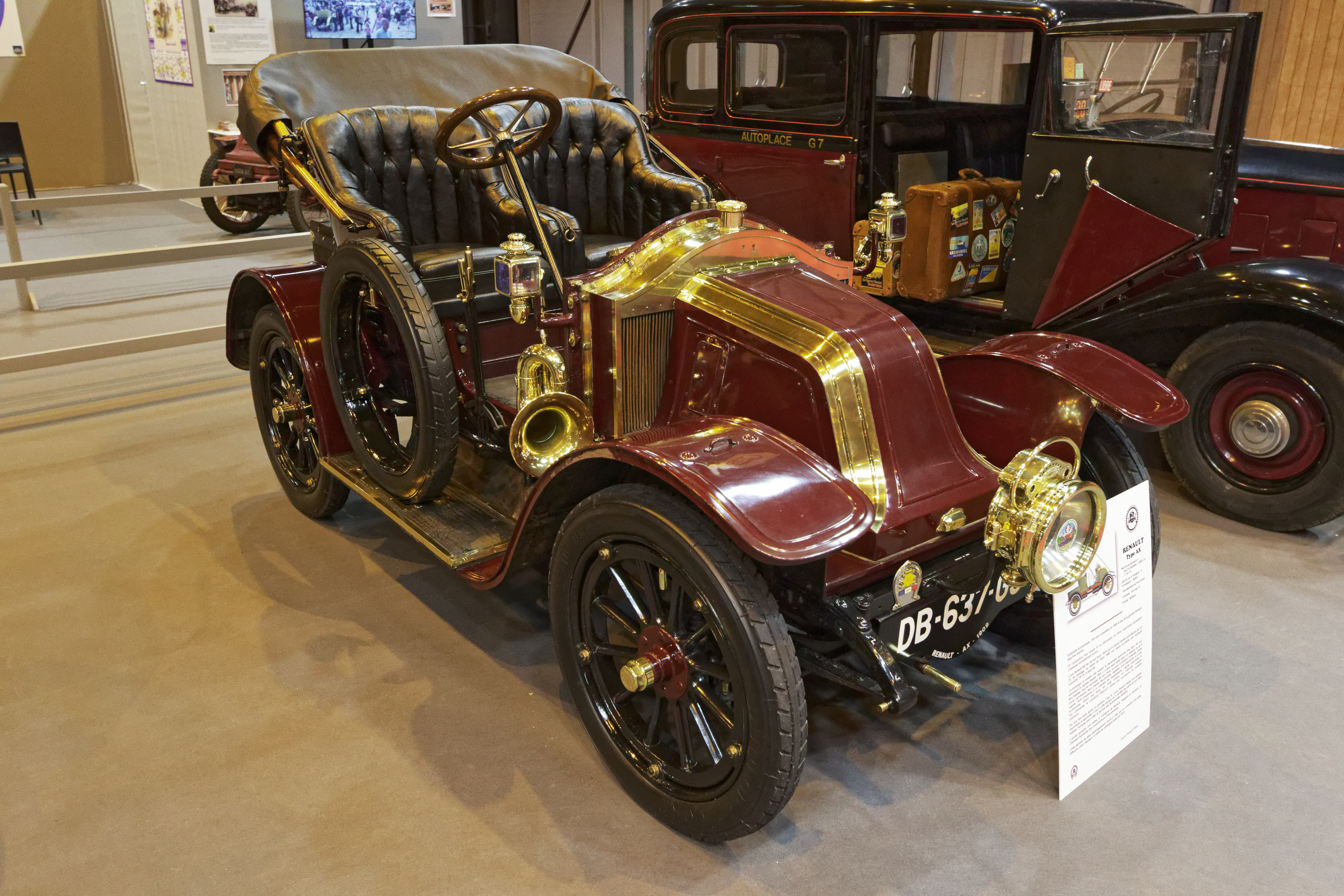

Overview
- Manufacturer: Renault
- Production: 1908–1914
- Designer: Louis Renault

Powertrain
- Engine: 12hp, 1,205cc two-cylinder engine

Dimensions
- Curb weight: 750 kg

Chronology
- Predecessor: Renault Type Y
- Successor: Renault Taxi de la Marne

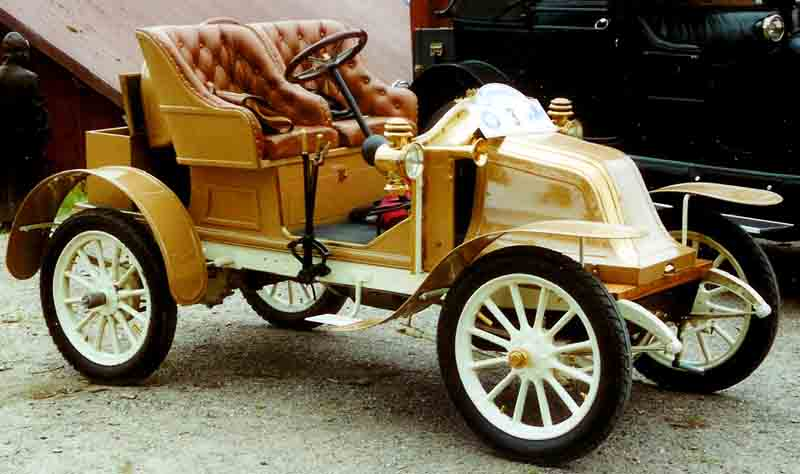
Renault AX 3-Seater 1909

The Renault AX is an automobile manufactured by Renault from 1908 to 1914. It was mostly used by cab drivers.

The AX had a 2-cylinders straight engine with a displacement of 1,060 cc and a power of 8 kW. Its maximum speed was 35 mph (56 km/h). The vehicle weighed 750 kg.
