= Renault Type Y =

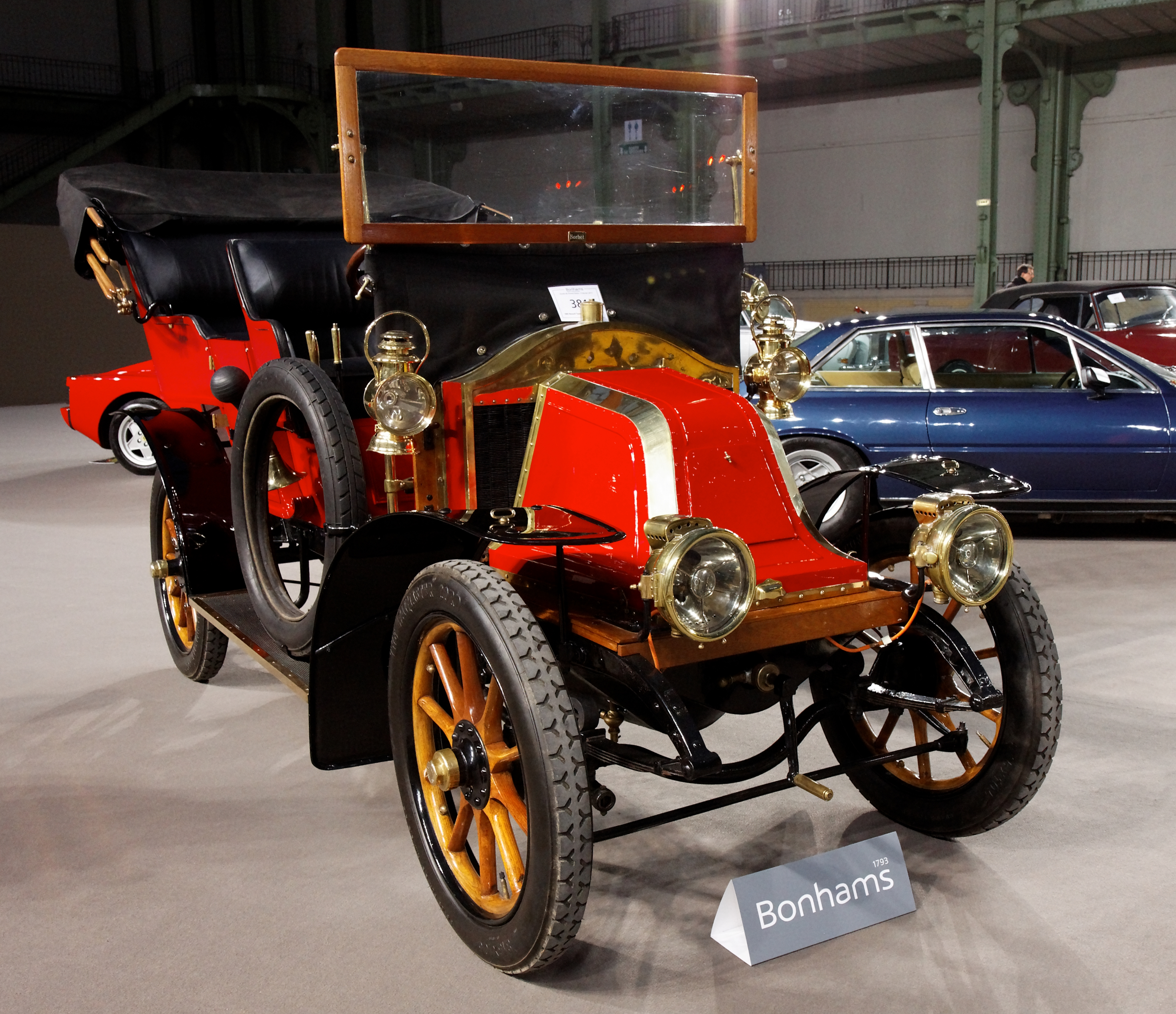

Overview
- Manufacturer: Renault
- Production: 1905–1906
- Designer: Louis Renault

Body and chassis
- Class: Medium family car
- Body style: 4-seat car

Powertrain
- Engine: FR I2
- Transmission: Manual, 3-gear

Dimensions
- Length: 3,400 mm (130 in)
- Width: 1,550 mm (61 in)

Chronology
- Predecessor: Renault Voiturette
- Successor: Renault AX

The Renault Type Y was a French automobile produced between 1905 and 1906 by Renault.

It is believed that the mechanical structure and design came out as an evolution to that of the Renault Voiturette as it is very similar to the Type C, D and E Voiturettes.
