= Renault NN =

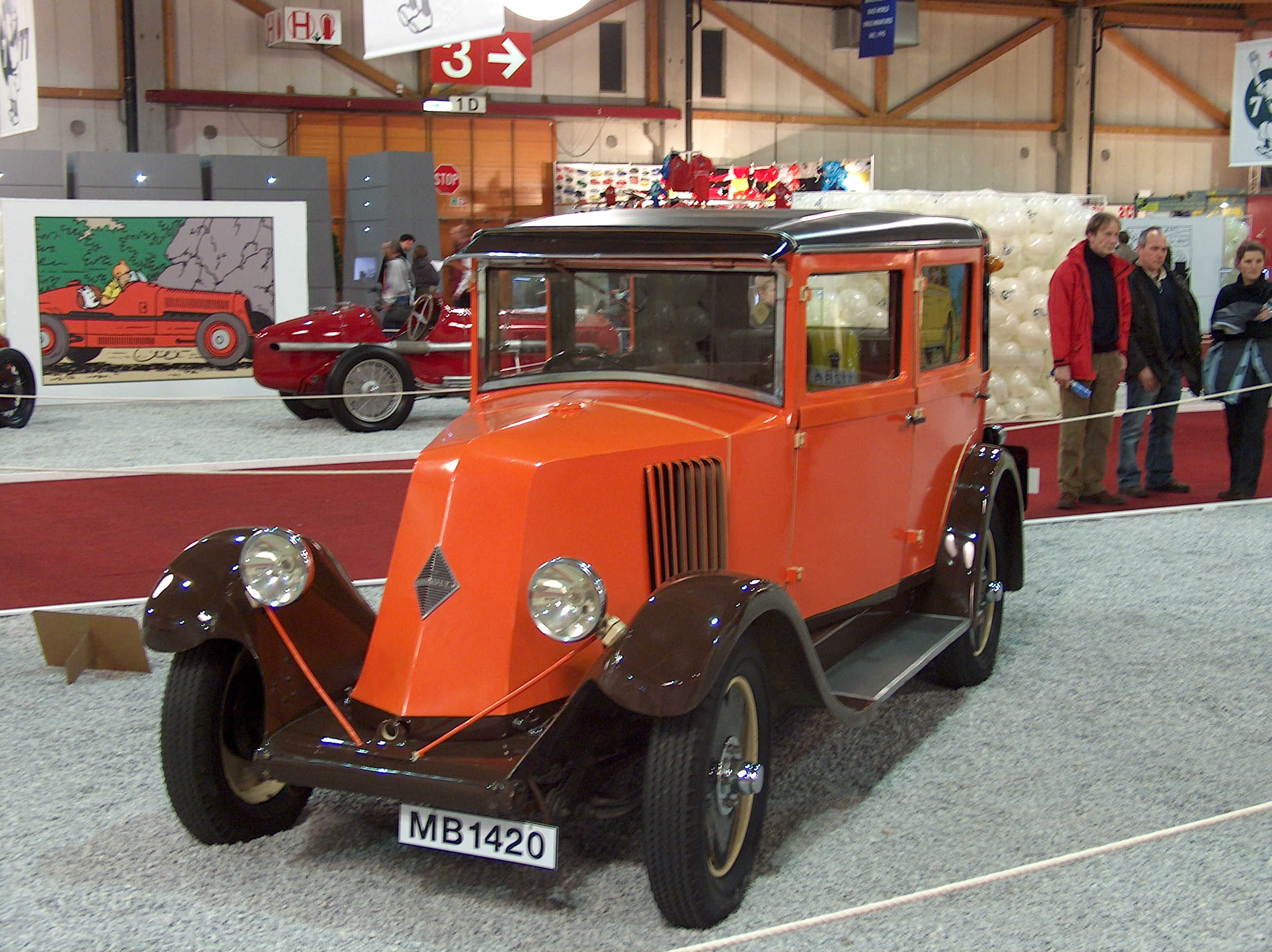
- Renault NN1 Berline

Overview
- Manufacturer: Renault
- Also called: Renault 6 CV
- Production: 1924–1929
- Assembly: France: Île Seguin, Boulogne-Billancourt, Paris
- Designer: Louis Renault

Body and chassis
- Class: Compact car / Small family car (C)
- Body style: 4-door saloon 2/4-door torpedo 2-door coupé
- Layout: FR layout

Powertrain
- Engine: 951 cc I4, 6CV, 17 hp (13 kW), 15 hp (11 kW)
- Transmission: 3-speed manual

Dimensions
- Wheelbase: 2,650 mm (104.3 in)
- Length: 3,550 mm (139.8 in) - NN; 3,700 mm (145.7 in) - NN1/NN2
- Width: 1,370 mm (53.9 in)
- Height: 1,720 mm (67.7 in)
- Curb weight: 1,150 kg (2,540 lb)-1,550 kg (3,420 lb)

Chronology
- Predecessor: Renault KJ; Renault MT
- Successor: Renault Monasix

The Renault NN, generally known to contemporaries simply as the Renault 6 CV, is a compact car or small family car manufactured by Renault from 1924 until 1929.

== Details and evolutions ==
Powered by a four-cylinder 951 cc engine, the NN was first presented at the 1924 Mondial de l'Automobile in Paris as the successor for Renault KJ and MT. It was in effect a lengthened version of the MT, with an extra 200 mm (7.9 in) of wheelbase, and the addition of front-wheel brakes.

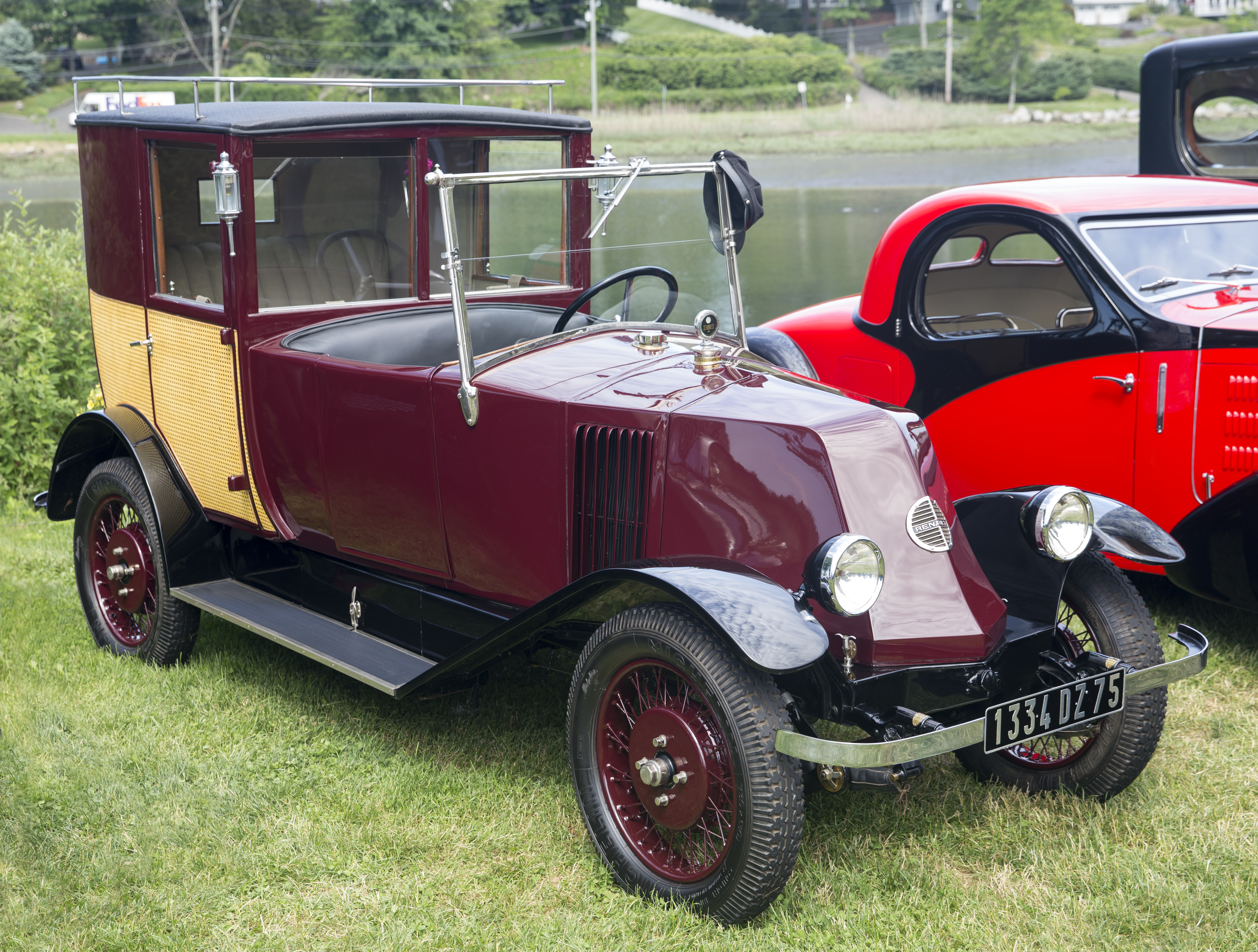
A Renault NN Town Car with coachwork by Jean Henri-Labourdette, built to ferry child movie stars to premieres for Metro Pictures.

The exterior design was very simple and family-oriented. Renault at this stage still positioned the radiator behind the engine, which meant that there was no grille at the front, but there were prominent "gills" on the sides of the bonnet/hood for cooling purposes. During 1925, Renault replaced the earlier round logo from 1923 with the first of the long running losange (rhomboid) designs. In January 1926 the bonnet became taller, while in March new more rounded front fenders replaced the earlier flatter units on the Normale and Luxe versions - the base model retained the original fender design. A Torpedo commercial model was also added to the lineup during 1926.

In 1927 the NN1 appeared, with more rounded fenders and now with bumpers installed. The wheelbase remained unchanged but the overall length increased somewhat. In 1928 the heavier NN2 was introduced, this also has bodywork extended between the front leaf springs and is of a generally more substantial appearance. The NN2 also received a single-plate clutch and an integrated rear differential; it remained in production until 1930.

The car could reach between 42 and 70 km/h (26 and 43 mph) depending on the gearing. In total, around 150,000 cars were sold. The NN2 was introduced in 1929, a larger and heavier car.

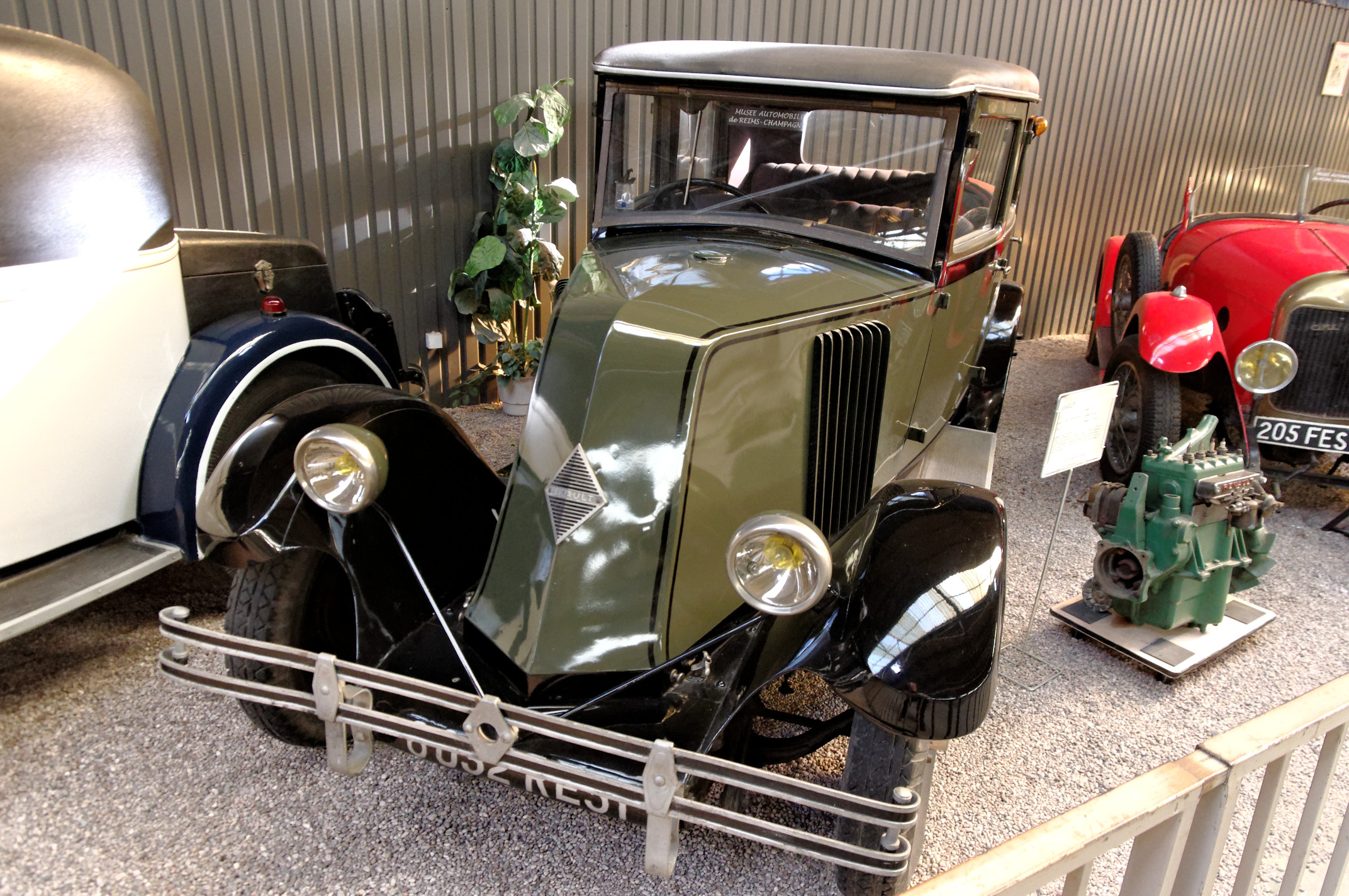
Renault NN2

The car was replaced by the Renault Monasix, though this was a larger car and was powered by a (small) 6-cylinder engine. It was only in 1937 that the manufacturer launched a replacement model in the 6 CV class, the Juvaquatre.

== Types ==
- NN: Produced from 1924–1927
- NN1: Produced from 1927–1928
- NN2: Produced from 1928–1930
