= Renault MT =

Car manufactured by Renault

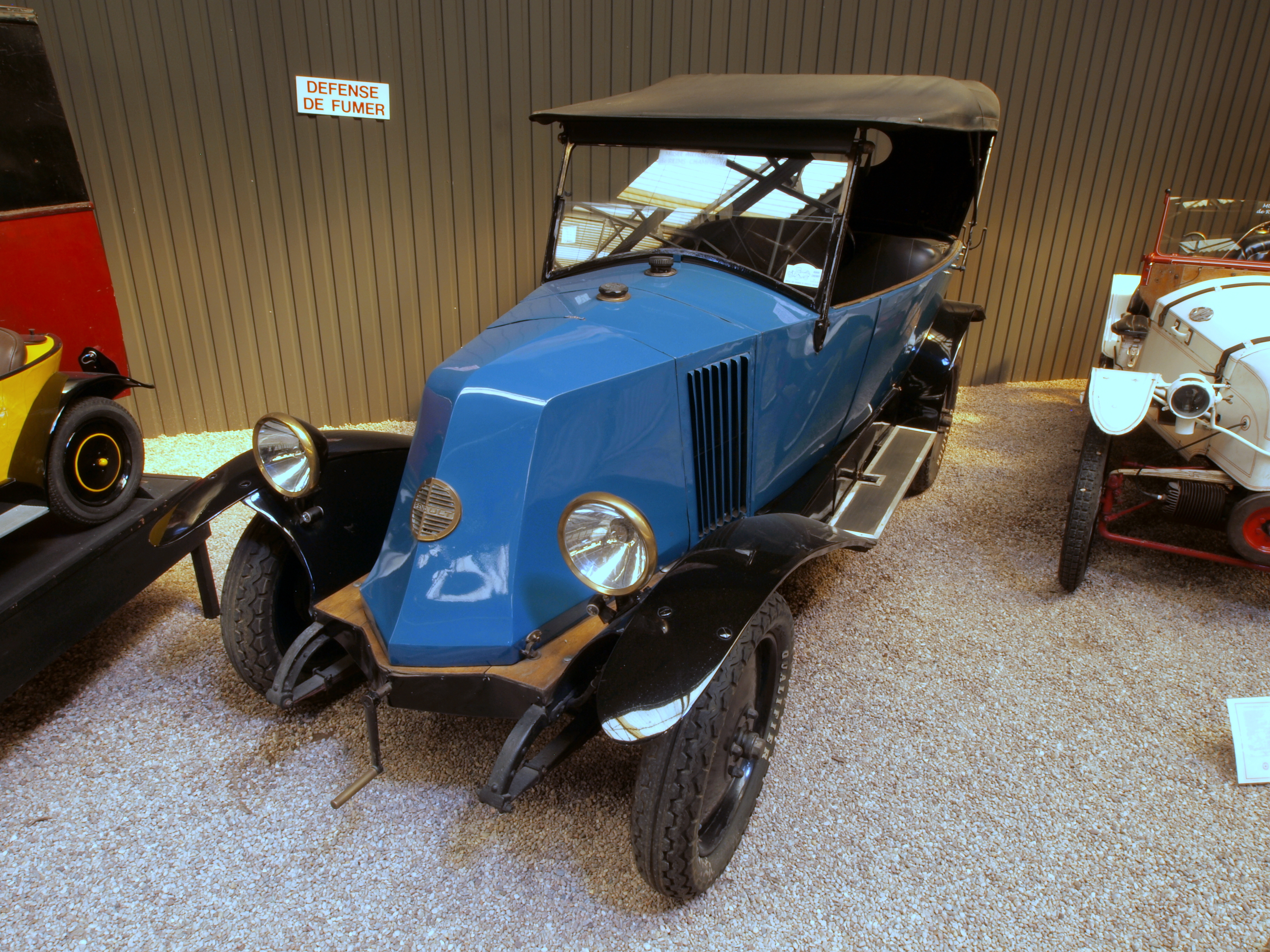

Overview
- Manufacturer: Renault
- Also called: Renault Type MT
- Production: 1923–1925
- Assembly: France: Île Seguin, Boulogne-Billancourt, Paris
- Designer: Louis Renault

Body and chassis
- Class: Sport compact (S)
- Body style: 2-door torpedo
- Layout: FR layout
- Related: Renault KJ

Powertrain
- Engine: 951 cc I4, 6CV, 15HP
- Transmission: 3-speed manual

Dimensions
- Length: 3,650 mm (143.7 in)
- Width: 1,370 mm (53.9 in)
- Curb weight: 543 kg (1,197 lb)

Chronology
- Predecessor: Renault KJ
- Successor: Renault NN

The Renault MT is a compact sports car manufactured by Renault from 1923 until 1925.

== Description ==
The Renault MT was presented in the 1923 Mondial de l'Automobile in Paris. The national licensing authority granted its approval on February 19, 1924. The model replaced the Renault KJ. The project was created and designed by Labourdette and Louis Renault together with the Renault KJ, as a middle-class car with an alternative style for 3 passengers. It was produced in skiff or boat tail body styles.

The car had a water-cooled four-cylinder engine. The engine power was transmitted to the rear axle via a Cardan shaft. The top speed was given as 45 km/h to 60 km/h, depending on the gear ratio.

The vehicle was priced between 15,000 and 17,500 francs depending on the body type. The vehicle did not sell well due to its high cost at the time. The comparable Citroën Type C only costed 12,800 francs.

The Renault MT's front was very similar to the Renault KJ. Production ceased in 1924 as Renault replaced this model with the Renault NN, which sold around 150,000 cars in total.

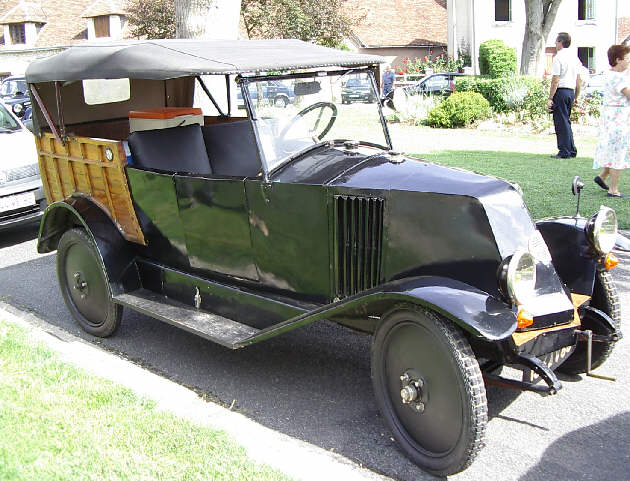
1925 Renault MT Truck modified after market

== Characteristics ==
- Speed: 60 km/h (37 mph)
- Power: 15HP (6CV)
