= Renault Monasix =

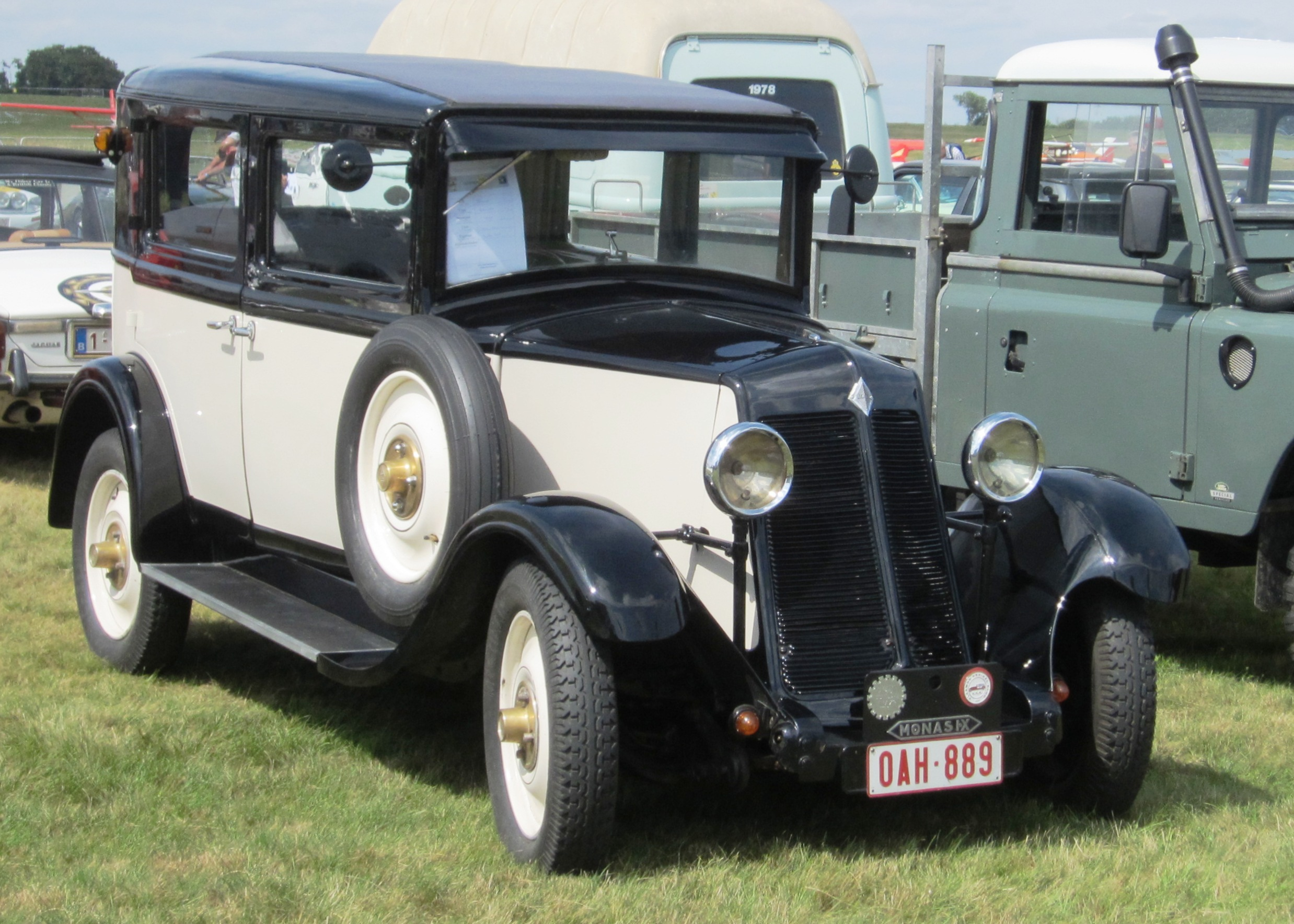
- c. 1930 Renault Monasix RY2

Overview
- Manufacturer: Renault
- Also called: Renault Monasix Monastella; Renault Monastella
- Production: 1927–1932
- Assembly: France: Île Seguin, Boulogne-Billancourt, Paris
- Designer: Louis Renault

Body and chassis
- Class: Compact car / small family car (C)
- Body style: 2-door coupé; 2-door convertible; 2-door truck; 4-door sedan; 4-door convertible; 4-door torpedo
- Layout: Front-engine, rear-wheel-drive
- Related: Renault Monastella

Powertrain
- Engine: 1476 cc sidevalve I6
- Transmission: 3-speed manual

Dimensions
- Wheelbase: 2,650 mm (104.3 in)
- Length: 3,700 mm (145.7 in)
- Width: 1,550 mm (61.0 in)
- Height: 1,600 mm (63.0 in)
- Curb weight: 1,350 kg (2,976 lb)

Chronology
- Predecessor: Renault NN
- Successor: Renault Monaquatre

The Renault Monasix (Type RY) was a compact car or small family car manufactured between 1927 and 1932 by Renault.

== Overview ==
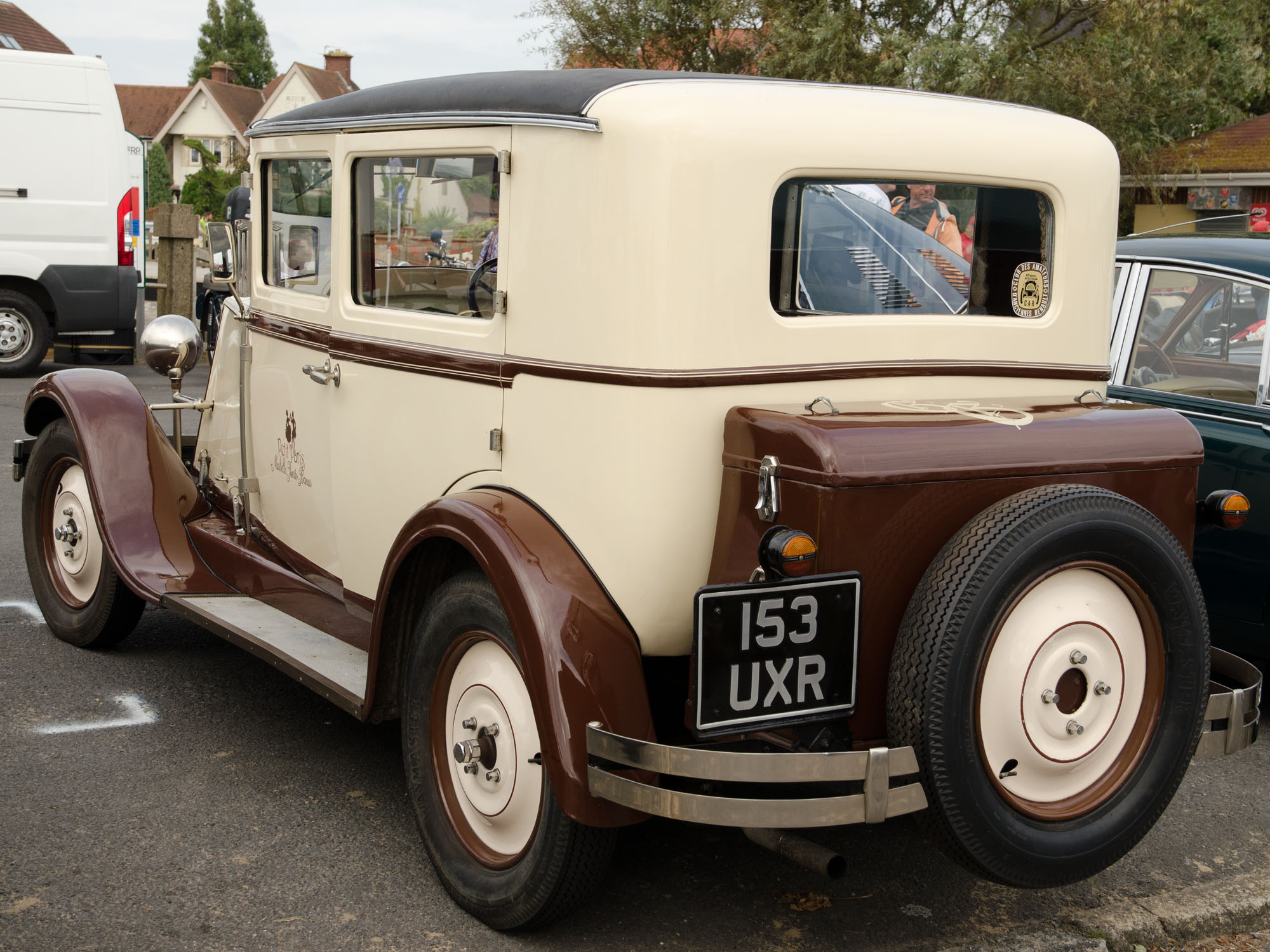
1931 Renault Monasix Type RY2

The car was considered a commercial failure mainly because the engine was too small for the car's length and weight, which often led to problems in keeping the car under control. Renault ended production of the car in 1932. With its 1,476 cc displacement the engine, of an 8CV tax horsepower rating, was one of the smallest six cylinder engines available at the time.

Starting in 1928, the "Compagnie Générale des voitures à Paris", the main Paris taxi company, purchased a large number of the cars and painted them in the same shade of green as that used for the city's buses: 5,000 taxi versions were made, the last of which were used in Paris until 1962.

In competition, the Monasix was raced in the Morocco Rally in 1928.

The Monastella version was an upgraded version of Monasix with better trim.

Production ended in 1932 and the car was replaced by the Renault Monaquatre.

== Types ==
- RY : Produced from 1927 to 1928 with the radiator behind the engine (no front grille: side gills on hood) storage below doors
- RY1: Produced from 1928 to 1929 with the radiator behind the engine (no front grille: side gills on hood) no storage below doors
- RY2: Produced from 1929 to 1931 radiator in front of the engine, front grille, no side gills on bonnet
- RY3: Produced from 1931 to 1932 radiator in front of the engine, front grille, side gills on bonnet

== Characteristics ==
- Top speed: 91 km/h (57 mph)
- Power: 12.5 hp (9.2 kW) (8CV)
