= Renault Monastella =

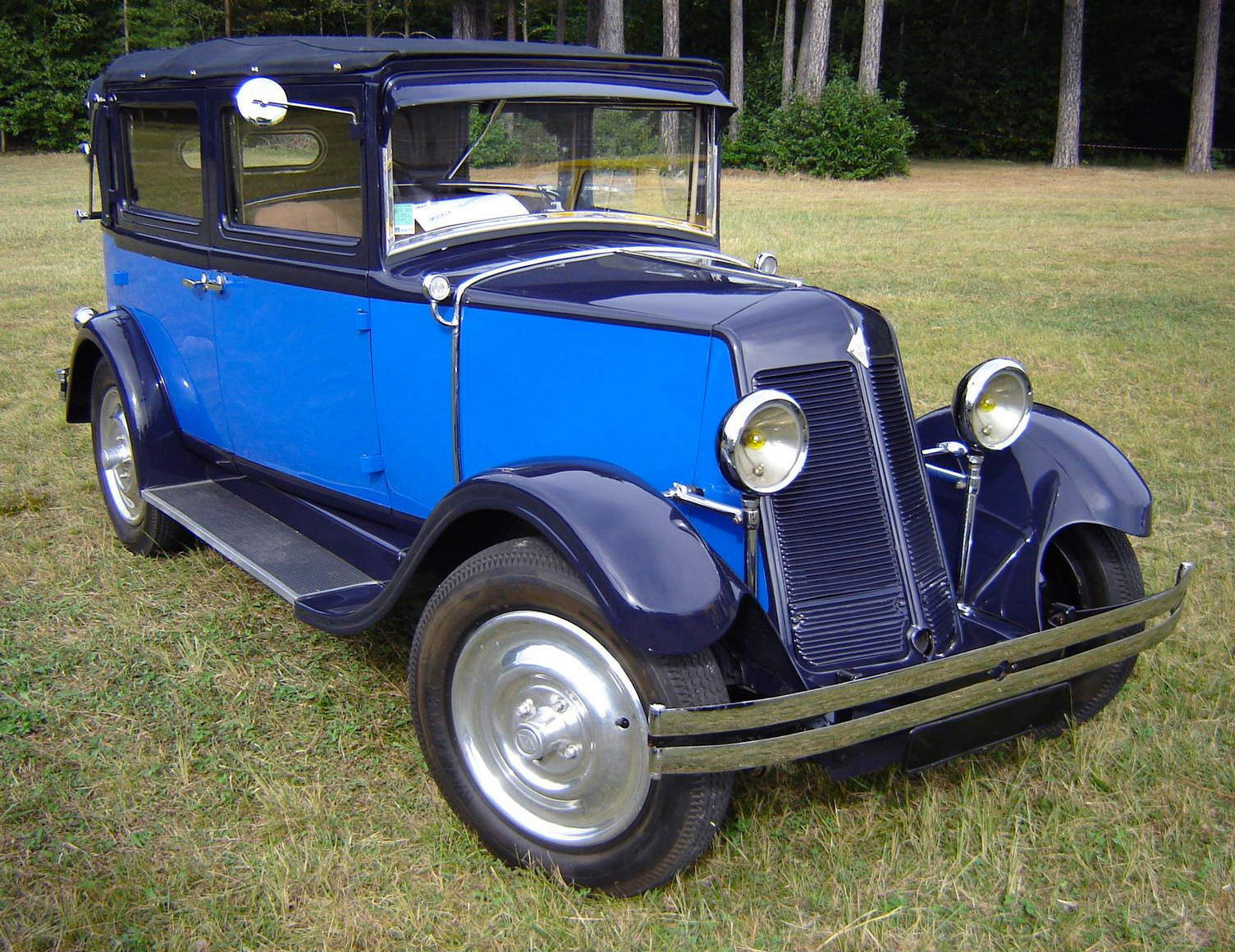
- Renault Monastella RY3

Overview
- Manufacturer: Renault
- Also called: Renault Monasix Monastella
- Production: 1928–1932
- Assembly: France: Île Seguin, Boulogne-Billancourt, Paris
- Designer: Louis Renault

Body and chassis
- Class: compact luxury car executive car
- Body style: 4-door Sedan; 4-door Torpedo; 2-door Convertible; 2-door Coupe
- Layout: FR layout
- Related: Renault Vivasix; Renault Monasix

Powertrain
- Engine: straight-6, 1476 cc, 8CV, 26HP straight-6, 1476 cc, 8CV, 33HP
- Transmission: 3-speed manual

Dimensions
- Wheelbase: 2650 mm
- Length: 3700 mm
- Width: 1550 mm
- Height: 1600 mm
- Curb weight: 1350 kg

Chronology
- Predecessor: none
- Successor: Renault Primastella

The Renault Monastella (Type RY1) was a compact luxury car manufactured between late 1928 and 1933 by Renault. It shared the mechanical elements and bodywork options of the Renault Monasix but was differentiated by superior levels of finish and equipment.

== Details and evolutions ==
The Monastella was a more luxurious version of the Monasix which had itself first appeared at the 1927 Paris Motor Show. The 8CV Monastella was released for 1929 at the October 1928 motor show with a small 6-cylinder engine of 1476 cc. Apart from the superior equipment levels, it was differentiated from the Monasix by a plate that said "carrosserie STELLA": at a time when names for cars rarely went beyond defining their engine size and type, this badge stressed the manufacturer's determination to differentiate the two models.

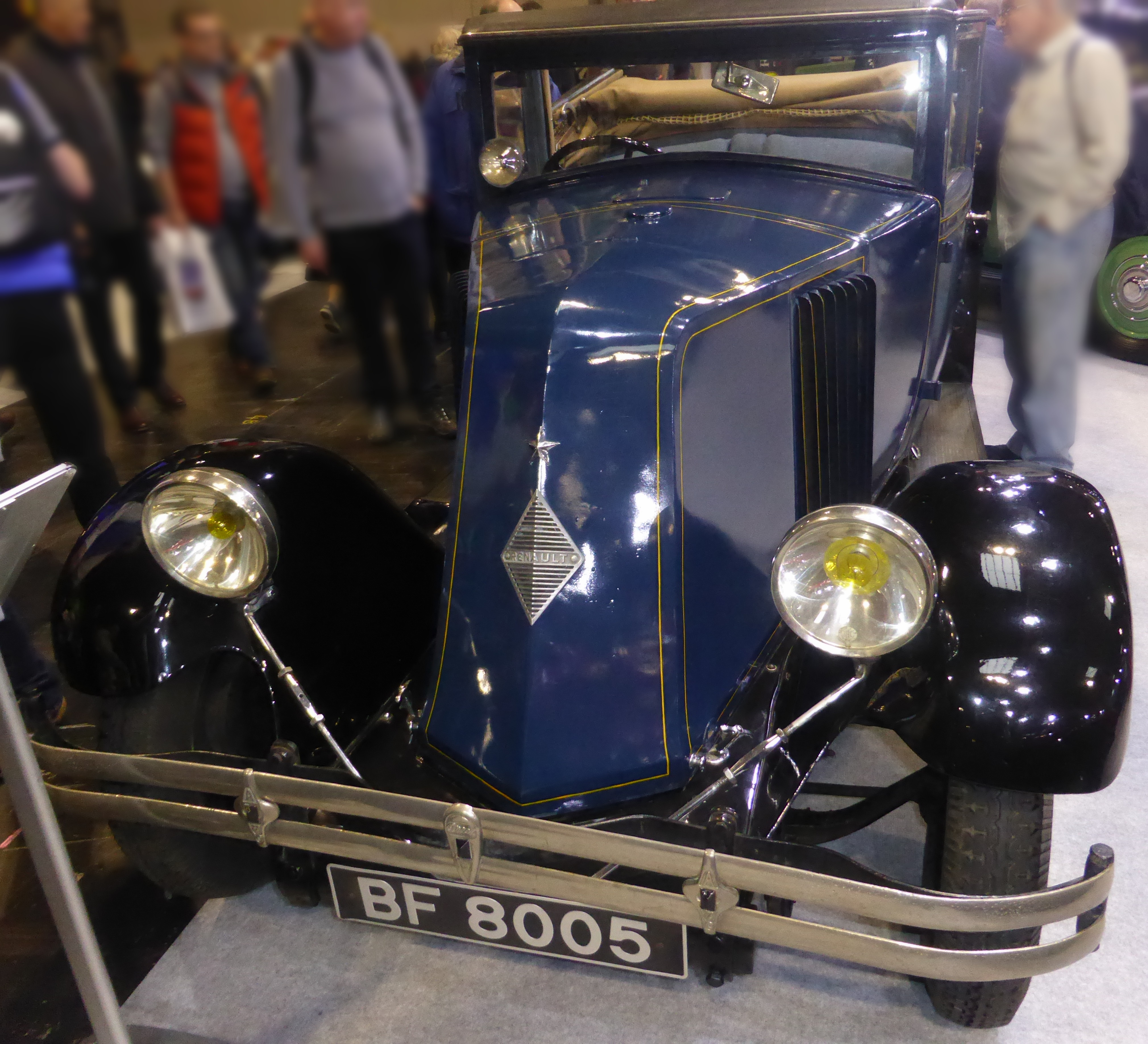
1927 Monastella (RY1), no grille

Initially the radiator was positioned behind the engine, reflecting the normal layout for Renault engine compartments during most of the 1920s. However, starting with the massive new Reinastella at the end of 1928, Renault moved the radiator to a more conventional position ahead of the engine, and by time of the next motor show, in October 1929, all Renaults including the Monastella's, lost the old "wind-cutter" grille-free front panel, in favour of a conventional front grille, reflecting the positioning of the radiator to a more "normal" position, just ahead of the engine block. (This also meant an end to the prominent "gills" just ahead of the doors on the sides of the hood/bonnet that had formerly directed air onto the radiator.)

In 1931 the new engine is more powerful with 33HP and new grille.

In 1933 ceased the production and the car was replaced by the Renault Primastella.

== Types ==
- RY1: Produced in 1929 (radiator behind engine).
- RY2: Produced between 1929 and 1931
- RY3: Produced between 1931 and 1932
- RY4: Produced between 1932 and 1933

== Characteristics ==
- Speed: 90 km/h
- Power: 26HP (8 CV) initially, 33HP (8CV) later versions
- Brakes: Cable controlled drum brakes on all four wheels
- Battery: 6 V
