= Renault KJ =

1923 automobile

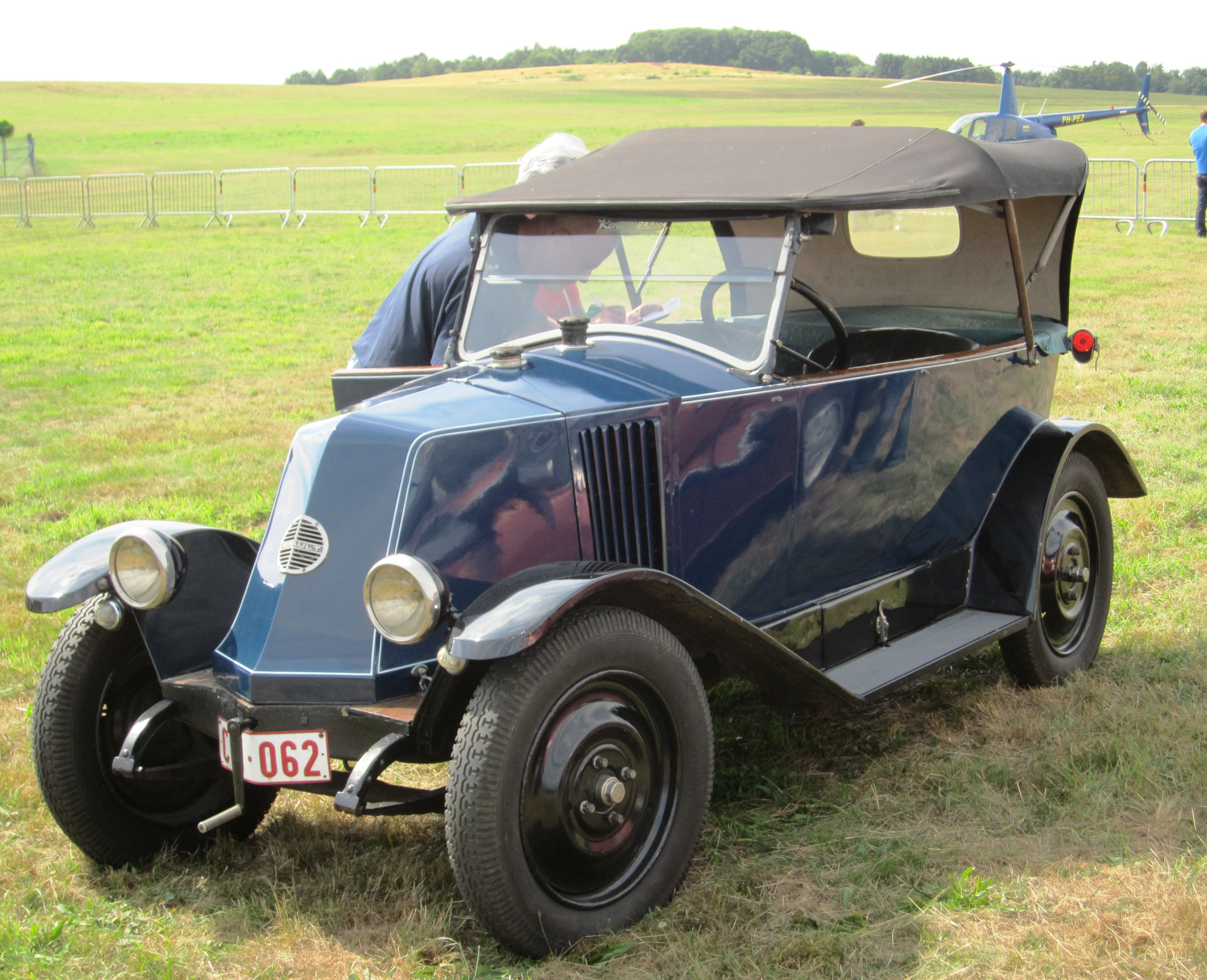

Overview
- Manufacturer: Renault
- Also called: Renault KJ
- Production: 1923–1924
- Assembly: France: Île Seguin, Boulogne-Billancourt, Paris
- Designer: Louis Renault

Body and chassis
- Class: Compact car / Small family car (C)
- Body style: Variety
- Layout: FR
- Related: Renault MT

Powertrain
- Engine: 951 cc I4, 6CV, 8.3HP
- Transmission: 3-speed manual

Dimensions
- Wheelbase: 2450 mm
- Length: 3350 mm
- Width: 1370 mm
- Height: 1720 mm

Chronology
- Predecessor: Renault FD
- Successor: Renault MT

The Renault KJ was a compact car or small family car manufactured by Renault from 1923 to 1924.

== History ==
The national licensing authority granted its approval on 7 July 1922. The Renault KJ was presented at the Mondial de l'Automobile in Paris in 1923, the project was created and designed by Louis Renault. A middle-class car, its competitors were the Peugeot Quadrilette and the Citroen Type C, the Renault KJ was available in a variety of body styles. Production of the KJ variant ended in 1923. As part of a model update, the KJ1 was introduced, which received its approval on 28 November 1922, and was available until 1924. In 1924, Renault ceased production of this model and replaced it with the similar Renault MT.

== Types ==
=== KJ ===
The KJ version had a narrow engine hood. The radiator, placed behind the engine, was wider and taller. The turning radius was specified as 10 m (33 ft). The chassis weighed 440 kg (970 lb). Documented body styles include a roadster and a limousine. In October 1922, the roadster variant costed 11,800 francs. At least one Renault KJ was a convertible.

=== KJ1 ===
The KJ1 had an engine hood that was as wide and as tall as the radiator. The turning circle was now specified as 11 m (36 ft). The chassis weighed 450 kg (990 lb). From March 1924, brakes on the front wheels were available for an additional cost of 1,500 francs. In addition to the versions listed in the following table, there were also pickup and van models.

The following prices (in francs) are known:

Variant	Price in 1922	Price in October 1923
Roadster with a jumpseat	11,800	13,100
Torpedo with 3 seats	12,000	13,300
Luxury torpedo	-	13,800
Tous Temps, two-seater roadster	-	15,400
Limousine with 3 seats	13,500	14,900

== Specifications ==
The Renault KJ had a power of 6CV or 15HP. The water-cooled four-cylinder engine has a 58 mm bore and 90 mm stroke with a displacement of 951 cm³. The engine power was transmitted to the rear axle via a driveshaft. The vehicle had a three-speed gearbox. The top speed was listed as between 45 km/h (28 mph) and 60 km/h (37 mph), depending on the gear ratio.

The vehicle is 313.5 cm (10.29 ft) long and 131 cm (4.30 ft) wide with a wheelbase of 245 cm (8.04 ft) and a track width of 115 cm (3.77 ft). The height of the vehicle is 172 cm (5.64 ft). The complete vehicle weighed 860 kg (1,900 lb).
