= Here I Am =

Here I Am may refer to:

== Music ==
=== Albums ===
- Here I Am (Alexander Klaws album) or the title song (see below), 2004
- Here I Am (Barbara McNair album), 1966
- Here I Am (Blue System album), 1997
- Here I Am (Dionne Warwick album) or the title song, 1965
- Here I Am (Gil album), 1998
- Here I Am (Joya album) or the title song, 1995
- Here I Am (Kelly Rowland album), 2011
- Here I Am (Marion Raven album) or the title song, 2005
- Here I Am (Marvin Sapp album) or the title song, 2010
- Lip Lock (working title Here I Am), by Eve, 2013
- Here I Am, by Groundation, 2009
- Here I Am, by Johnny Tillotson, 1967
- Here I Am, by Jorge Santana, 2009
- Here I Am, by Sharon Bryant, or the title song, 1989
- Here I Am: Bacharach Meets Isley, by Burt Bacharach and Ronald Isley, 2003

=== EPs ===
- Here I Am (EP), by Yesung, or the title song (see below), 2016
- Here I Am, by VAST, 2017

=== Songs ===
- "Here I Am" (Air Supply song), 1981
- "Here I Am" (Alcazar song), 2004
- "Here I Am" (Alexander Klaws song), 2004
- "Here I Am" (Asking Alexandria song), 2016
- "Here I Am" (Bryan Adams song), 2002
- "Here I Am" (Dolly Parton song), 1971
- "Here I Am" (The Explosion song), 2005
- "Here I Am" (Jenny Berggren song), 2010
- "Here I Am" (Monica song), 2010
- "Here I Am" (Natalie Gauci song), 2007
- "Here I Am" (Patty Loveless song), 1994
- "Here I Am" (Rick Ross song), 2008
- "Here I Am" (Yesung song), 2016
- "Here I Am (Come and Take Me)", by Al Green, 1973; covered by UB40, 1990
- "Here I Am", by Big Tom and The Mainliners from The Sweetest Gift, 1995
- "Here I Am", by Bryan Rice from Good News, 2007
- "Here I Am", by Delta Goodrem, the B-side of the single "I Don't Care", 2001
- "Here I Am", by Dominoe, 1988
- "Here I Am", by Downhere from Ending Is Beginning, 2008
- "Here I Am", by Dynasty from The Second Adventure, 1981
- "Here I Am", by Emmylou Harris from Stumble into Grace, 2003
- "Here I Am", by Erik Santos, 2008
- "Here I Am", by Globe, the opening theme for the anime Black Jack, 2005
- "Here I Am", by High and Mighty Color from Gō on Progressive, 2006
- "Here I Am", by Jeremy Camp from I Will Follow, 2015
- "Here I Am", by Leona Lewis from Spirit, 2007
- "Here I Am", by Lyle Lovett from Lyle Lovett and His Large Band, 1989
- "Here I Am", by Melanie C from Melanie C, 2020
- "Here I Am", by Melanie Safka from Stoneground Words, 1972
- "Here I Am", by Michael Nesmith from Nevada Fighter, 1971
- "Here I Am", by Michael W. Smith from Healing Rain, 2004
- "Here I Am", by Nicki Minaj from Pink Friday, 2010
- "Here I Am", by No Secrets from No Secrets, 2002
- "Here I Am", by Rebecca St. James from Rebecca St. James, 1994
- "Here I Am", by Renee Sandstrom from the Camp Rock film soundtrack, 2008
- "Here I Am", by the Seekers, 1988
- "Here I Am", by Sertab Erener from No Boundaries, 2004
- "Here I Am", by Stephanie Mills from Merciless, 1983
- "Here I Am", by Steve Earle from El Corazón, 1997
- "Here I Am", by Skid Row from Skid Row, 1989
- "Here I Am", by Taeyeon from Purpose, 2019
- "Here I Am", by Tom Odell from Wrong Crowd, 2016
- "Here I Am", the opening theme for the Disney Channel series The Suite Life of Zack & Cody
- "Here I Am", from the musical Dirty Rotten Scoundrels

== Other uses ==
- Here I Am (Mackennal), a 1923 bronze statue by Bertram Mackennal
- Here I Am, a 1962 short film by Bruce Baillie included in the Treasures from American Film Archives series
- Here I Am (2011 film), an Australian film
- Here I Am (novel), a 2016 novel by Jonathan Safran Foer
- Here I Am, a 2008 Nike advertising campaign produced by Wieden+Kennedy

== See also ==
- Here Am I (disambiguation)
- Hineini (Hebrew for Here I am), a documentary about a Jewish LGBT high schooler
- "Rock You Like a Hurricane", a song by Scorpions, whose lyrics contain "Here I am"
