= Renault Super 5 =

Car produced by Renault between 1984 and 1996

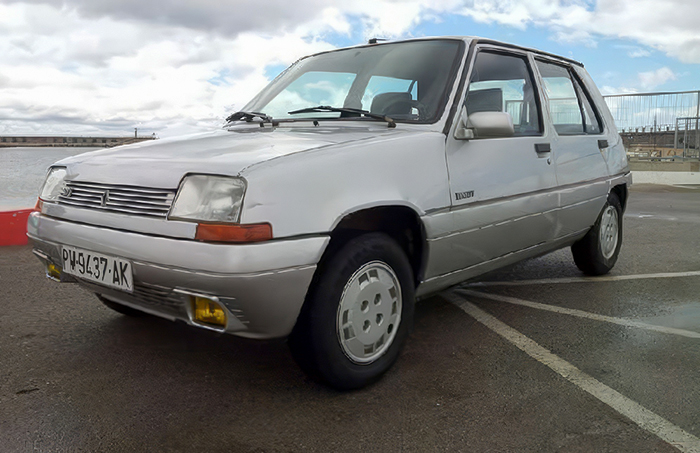

Overview
- Manufacturer: Renault
- Also called: Renault 5 Supercinq; Supercinque; Superfive
- Production: 1984–1996
- Assembly: France: Billancourt, Flins-sur-Seine, Dieppe; Belgium: Haren, Vilvoorde; Spain: Palencia; Portugal: Setúbal; Venezuela: Mariara; Slovenia: Novo Mesto
- Designer: Marcello Gandini

Body and chassis
- Class: Supermini (B)
- Body style: 3/5-door hatchback
- Layout: Front-engine, front-wheel-drive
- Related: Renault Express

Dimensions
- Wheelbase: 2,407 mm (94.8 in) (3-door); 2,467 mm (97.1 in) (5-door)
- Length: 3,590 mm (141.3 in) (3-door); 3,650 mm (143.7 in) (5-door)
- Width: 1,590 mm (62.6 in)
- Height: 1,390 mm (54.7 in)
- Curb weight: 760–860 kg (1,676–1,896 lb)

Chronology
- Predecessor: Renault 5
- Successor: Renault Clio

The Renault Super 5 (also known as the Renault 5, Supercinque or Supercinco) is a supermini (B-segment) car produced by the French manufacturer Renault between 1984 and 1996. Its design was inspired by the profile of the Renault 5, although it is slightly longer and lower, as it was conceived to replace it in the French brand's range. For this reason, it is also known as the Renault 5; in fact, this is the name that always appeared on the rear of the model.

The car has a length of 3,590 mm (141.3 in) (3,750 mm (147.6 in) with 5 doors), a width of 1,590 mm (62.6 in), a height of 1,390 mm (54.7 in) and a wheelbase of 2,407 mm (94.8 in) (2,467 mm (97.1 in) with 5 doors). The weight, depending on the version, ranges from 760 to 860 kg (1,676 to 1,896 lb).

Over twelve years, Renault produced more than three million units at its plants in Billancourt, Dieppe and Flins-sur-Seine (France); Brussels and Vilvoorde (Belgium); Palencia (Spain); Setúbal (Portugal); Mariara (Venezuela) and, from 1989, Novo Mesto (Slovenia). Approximately 500,000 vehicles were assembled annually, a figure that gradually decreased from 1990, so that by the time production ended in 1996, a total of 3,436,650 units had been manufactured. In terms of sales, 1988 was the best year, with 518,910 vehicles sold across Europe. There were twenty-two versions, as well as more than thirty-five limited editions. Its commercial rivals included models such as the Citroën AX, the Ford Fiesta, the Opel Corsa, the Peugeot 205, the SEAT Ibiza and the Volkswagen Polo, among others.

The development of the Renault Super 5 began in 1978 and was codenamed Project 140. The plan lasted for more than six years, as the proposals presented lacked the necessary consensus to be carried out. This situation remained unchanged until the designer Marcello Gandini, who authored many Italian sports cars of the 1960s and 1970s, joined the project. His proposal was simple: to adapt the R5 to the new needs of the automotive market. To do this, he applied the technique that luxury brands had been using for decades: creating a vehicle whose appearance reminded one of its predecessor, which already had public favour.

The Super 5 is based on the chassis of the Renault 9/11, so it has greater interior space than its predecessor. It is front-wheel drive and its petrol engine is in a transverse front-engine layout; the range includes from the 1.1-litre displacement, two valves per cylinder and 48 bhp maximum power of the C version to the 1.4-litre displacement, two valves per cylinder and 120 bhp maximum power of the GT Turbo versions. The top speed of the Super 5 was achieved by the GT Turbo2 model, with 204 km/h (127 mph) and acceleration from 0 to 100 km/h (62 mph) in 8 seconds.

Between 1986 and 1991, the 5 GT version participated in the World Rally Championship, until it was replaced by the Renault Clio Williams. Notable drivers who competed with it include Gustavo Trelles, Jean Ragnotti and Alain Oreille; the latter was twice champion of the World Rally Championship for Production Cars (1989 and 1990) at the wheel of a Super 5 GT Turbo, in addition to obtaining victory with it in the 1989 Rallye Côte d'Ivoire. It has also competed in continental, national and regional championships.

Over the years, for some it has become an icon of the 1980s. Numerous associations attest to this and many people still drive one of these French utility cars daily. However, various factors, such as the time that elapsed between its launch and the arrival of the Clio, the variety in the sector at the time as well as the similarity of its design to the R5, meant that it did not become as memorable a vehicle as its predecessor. Even so, it is present in multiple collections of scale model cars and has appeared in songs, in cinema, on television and in some video games.

== Design and development ==
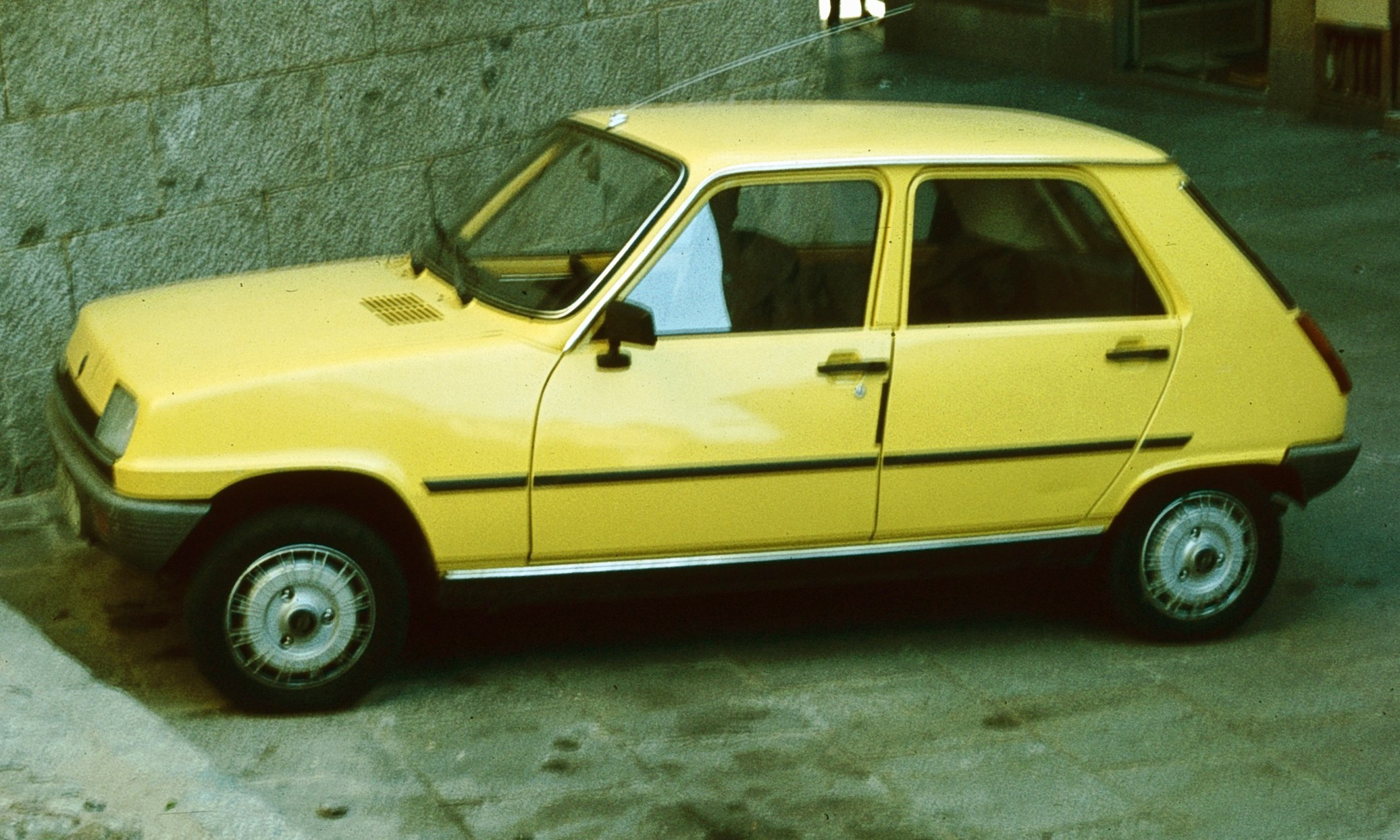
Project 140 sought a successor for the Renault 5

The design of the Super 5 began in 1978 with the intention of creating a vehicle to replace the Renault 5. At that time it was the best-selling car in France and enjoyed great popularity. The design and development process for the new vehicle was called Project 140. It was a slow process, lasting more than six years. The shape of the bodywork was designed based on the Renault 9/11, while preserving the main lines of the R5 so that the public would associate it with its predecessor. For the same reason, the characteristic plastic bumpers and side mouldings of the Renault 5 were retained, although some modifications were made to prevent them from damaging the paintwork.

Initially, the design team used various prototypes from Renault's smaller segments as a base for the project. Dozens of designs were presented, but none achieved good results when tested. Among these, mention can be made of the Renault Gabbiano; it was a prototype inspired by Italian car designs, hence the name. It was presented at the Geneva Motor Show in 1983, the same year Peugeot, Renault's main competitor in the French market, unveiled its 205. The Gabbiano had futuristic lines and was reminiscent of the Renault Fuego as well as the DMC DeLorean. It ultimately remained a simple prototype, but some of its elements would later be incorporated into the Super 5.

After several years of work on the design, this was the French firm's most expensive project ever, and none of the proposals pleased the testers. But everything changed when Bernard Hanon, head of Project 140, brought Marcello Gandini onto the design team. The Italian suggested a simple plan: adapt the original model to meet the new demands of the car market. To do this, he used the technique that luxury brands like Mercedes-Benz or Jaguar had been using for years, and which Volkswagen incorporated in the second generation of the Golf: creating a vehicle whose appearance reminded one of its predecessor, which already had public favour. The new design presented a model that was wider, lower and longer than the R5. The size of the windows increased slightly and the nose was lower, while the rear showed few differences from the previous model. All these improvements meant an increase in aerodynamics as well as interior space.

== Commercial life ==
=== Launch ===
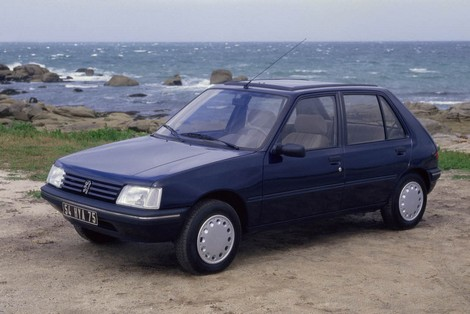
The Peugeot 205 was the main competitor of the Super 5, especially in the French market.

Following the success of Gandini's project, in September 1984 the Super 5 was ready to replace its predecessor in dealerships. The first official presentation took place on the 14th of that same month at the Élysée Palace. It was attended by the then French president, François Mitterrand (1981–1995), who also tested it. Ten days later a second showing for the press was held and in October it was shown to the public at the Paris Motor Show. Next to the vehicle was a large inflatable model of it as an advertising gimmick.

Advertising campaigns influenced the commercial results of the Super 5. The name itself, is a draw, alluding to the fact that it is an improved Renault 5. (Note: The first French slogans referred to the Superfive as a car "Plus cinq que la cinq.") In this sense, the term "Super 5" was an advertising concept, since "Renault 5" always appeared on the rear of the vehicle. In the first television commercials it was presented as "Supercar". There are two stages to these commercials; a first in which an animated Super 5 travels roads and shows its equipment, as was already done with the R5, and a second in which it is Superman's car. Among the commercials aired, notable ones include the 1984 ad, in which a personified R5 said goodbye to the public and was replaced by the Super 5, or the 1989 ad, famous for the rap song that accompanied it.

Subsequent vehicle sales figures reflected that the public accepted the successor to the R5 satisfactorily. During its first year on the market, it reached second place, only surpassed by the Peugeot 205, but from 1986 until 1990, the year the Peugeot 205 regained first place and the Renault Clio replaced the Super 5, it was the best-selling car in France. The year with the highest sales in that country was 1988 (241,849 units sold). In other countries it did not lead the sales charts, but remained among the top ten. It became the fourth best-selling car in Europe in 1988 (518,910 units), only surpassed by the Volkswagen Golf (739,445 units), the Fiat Uno (635,663 units) and the Opel Kadett (622,690 units). It is also noteworthy that, while in countries like Belgium, Slovenia, Spain, France, Italy or Portugal it sold quite well, with market shares ranging between three and eleven percent, in Germany, the Netherlands, the United Kingdom or Sweden it went more unnoticed, with shares below two percent. Coincidentally, the countries where the Super 5 had the highest sales rate, with the exception of Italy, have within their borders a Renault factory where this model was produced.

=== Production ===
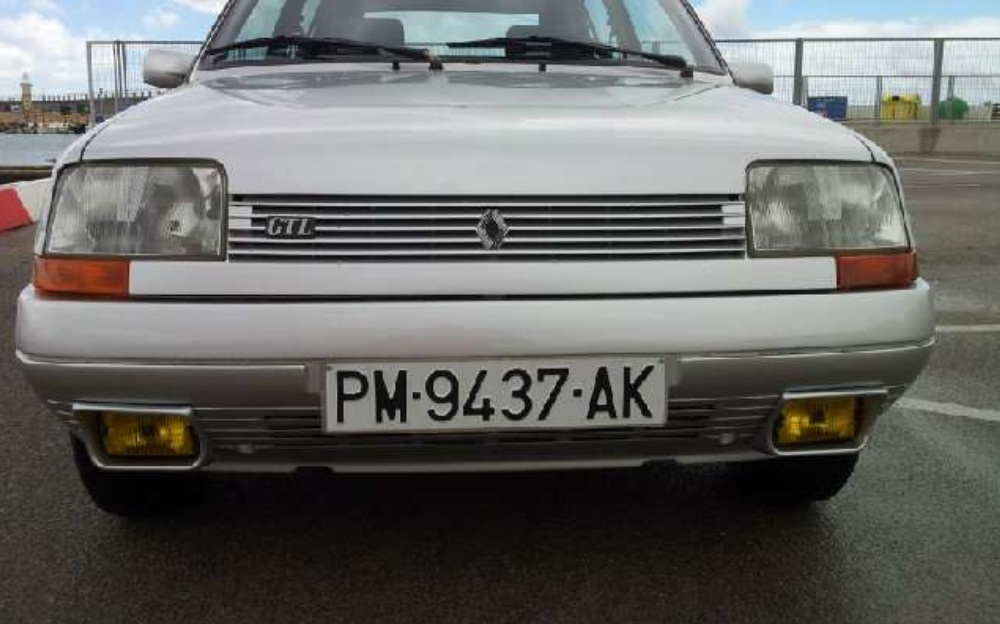
1986 Renault Superfive GTL.

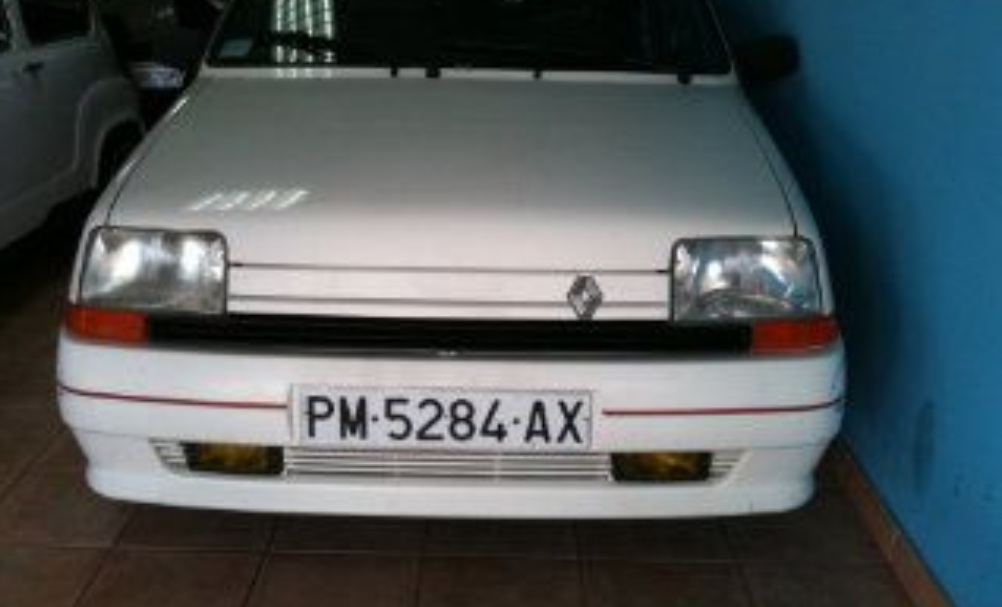
1989 Renault Superfive GTX. From 1988, the Renault logo becomes larger and moves from the centre of the grille to the right side.

In 1984, mass production of the Super 5 began, officially replacing the R5 from September. However, both generations coexisted for a season in dealerships; the Renault 5 continued to be marketed for a few more years as a limited series called Lauréate. In February 1985, an improvement was made to the first versions and production of the GT Turbo as well as the automatic transmission models began. That same year, five-door versions, six centimetres longer than the three-door models, and diesel engine versions became available. The Super 5 range for 1985 consisted of nine versions, (Note: The versions were C, TC, L, GL, TL, GTL, GTL 1.4, GTS and TSE) with prices for the French market ranging from 38,900 to 61,900 francs, which would be between 5,900 and 9,500 euros. (Note: The Consumer Price Index (CPI) of 1985 was much lower than in 2026, so today the cost would be 60% higher, i.e. approximately between 9,440 and 15,200 euros.)

Renault renewed the entire 5 range between 1986 and 1988. Production of the simplest versions and those that went on sale first also ended. During these years it was the best-selling car in France and one of the best-selling in Europe. It was also when most of the limited series were marketed and improvements were added to the most successful editions, such as automatic transmission in the specific version, luxury equipment in the Baccara or the redesign of the GT Turbo. In 1989 Alain Oreille obtained victory at the wheel of a Super 5 in the Rallye Côte d'Ivoire, the most outstanding milestone in the Super 5's track record.

In 1993, the last completely new units arrived at dealerships. From the following year, production of the Super 5 was considerably reduced in favour of the Clio, although it continued to be available alongside its successor until the end of the 1990s. Only one Renault factory continued to manufacture it, the Slovenian one in Novo Mesto, although most units were destined for export to countries with emerging economies such as the states of the former Yugoslavia or Morocco. Production of the Super 5 finally came to an end in 1996; in March a final limited series called Bye Bye went on sale and in July the last unit was assembled in Slovenia.

==== Factories ====
In total, eight Renault factories produced the 5:

- Haren-Vilvoorde, Belgium
- Novo Mesto, Slovenia
- Palencia, Spain
- Billancourt, France
- Dieppe, France
- Flins-sur-Seine, France
- Setúbal, Portugal
- Mariara, Venezuela

== Technical specifications ==
The 5 is a three or five-door hatchback with a monocoque unibody construction. It consists of two compartments, one occupied by the engine and the other intended for transporting passengers and luggage. The side doors have roll-down windows while the rear tailgate of the boot has a fixed window. The boot is much larger than that of the R5, with a capacity of 233 dm^{3} with the rear seats upright and 657 dm^{3} when folded flat. The vehicle has a length of 3,590 mm (141.3 in), a width of 1,590 mm (62.6 in), a height of 1,390 mm (54.7 in) and a wheelbase of 2,407 mm (94.8 in). The weight, depending on the version, ranges from 760 to 860 kg (1,676 to 1,896 lb).

=== Interior ===
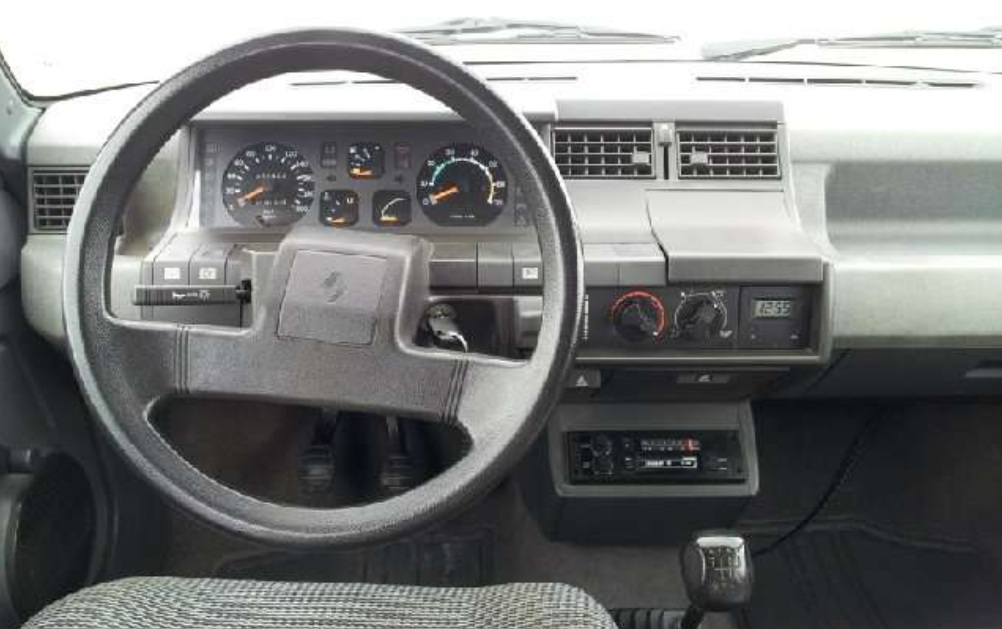
Dashboard of a Renault Super 5.

Although the car was designed as a compact vehicle, the interior was intended to be spacious: habitability is highly valued by users, so Renault significantly increased the interior capacity of the car compared to its predecessor. This was achieved by increasing the width of the seats at elbow level and by changing the engine layout from longitudinal to transverse. The boot was also made larger (233 dm^{3}), by moving the fuel tank and spare wheel under the vehicle. On the other hand, in the three-door versions, space is lost in the rear seats due to reduced mobility of the front seats. The interior also stands out for the comfort and convenience of its seats, compared to other similar models such as the Peugeot 205 or the Citroën AX.

Regarding sound systems, there were up to six different types of radio that could be fitted. All had cassette player and reception of stations on FM and AM. The firms that produced sound systems for Renault were Philips, Grundig, Pioneer and Blaupunkt. The controls and dashboard of the Super 5 are based on those of the Renault 11.

=== Exterior ===
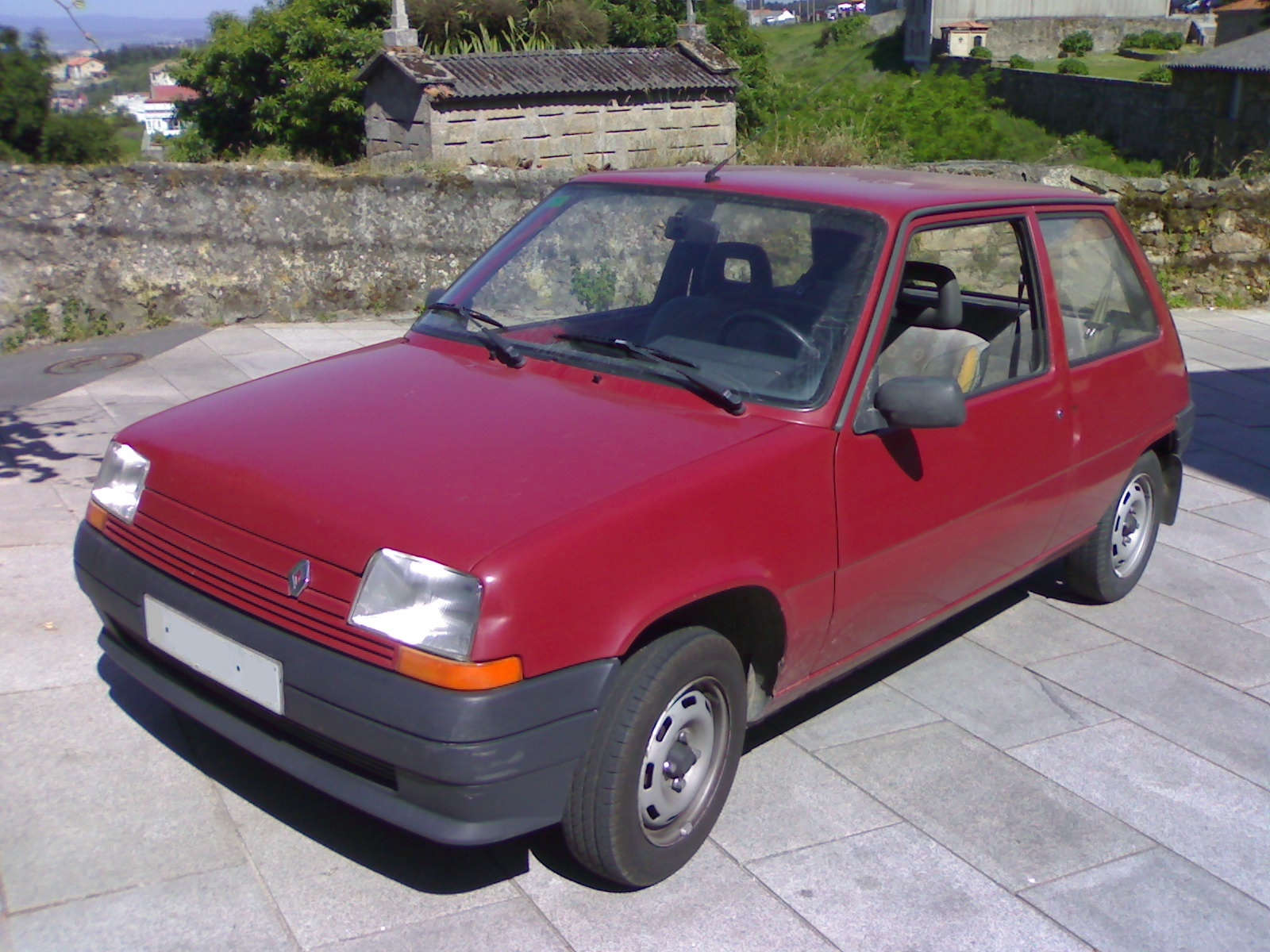
Front view of a Renault Super 5 Five.

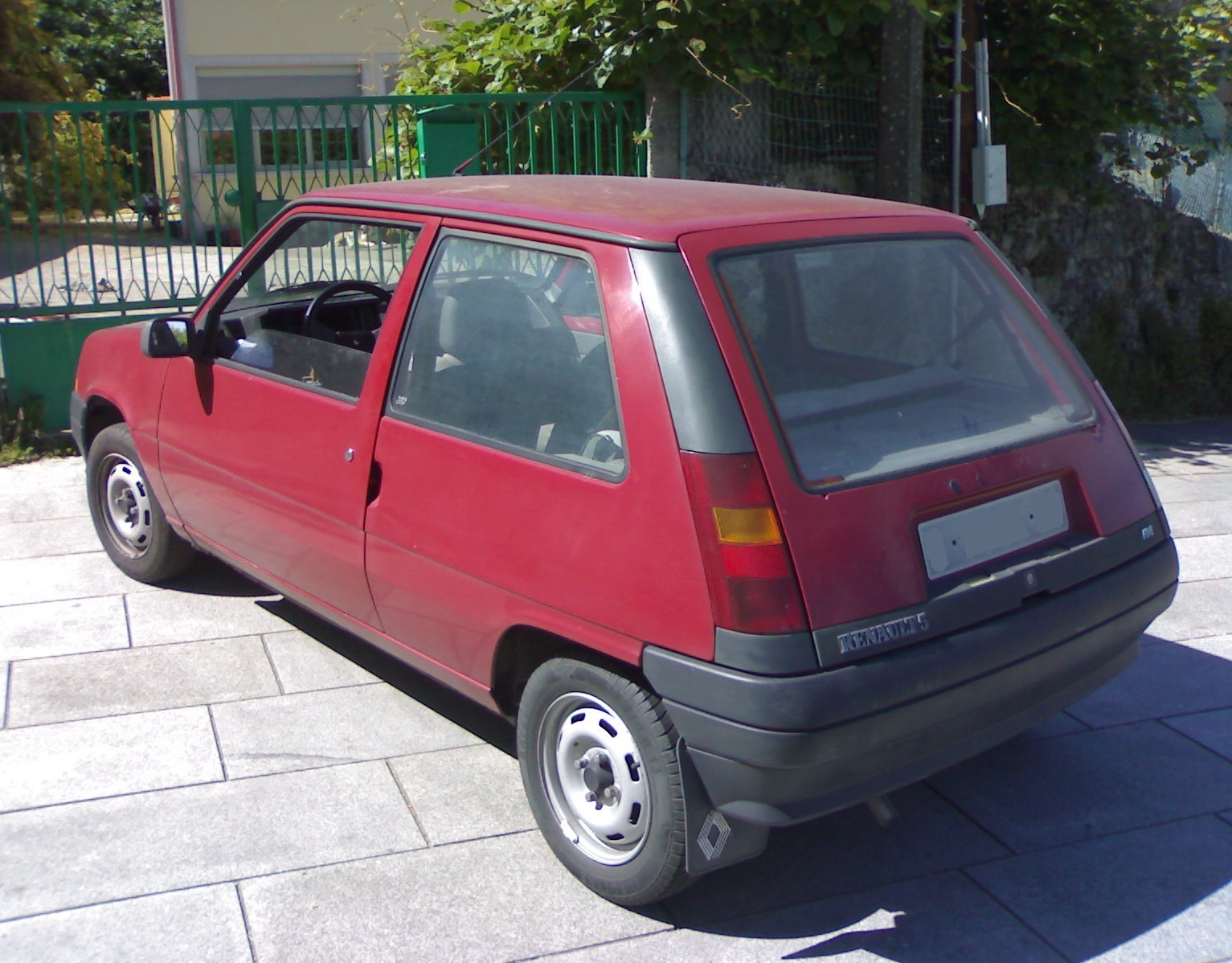
Rear view of a Renault Super 5 Five.

The bodywork of the vehicle is made of pressed sheet metal, forming a welded assembly that ensures the rigidity of the structure. The bumpers and side mouldings are made of reinforced polyester, a mixture of synthetic resin with pressed and polymerized fiberglass. The Super 5 was designed to be longer, wider and lower than the R5; the nose was sharpened, a change that results in a wedge shape reminiscent of the Peugeot 205. The set of changes to the exterior of the car constitute an improvement in aerodynamics, since the drag coefficient of the vehicle is 0.36 compared to 0.38 of its predecessor.

Exterior paint is available in solid and metallic colours. The colour range covers a total of fifty different shades, distributed among varieties of grey, blue, red, green and light colours (white, beige and yellow). The colouring process consisted of three phases; in the first, the bodywork was prepared by priming, then two coats of paint, solid or metallic, were applied, and finally varnishing.

=== Engine ===
The 5 is a front-wheel drive vehicle with a transverse front-engine layout, derived from the Renault 9/11. The engines used were the Cléon-Fonte or "Sierra" engines, which had appeared in models of the French brand since 1962, and the "F-type" diesel and petrol engines. Despite the age of the Sierra engines, their performance allowed it to be on a par with the competition, but Renault's conservatism was heavily criticized by the automotive press of the time, as the engine produced a lot of noise at high speeds. It has a twelve-degree rearward tilt, forming a unit with the gearbox and the differential group. The cylinder head is made of aluminium and lubrication is forced-feed using a gear pump. Cooling is by water in a sealed circuit protected down to −20 °C with turbine circulation and an automatically operated fan.

The range includes from the 1.1-litre displacement and 48 bhp maximum power of the C version to the 1.4-litre displacement and 120 bhp maximum power of the GT Turbo versions. Each cylinder has 2 valves, lubricated by a light alloy crankcase system and with a compression ratio of 7.9:1. All this provides a maximum torque of 8 to 10.4 kg·m at 5250–5750 rpm and a maximum power ranging between 35 kW (48 PS / 48 bhp) and 88 kW (122 PS / 120 bhp). The Renault Super 5 (GT Turbo) can accelerate from 0 to 100 km/h (62 mph) in 7.7 seconds and reach a top speed of 204 km/h (127 mph).

Power is transmitted to the wheels by a manual transmission — although there are some versions with automatic transmission — of four or five speeds plus reverse gear mounted at the front. The clutch is a single dry plate with elastic coupling, with a ball-guided and self-centering release bearing.

==== Gear ratios ====
The following table shows the gear ratios of the five speeds plus reverse of the Renault Super 5. The gear ratio is understood as the ratio between the wheel and the pinion. For example, a gear ratio of 4:1 means that for each complete turn of the gear pinion, the wheel turns four times.

Gear	1	2	3	4	5	Reverse
Ratio	3.09:1	1.84:1	1.32:1	0.96:1	0.75:1	3.73:1

=== Chassis ===
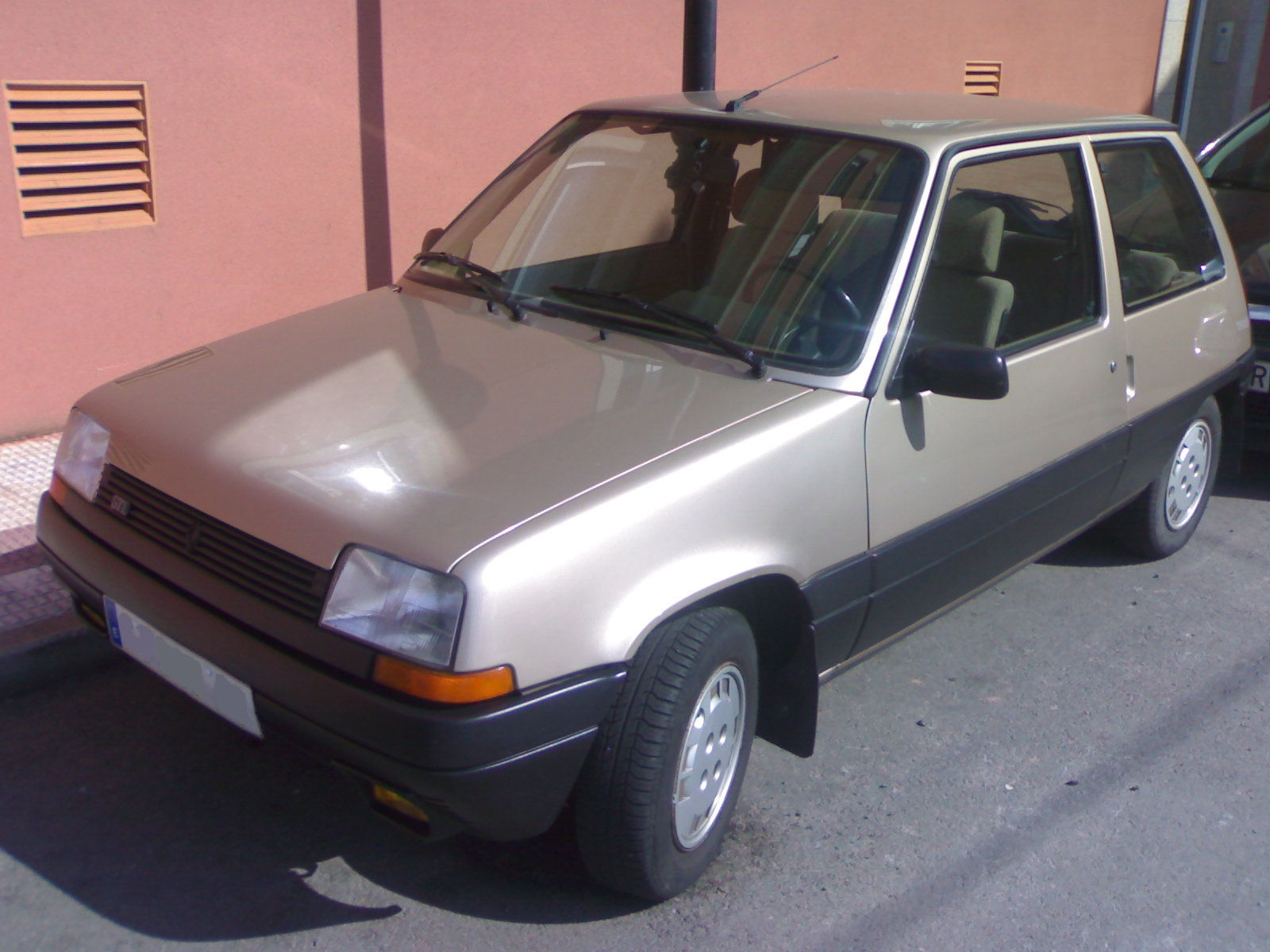
A first series Renault Super 5 GTL.

The chassis of the Super 5 is a monocoque made of welded unibody sheet metal. A process called phosphating was applied, which consists of the anti-corrosion phosphating and passivation of layers of zinc and chromic acid. Once this stage was completed, the chassis received a second treatment, electrophoretic deposition or EPD, an industrial procedure that allows depositing a sub-layer of protection for the vehicle's paint, taking advantage of the mobility of particles in suspension after the application of an electric field, a technique generally known as electrophoresis. The process was completed with other finishing stages after the application of the enamel; sealant, a thin uniform layer over the colour, and gravel-proof paint, which protected the underside of the car from gravel thrown up by the wheels.

The suspension is of the MacPherson strut type, which provides a support point for the steering and acts as the pivot point for the wheel. It features a lower wishbone, coil springs and telescopic double-acting hydraulic shock absorbers with bump stops. In addition, at the rear there are two transverse torsion bars of 18 mm diameter, 20.8 mm in the Turbo version. Each axle is equipped with a transverse anti-roll bar; the front one of 22 mm diameter, 21 mm in the Turbo version, and the rear one of 15.5 mm, two bars of 23.4 mm in the Super 5 Turbo.

=== Wheels ===
Depending on the version, the Super 5 could be fitted with one type of wheel or another. The most common was 325 mm (12.8 in) (13 inches) with a width of 165 mm (6.5 in) on both the front and rear. Generally the tyres were Michelin or Pirelli, with codes ranging from 145/70 R 13 for the Five to 175/70 R 13 for the GTD. The most common code, present on the Automatic, Baccara, GTL and GTX versions, is 165/65 R 13.

The brakes are hydraulic, with a MasterVac vacuum servo and X-split independent distribution, one circuit for the left front and right rear wheels and another circuit for the right front and left rear wheels. This system is fed by a tandem master cylinder. The front brakes are disc and have a diameter of 236 mm (9.3 in), with six-piston calipers. The rear brakes are drum — except in the Turbo version, where they are also disc – and have a diameter of 190 mm (7.5 in), with four-piston calipers. The vehicle has a safety device that warns the driver of any incident related to the braking system and a braking limiter, variable depending on the load supported by the rear axle, which prevents locking. As in most cars, the parking brake acts on the rear wheels.

== Critical reception ==
In general, the vehicle received positive reviews, although some critics said it was too similar to the R5 or that the engine was too noisy at high speeds due to its age. In contrast, some media praised aspects such as the habitability, the comfort or the performance during driving as well as the steering or the braking system.

Paul Scott, of the British magazine Car Magazine, commented:

It may be that the new R5 does not set the trend like its predecessor, but it is good enough to become the best in its class.

— Paul Scott

The publication Autopista carried out a comparative test between the Super 5 and two of its competitors, the Citroën AX and the Peugeot 205. The tester criticized the noise level of the "Sierra" engine at high revs, the high fuel consumption of the larger displacement versions – compared to the simpler versions, which stood out for their low fuel consumption – as well as its acceleration after gear changes, which he described as "could be better". On the other hand, he approved the braking system and the gear change, "smooth and precise" he stated. He highlighted the Super 5's comfort and interior habitability compared to the other two models in the comparison and added that:

If we want good comfort, but also the possibility of reaching high cruising speeds, the Renault 5 GTX is a wise choice.

— Autopista

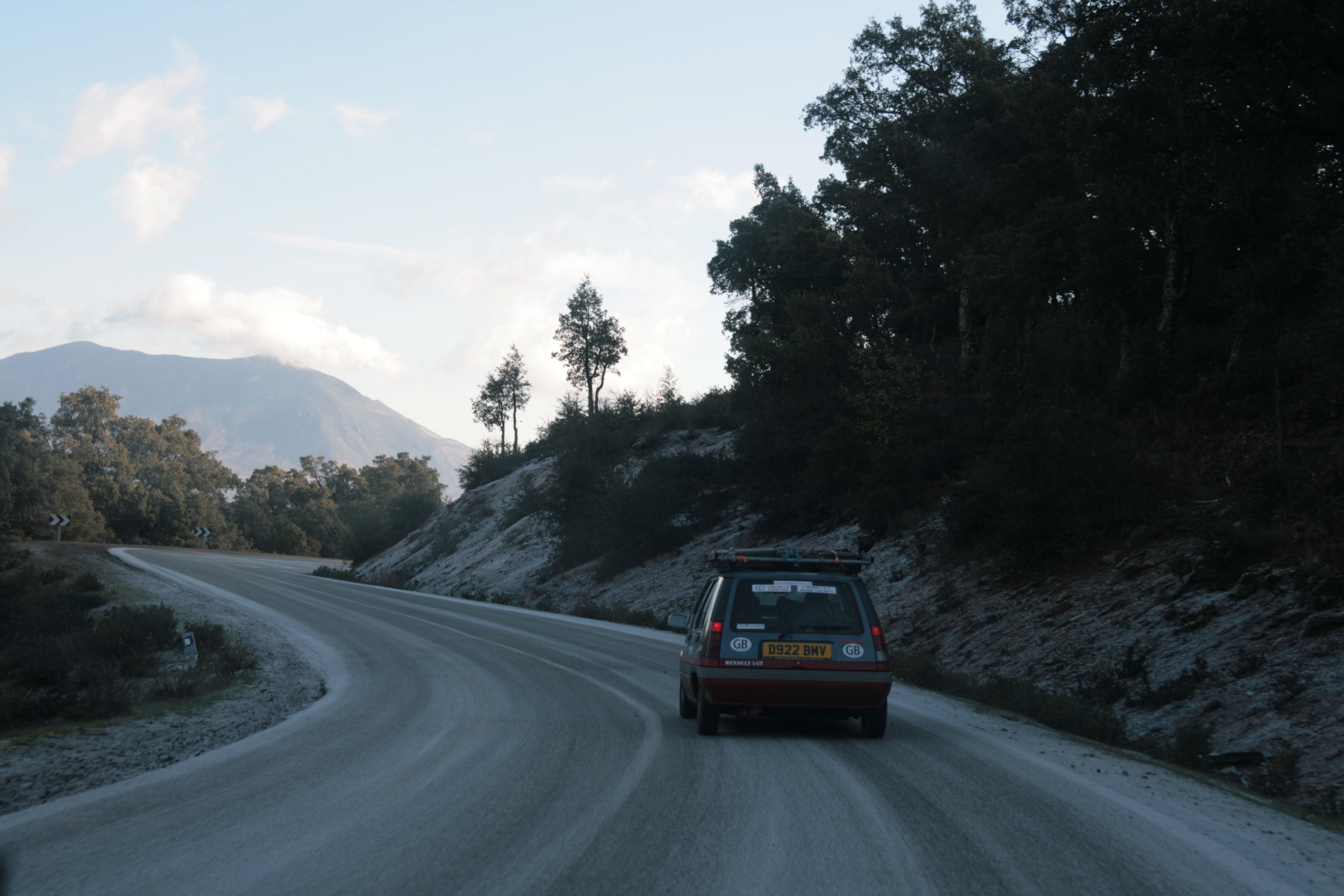
Critic Michel Gegan travelled more than 2,000 kilometres in a Renault Super 5 for his report Les aventures de Supercinq!

The French edition of the magazine Auto Hebdo published on 27 September 1984 a report, entitled "Les aventures de Supercinq!", where the critic Michel Gegan narrated the experience of travelling 2,134 kilometres across France with the new Renault model. He started from Montlhéry, a town near Paris, and passed through the cities of Orléans, Saintes, Bordeaux, Carcassonne, Arles, Avignon, Lyon or Fontainebleau among other smaller towns before ending his journey in the French capital. His opinion of the Super 5 was very positive; he admired its habitability and interior comfort, the engine performance, its handling level, the bodywork finishes and its silhouette, which was reminiscent of the R5. However, Gegan also negatively criticized said resemblance between the two generations – something that was still uncommon in B-segment vehicles at the time – for which he said the following: "The silhouette seems (too) familiar to me." He also negatively evaluated the poor grip of the tyres on wet pavement.

Jean Pierre Malcher, of Action Automobile, analyzed the Super 5 within the special dedicated to the 1984 Paris Motor Show. He highlighted its driving performance, its Master-Vac braking system, its consumption levels, its habitability and comfort, as well as the simplicity of its design. On the other hand, certain aspects such as that only the three-door version was available, that it had such basic equipment, its unsightly side mouldings and its price – high compared to similar models such as the Fiat Uno, the Ford Fiesta, the Talbot Samba or the Opel Corsa (Note: The prices offered by Action Automobile were those of the Peugeot 205 (53,700–59,200 francs), Talbot Samba (52,400 francs), Austin Metro (51,400 francs), Fiat Uno (45,200–50,500 francs), Ford Fiesta (49,700–60,200 francs), Mitsubishi Colt (59,695 francs), Opel Corsa (53,800 francs) and Volkswagen Polo (62,200 francs), as well as that of the Supercinco itself (53,700–61,900 francs).) — were disapproved by the French publication.

Critic Sergio Piccione, of the Spanish weekly Motor 16, positively evaluated different aspects already approved by other publications, such as comfort, habitability, stability and aerodynamics. However, he criticized that Renault used an old engine like the "Sierra", which caused a lot of noise at high speeds. (Note: Although by the mid-1980s the use of the Cléon-Fonte engine was already negatively evaluated due to its age, it continued to be fitted in later models such as the Renault Twingo or the first generation of the Renault Clio until it was replaced by the Energy engine. At the same time, until 2004, versions derived from the original "Sierra" were fitted in vehicles assembled in Romania – by Dacia, Renault's subsidiary in that country – and Argentina.) He also referred to the limited mobility of the front seats, which limited the space in the rear:

The new seats, of the single-guide type, allow worse accessibility to the rear seats than in the old one [...] In the current one, it is only the backrest that folds down, leaving a very small gap to pass legs through to the rear.

— Sergio Piccione

In 2000, when production of the Super 5 had already ceased, Auto Retro dedicated a special to the Super 5, no longer as a novelty, but as a classic. Journalist Thibaut Amant praised the car itself, especially the Turbo version. He admired its performance and reliability, as well as its brakes and steering. The only flaw pointed out was the equipment, which he described as "mediocre". Already in a more relaxed and impartial tone, he rejected it for being "the favorite car of Gilles Labrouche [photographer of the report]" and because "I like the original much more".

== Versions ==
Between 1984 and 1996, Renault marketed twenty-two different versions of the Super 5, twelve years in which new models and improvements to previous models alternated. The differences from one version to another were generally mechanical, such as power, displacement, engine characteristics, weight, braking system and sometimes interior features. Between the first and last versions, some aesthetic differences can be seen, both interior and exterior. The most notable is the position of the logo; while in models produced between 1984 and 1988 the Renault symbol was located in the central part of the grille, from 1988 it was placed on the right side. The following table shows the specific characteristics of each version of the Renault Super 5:

Technical specifications

Model	Production period	Engine	Displacement (cc)	Power (PS)	Max torque (kg·m)	Top speed (km/h)	Fuel	Speeds	Brakes front/rear
Super 5 C	1984–1987	C1C-700	1108	48 @ 5250 rpm	8 @ 2500 rpm	137	Petrol	4	Disc; Drum
Super 5 TL	1984–1985	C1E-750	1237	50 @ 5250 rpm	8 @ 2500 rpm	143	Petrol	4	Disc; Drum
Super 5 TC	1985–1987	C1C-400	956	42 @ 5250 rpm	8 @ 2500 rpm	137	Petrol	4	Disc; Drum
Super 5 TD	1985–1987	F8M‑404	1595	55 @ 5250 rpm	8 @ 2500 rpm	150	Diesel	5	Disc; Drum
Super 5 GTL	1984–1987	C1J-768	1397	58 @ 5250 rpm	10.4 @ 2500 rpm	158	Petrol	5	Disc; Drum
Super 5 GTS	1984–1987	C2J-780	1397	72 @ 5250 rpm	10.6 @ 2500 rpm	167	Petrol	5	Disc; Drum
Super 5 Automatic	1985–1987	C2J-780	1397	68 @ 5250 rpm	10.6 @ 2500 rpm	154	Petrol	3	Disc; Drum
Super 5 GTD	1985–1987	F8M-730	1595	57 @ 3800 rpm	10.4 @ 2250 rpm	150	Diesel	5	Disc; Drum
Super 5 TS	1985–1987	C2J-720	1397	72 @ 5250 rpm	10.4 @ 2500 rpm	167	Petrol	5	Disc; Drum
Super 5 TSE	1984–1987	C2J-403	1397	72 @ 5250 rpm	10.4 @ 2500 rpm	167	Petrol	5	Disc; Drum
Super 5 GT Turbo	1985–1987	C1J-782	1397	115 @ 5750 rpm	16.8 @ 3000 rpm	197	Petrol	5	Disc; Disc
Super 5 Five	1987–1993	C1E-400	1108	47 @ 5250 rpm	9 @ 2550 rpm	143	Petrol	5	Disc; Drum
Super 5 SL	1987–1989	C1E-400	1108	47 @ 5250 rpm	9 @ 2500 rpm	143	Petrol	5	Disc; Drum
Super 5 SR	1987–1989	C1G-400	1237	55 @ 5250 rpm	9 @ 2500 rpm	150	Petrol	5	Disc; Drum
Super 5 SD	1987–1989	F8M-400	1595	55 @ 5250 rpm	9 @ 2500 rpm	150	Diesel	5	Disc; Drum
Super 5 TR	1987–1990	C1G-700	1237	55 @ 5250 rpm	9 @ 2550 rpm	155	Petrol	5	Disc; Drum
Super 5 GTR	1987–1990	C1G-700	1237	55 @ 5250 rpm	8 @ 2500 rpm	155	Petrol	5	Disc; Drum
Super 5 Automatic	1987–1991	C2J-401	1397	68 @ 5250 rpm	9 @ 2550 rpm	154	Petrol	3	Disc; Drum
Super 5 GTX	1987–1990	F2N-740	1721	90 @ 5500 rpm	13.8 @ 3500 rpm	184	Petrol	5	Disc; Drum
Super 5 Baccara	1987–1990	F2N-700	1721	90 @ 5250 rpm	15 @ 3500 rpm	184	Petrol	5	Disc; Drum
Super 5 GT Turbo	1988–1991	C1J-788	1397	120 @ 5750 rpm	16.8 @ 3750 rpm	204	Petrol	5	Disc; Disc
Super 5 Saga	1990–1996	C3J-700	1390	60 @ 5250 rpm	10 @ 2500 rpm	149	Petrol	5	Disc; Drum

== Limited editions ==
Special/limited editions (Renault Super 5)

- NRJ (1986)

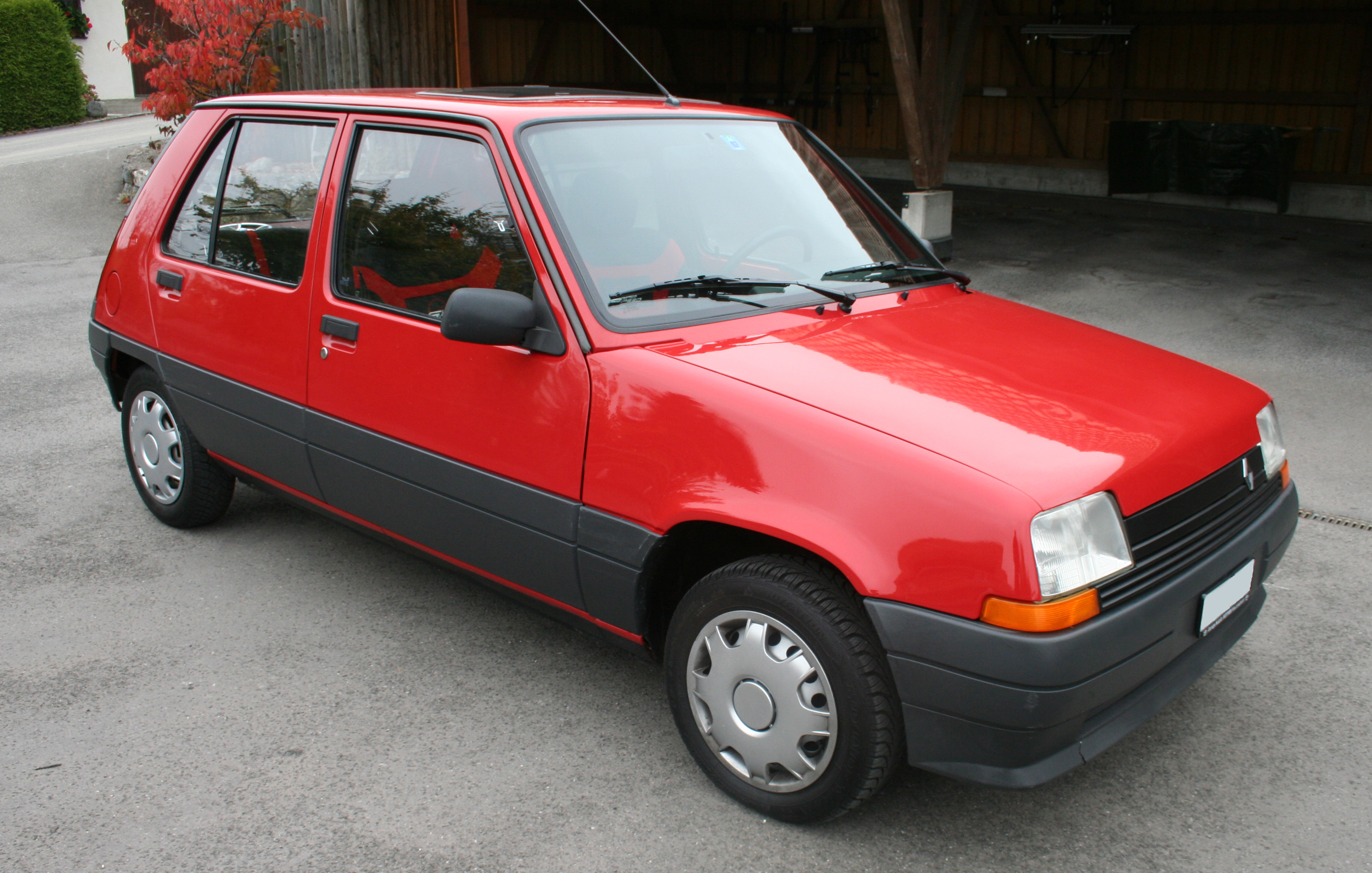
Several limited series were created based on the TL version, such as NRJ, Rio, Primus, Podium, FM, ID and Tiga.

The NRJ limited edition went on sale in France in August 1986. Its name refers to NRJ, the main French radio station. The station's logo appears on the sides and rear, as well as on one of the optional wheel sets of the vehicle. The Super 5 NRJ could be red, black or blue; it was available in the TC, TL and GTS versions, with 42, 47 and 72 bhp respectively. It also featured reclining seats, velour upholstery, digital clock and stereo cassette player, halogen headlamps, power windows, central locking and front fog light. (Note: In French the acronym NRJ is pronounced èn èr jie, phonetically the same as the word energy, énergie.)

- Panache

The Panache limited edition went on sale in the United Kingdom in October 1986. The logo consists of the word "Panache" in red letters on a line of the same colour, located on the rear. The colour range only included black; it was available in the GTS version, with 68 bhp. Being a model destined for the British market, the steering wheel is on the right side. It also featured reclining seats, upholstery identical to that of the NRJ series, quartz clock, side air vents on the dashboard, windscreen wipers with variable speed control, front interior light, cassette player, halogen headlamps, power windows, central locking, fog light and sunroof.

- Rio

The Rio limited edition went on sale in the United Kingdom in 1987. The logo consists of the word "Rio" in blue or red on a yellow circle and located on the rear, two stripes with the same colours as the logo run along the sides. The colour range comprised two shades, red and light grey; it was available in the TC and TL versions, with 42 and 50 bhp respectively. Being a model destined for the British market, the steering wheel is on the right side. It also featured reclining seats, upholstery identical to that of the NRJ series, heater, quartz clock, sunroof, windscreen wipers with variable speed control, front interior light and cassette player.

- Flash

The Flash limited edition went on sale in the Netherlands in February 1987. The logo appears in red capital letters on the rear. The colour range included red and grey; it was available in the TC, GTL and TD versions, with 42, 64 and 50 bhp respectively. It also featured reclining seats with special series upholstery, heater, quartz clock and side air vents on the dashboard. Its slogan was Coup de coeur pour un coup de flash. (Note: Can be translated from French as "In love with a flash".)

- First

The First limited edition went on sale in 1987. The logo consists of the word "First" in gold on a rectangular black background and appears on the sides. The colour range included white, red and grey; it was available in the SL and Five versions, both with 47 bhp. It also featured reclining seats, heater, side air vents on the dashboard, quartz clock and tinted glass.

- Le Mans

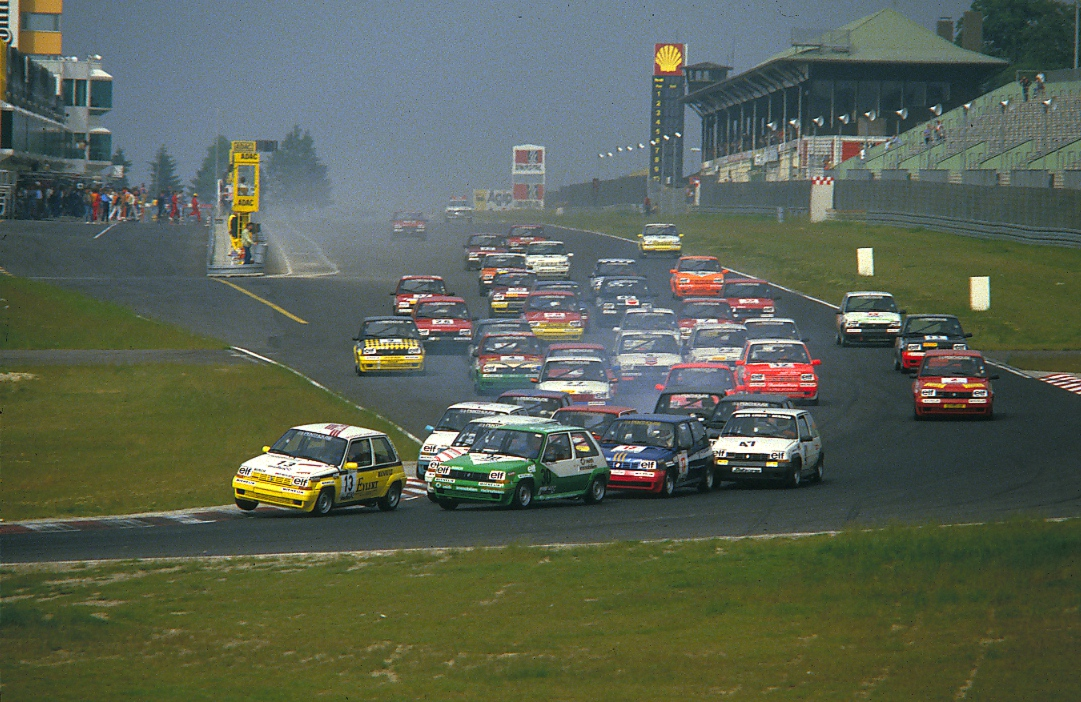
Le Mans is an endurance race held annually in France as well as the name of a Renault limited series in Switzerland. Pictured are about fifty Super 5 at the Nürburgring circuit, Germany.

The Le Mans limited edition went on sale in Switzerland in 1987. Its name refers to the 24 Hours of Le Mans, an endurance race held in June at the Circuit de la Sarthe, near Le Mans, France. The logo appears next to the front doors, the series name in black capital letters. The colour range only included white and the only version available was the GTX, with 90 bhp. It also featured right-hand mirror, heater, fog light, windscreen wipers with variable speed control, reclining seats, sports upholstery, door pockets on the front doors, side air vents on the dashboard, quartz clock, three-spoke steering wheel and gear shift covered in leather. These last two features, among others, made the interior very similar to a Super 5 GT Turbo.

- New Man

The New Man limited edition went on sale in 1987. The Super 5 New Man was grey; it was available in the GTX version, with 90 bhp. It also featured fog light, windscreen wipers with variable speed control, reclining seats, door pockets on the front doors, side air vents on the dashboard, quartz clock, GT Turbo steering wheel and gear shift, and sunroof.

- Schuss

The Schuss limited edition went on sale in France in February 1988. The Schuss logo appears in green on the sides and rear, as well as inside. The colour range included white and grey; it was available in the GTR, GTS and GTD versions, with 55, 68 and 55 bhp respectively. It also featured reclining seats, heater, PVC floor mats, quartz clock, loudspeakers, halogen headlamps, power windows, central locking, windscreen wipers with variable speed control and fog light.

- Spring (Germany)

The Spring limited edition went on sale in Germany in 1988. Its name refers to the spring season, Spring in English. The logo with green letters appears on the sides and rear, a line of the same green as the logo covers the lower bodywork. The colour range included grey and white; it was available in the GTR and GTD versions, with 60 and 55 bhp respectively. It also featured reclining seats, heater, PVC floor mats, quartz clock, loudspeakers, halogen headlamps, power windows, interior-adjustable mirrors, central locking, windscreen wipers with variable speed control, front interior light, fog light, rear wiper and cassette player. Its slogan was Der kleine Freund. Hoch dekoriert. (Note: Can be translated from German as "A very well-equipped little friend".)

- Event

The Event limited edition went on sale in the United Kingdom in 1988. The logo consists of the word "Event" in green letters and is located on the sides and on the boot lid, a thin green line runs along the lower body protection. The Super 5 Event emerged as a variant of the French Schuss for the English market. The colour range included white and grey; it was available in the GTR version, with 55 bhp. Being a model destined for the British market, the steering wheel is on the right side. It also featured tinted glass, central locking, power windows, interior-adjustable mirrors, heater, halogen headlamps, fog light, windscreen wipers with variable speed control, leather steering wheel with green highlights, reclining seats, special upholstery, PVC floor mats, door pockets on the front doors, side air vents on the dashboard, quartz clock, cassette player and pre-installation for sound system.

- Fashion

The Fashion limited edition went on sale in the Netherlands in 1988. The logo consists of the word "Fashion" in green letters and is located on the sides and on the boot lid, a thin green line runs along the lower body protection. The Super 5 Fashion emerged as a variant of the French Schuss for the Dutch market. The colour range included white and grey; it was available in the GTR version, with 55 bhp. It also featured tinted glass, central locking, power windows, interior-adjustable mirrors, heater, halogen headlamps, fog light, windscreen wipers with variable speed control, leather steering wheel with green highlights, reclining seats, door pockets on the front doors, side air vents on the dashboard, quartz clock, cassette player and pre-installation for sound system.

- Tropic

The Tropic limited edition went on sale in 1988. Its name refers to the two eponymous imaginary lines that delimit the Intertropical Zone, a geoastronomical zone whose average annual temperature is above 18 °C. The series name is due to the fact that it came standard with air conditioning. The logo consists of the word "Tropic" in green and appears on the sides of the vehicle. The colour range only included white; it was available in the GTL version, with 64 bhp. It also featured tinted glass, central locking, power windows, interior-adjustable mirrors, halogen headlamps, fog light, windscreen wipers with variable speed control, leather steering wheel with green stitching, reclining seats, special upholstery, PVC floor mats, door pockets on the side doors, side air vents on the dashboard, air conditioning, heater, cassette player and quartz clock.

- Triana

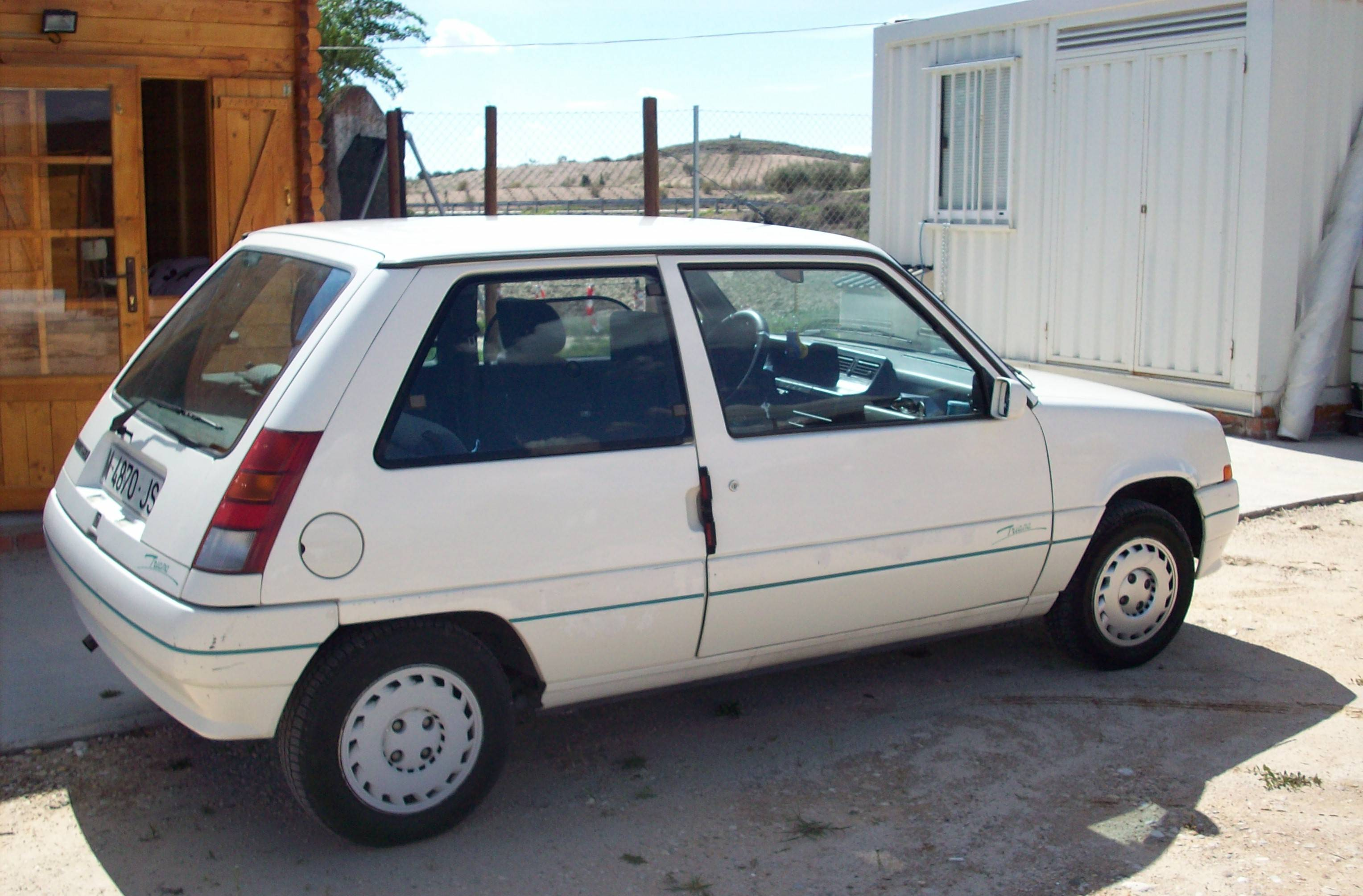
Renault Super 5 Triana.

The Triana limited edition went on sale in Spain in 1988. Its name refers to the eponymous district of the city of Seville, in the south of the country. The series logo appears on the sides; it is the word "Triana" in letters with a capital T that imitate the traditional design of street signs in the Sevillian capital in green, as well as a line that ran along all the side mouldings and bumpers. It is very similar to the Super 5 Saga and FM. The colour range was limited to a white exclusive to this series. The versions available were the GTL with 65 bhp and GTX, with 90 bhp. It featured reclining seats, special upholstery, glove compartments in both front doors, side air vents on the dashboard, quartz clock, loudspeakers, halogen headlamps, power windows (GTX), central locking (GTX), windscreen wipers with variable speed control, front and rear fog lights, Philips radio cassette and heater.

- NRJ (1988)

Given the success of the NRJ limited edition, in 1988 a second edition of this limited series went on sale in France. The station's logo appears on the sides and rear, but is removed from the wheels. The colour range of the second edition included white, red, grey, blue and mint green; it was available in the TR, TL and TD versions, with 55, 47 and 55 bhp respectively. It also featured reclining seats, special upholstery with the colours of the NRJ logo – red and green —, carpet mats, glove compartments in both front doors, side air vents on the dashboard, Blaupunkt stereo cassette player with two rear speakers, tinted glass, interior-adjustable mirrors, fog light, laminated windscreen, windscreen wipers with variable speed control and optional sunroof. 17,000 units were sold. Its commercial slogans were It's summer, with your Super 5 NRJ and La plus allumée des Supercinq. (Note: Can be translated from French as "The brightest Supercinco".)

- Primus

The Primus limited edition went on sale in Germany in 1988. The logo consists of the series name in red italic capital letters, next to an anthropomorphic figure in an upright position. It appears on the sides and rear, next to the license plate. The colour range included white, red, blue, grey and mint green; it was available in the TR and TL versions, with 55 and 50 bhp respectively. It also featured interior-adjustable mirrors, heater, fog light, windscreen wipers with variable speed control, glass sunroof, reclining seats, special green and red upholstery identical to the NRJ, green floor mats, door pockets on the front doors, air vent on the dashboard and pre-installation for the sound system. Its slogan was Der kleine Freund mit Extra-Qualitäten. (Note: Can be translated from German as "The little friend with extra quality".)

- Podium

The Podium limited edition went on sale in the Netherlands in 1988. The logo is similar to that of the Super 5 Primus, consisting of the series name in red italic capital letters, next to an anthropomorphic figure in an upright position. It appears on the sides and rear, next to the license plate. The colour range included white, red and blue; it was available in the TR and TL versions, with 55 and 50 bhp respectively. Podium was the trade name given to the German Primus limited edition in the Netherlands, so it had the same features as the model available in German dealerships.

- FM

The FM limited edition went on sale in Spain in 1988. Its name refers to the initials for frequency modulation, in relation to the Blaupunkt sound system that came standard with the model. The logo consists of the series name in red capital letters with a white border, appearing on the sides. The colour range included white, black, red and grey; it was available in the TL and GTL versions, with 55 and 60 bhp respectively. It also featured tinted glass, interior-adjustable mirrors, halogen headlamps, front and rear fog lights, windscreen wipers with variable speed control, reclining seats, special upholstery, door pockets on the front doors, side air vents on the dashboard, digital clock, Blaupunkt Audio 3010 stereo cassette player, speakers and antenna. Its slogan was Renault 5 FM. On your frequency.

- ID

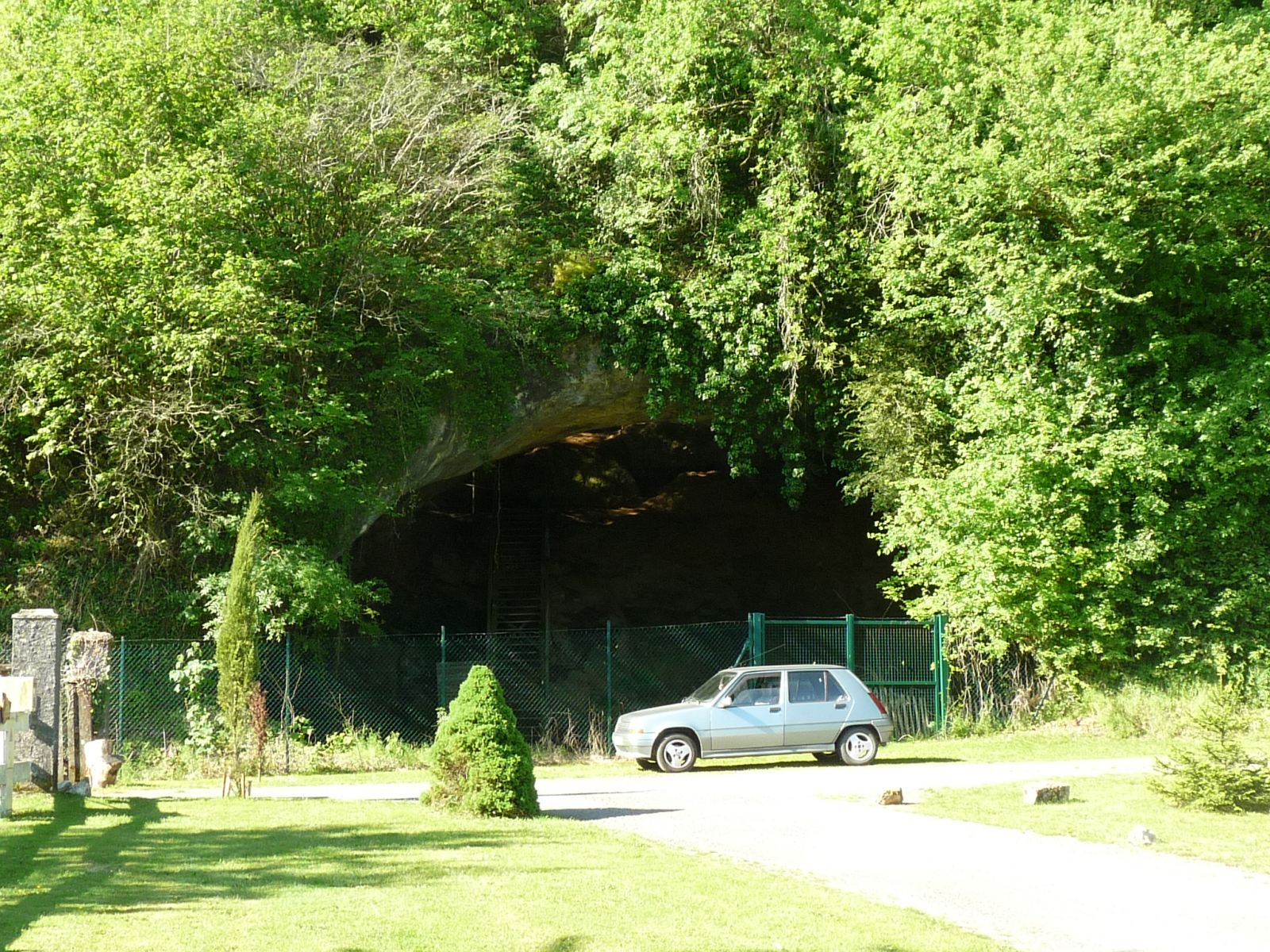
Renault Super 5 Spring in Montbron, France.

The ID limited edition went on sale in the United Kingdom in December 1988. The logo consists of the letters "ID" in yellow within a rectangle, located on the sides, below the front seat windows, and on the right side of the boot lid. The colour range included several shades: white, blue, red, grey and mint green; it was available in the TL and TR versions, with 47 and 55 bhp respectively. Being a model destined for the British market, the steering wheel is on the right side. It also featured sunroof, tinted glass, interior-adjustable mirrors, heater, fog light, windscreen wipers with variable speed control, reclining seats, green and red upholstery — identical to that of the NRJ series —, door pockets on the front doors, central air vent on the dashboard, pre-installed speakers and Philips stereo cassette player.

- Spring (France)

The Spring limited edition went on sale in France in December 1988, with several differences from the German edition. The logo appears on the sides and rear. The colour range included red, white, grey and blue; it was available in the SL, SR and SD versions, with 47, 55 and 55 bhp respectively. It also featured reclining seats, carpet mats, glove compartments in both front doors, side air vents on the dashboard, Blaupunkt stereo cassette player, tinted glass, interior-adjustable mirrors, fog light, laminated windscreen and windscreen wipers with variable speed control. Its slogan was Elle fait fondre l'hiver. (Note: Can be translated from French as "It melts the winter away".)

- Tonic

The Tonic limited edition went on sale in Austria in 1989. The logo consists of the word "Tonic" in black letters next to a stripe of the same colour and is located on the sides and on the front grille. The Super 5 Tonic emerged as a variant of the French Spring for the Austrian market. The colour range included white, red, green and grey; it was available in the SL and SD versions, with 47 and 55 bhp respectively. It had the same features as the French Spring limited edition, except for the cassette player.

- Alain Oreille

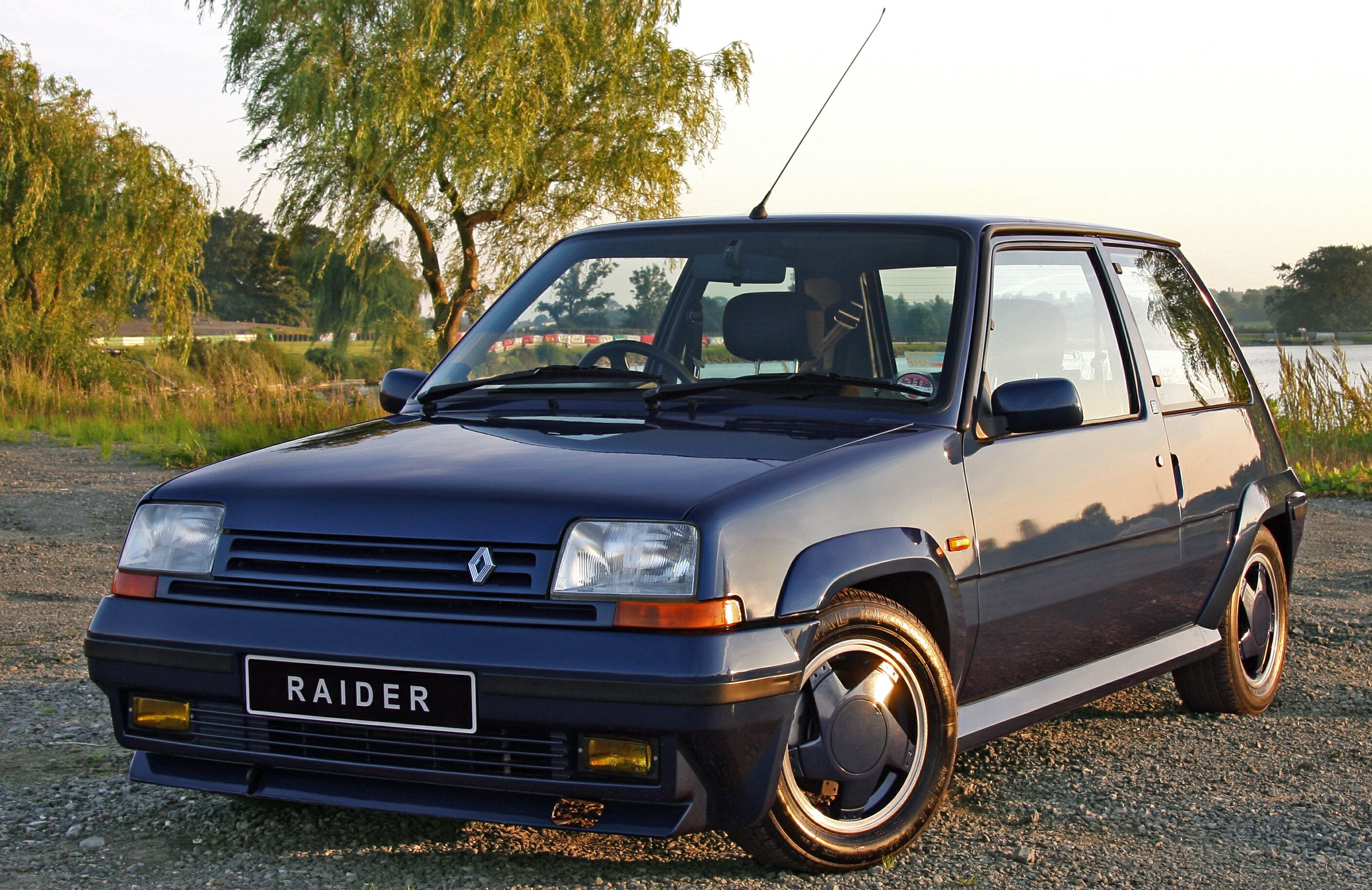
Super 5 GT Turbo Alain Oreille. This limited series went on sale following the success achieved by Renault in the 1989 Rallye Côte d'Ivoire.

The Alain Oreille limited edition went on sale in France in 1989. It takes its name from the French rally driver of the same name, who was declared winner of the 1989 Rallye Côte d'Ivoire at the wheel of a Super 5. The logo appears on the rear of the vehicle. The colour range only included dark blue, the same colour as the logo; the version available was the GT Turbo, with 120 bhp. It also featured heater, tinted glass, interior-adjustable mirrors, halogen headlamps, fog lights, windscreen wipers with variable speed control, reclining seats, special upholstery, central locking, power windows, door pockets on the side doors, Philips stereo cassette player and side air vents on the dashboard. A total of 2000 units were produced.

- Belle Île

The Belle Île limited edition went on sale in France in 1989. It is not just another series, as the bodywork was modified by Car System Style and Gruau, who created a semi-convertible Super 5. The rear part was not covered by sheet metal but by a canvas that could be opened with a zipper. The series name means "beautiful island" in French, its logo is the name in blue letters and appears on the sides as well as on the front grille. The colour range included white for the bodywork and navy blue for the hood or vice versa; the versions available were SL and Five, with 47 bhp each. It also featured fog light, sunroof, windscreen wipers with variable speed control, reclining seats, blue upholstery and door pockets on the front side doors.

- Tiga

The Tiga limited edition went on sale in France and Germany in April 1989. The logo, consisting of the series name in yellow letters, appears on the sides and on the rear next to the license plate. The colour range included white, red, black, grey, blue and green; it was available in the TL, TR and TD versions, with 47, 55 and 55 bhp respectively. It also featured tinted glass, telephone, heater, fog light, windscreen wipers with variable speed control, reclining seats, special blue upholstery, floor mats, door pockets on the front doors, side air vents on the dashboard, cassette player and quartz clock. Its slogan was Complètement fun, la Supercinq Tiga déferle sur vos loisirs et trace pour vous la route du fun!. (Note: Can be translated from French as "Have fun on the road with your Supercinco Tiga!".)

- Beach

The Beach limited edition went on sale in the Netherlands in June 1989. The logo, consisting of the series name with a blue asterisk, appears on the sides and on the rear next to the license plate. The colour range included red, black and grey; it was available in the TR version, with 55 bhp. It also featured tinted glass, interior-adjustable mirrors, heater, fog light, windscreen wipers with variable speed control, reclining seats, special upholstery, floor mats, door pockets on the front doors, central air vent on the dashboard, quartz clock and cassette player with two speakers. Its slogan was Met de Renault 5 Beach wordt uw zomer nog mooier. (Note: Can be translated from Dutch as "Summer is much better with a Renault 5 Beach".)

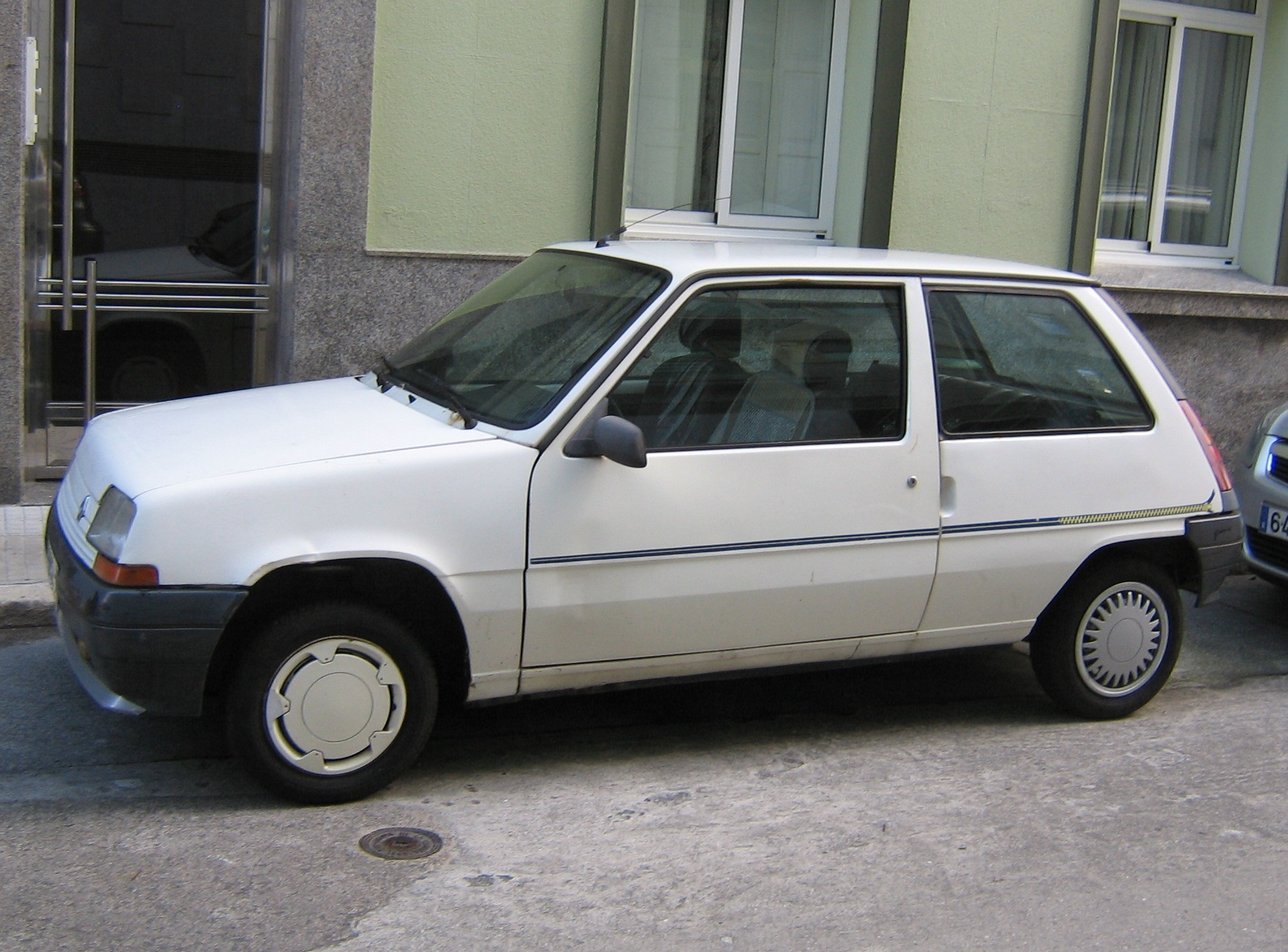
Super 5 Blue Jeans.

- Blue Jeans

The Blue Jeans limited edition went on sale in France in July 1989. The logo, with the inscription "Blue Jeans", imitated the label of a pair of jeans. It appeared on the sides, on the rear and on the seats. The colour range included red, white and blue; it was available in the Five and SL versions, both with 47 bhp. It also featured tinted glass, interior-adjustable mirrors, heater, fog light, windscreen wipers with variable speed control, reclining seats, denim fabric upholstery, floor mats, door pockets on the front doors, central air vent on the dashboard, quartz clock and Philips stereo cassette player with two speakers. Its slogan was Renault invente le 1^{er} Blue Jeans qui roule. (Note: Can be translated from French as "Renault has invented the first moving jeans".)

- Coup de Cœur

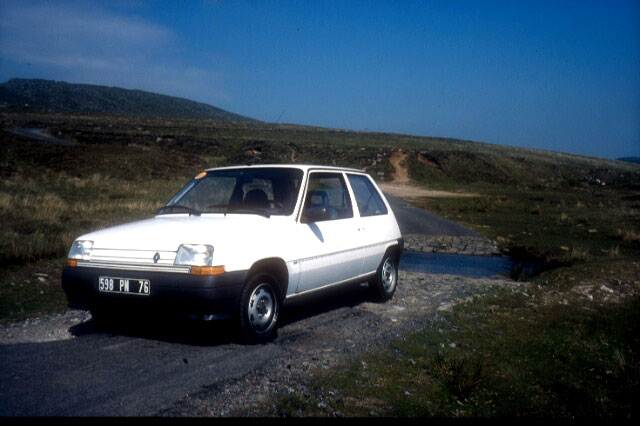
Renault Super 5 Roxane near Exeter, Great Britain.

The Coup de Cœur limited edition went on sale in France on 14 February 1990, coinciding with Valentine's Day. The series name is "lovers" in French, so its advertising campaigns featured couples. The logo is made up of a rabbit holding a red heart, next to the series name. It appeared on the sides, on the rear, on the front seats and on the steering wheel, in place of the Renault emblem. The colour range included black and grey; it was available in the TL and TR versions, with 47 and 55 bhp respectively. It also featured tinted glass, interior-adjustable mirrors, heater, fog light, windscreen wipers with variable speed control, special two-tone upholstery, PVC floor mats, door pockets on the front doors, side air vents on the dashboard, quartz clock and Philips cassette player. It had several slogans, such as Pour les fous du cœur Supercinq or La vie ça roule en Supercinq. (Note: Can be translated from French as "For those madly in love with the Supercinco" and "Life rolls on in a Supercinco".)

- Roxane

The Roxane limited edition went on sale in the Netherlands in 1990. The logo consists of the series name in sea green, located on the sides and rear. The Super 5 Roxane emerged as a variant of the French Coup de Cœur for the Dutch market. The colour range included red and grey; it was available in the Saga version, with 60 bhp. It had the same features as the Coup de Cœur limited edition.

- Hello!

The Hello! limited edition went on sale in 1990. The logo, consisting of the series name in pink, appears on the sides and on the rear next to the license plate. The colour range included grey; it was available in the Five version, with 47 bhp. It also featured tinted glass, interior-adjustable mirrors, heater, fog light, windscreen wipers with variable speed control, reclining seats, special upholstery, floor mats, door pockets on the front doors, side air vents on the dashboard and quartz clock.

- The Famous Five

The Famous Five limited edition went on sale in the United Kingdom in March 1990. Its name, as stated in the catalogs of the time, is because "no small car has more justification for using the adjective 'famous' than the Renault 5. As a 'car about town' or on much longer journeys, the Renault 5 has won a place in the hearts of many millions of enthusiastic owners." (Note: Original in English: No small car has more justification for using the adjective “famous” than the Renault 5. As a 'car about town' or on much longer journeys, the Renault 5 has won a place in the hearts of many millions of enthusiastic owners.) The logo consists of the series name in white with a black border, the three words separated by underscores of the same type. It appears on the sides, above the rear wheels, and on the tailgate next to the license plate. The colour range included two shades, red and black; it was available in the TR and GTR versions, both with 55 bhp. Being a model destined for the British market, the steering wheel is on the right side. It also featured reclining seats, special two-tone upholstery, heater, quartz clock, sunroof, windscreen wipers with variable speed control, Philips cassette player, side air vents on the dashboard, tinted glass and fog light.

- Campus (1991)

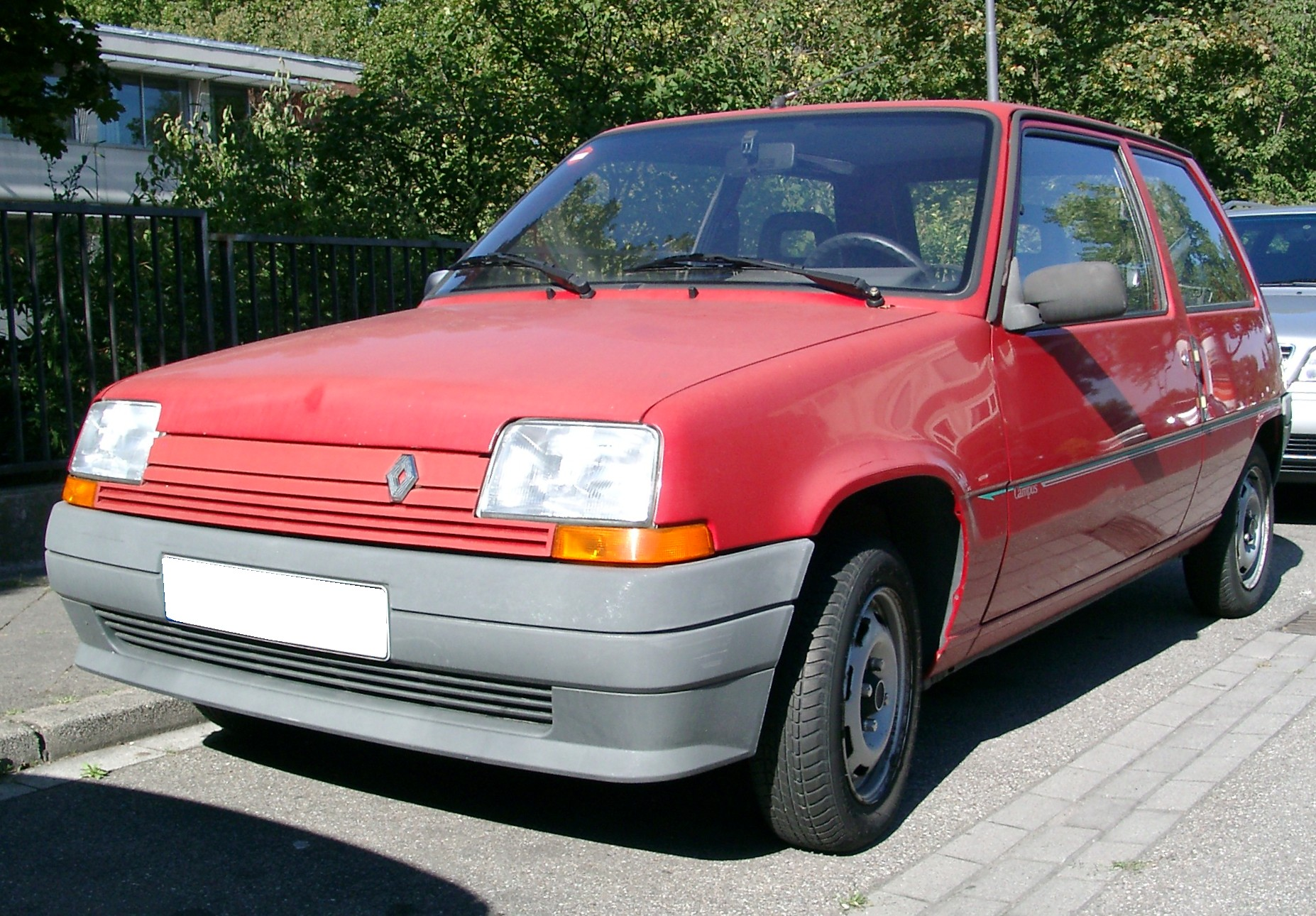
Super 5 Campus.

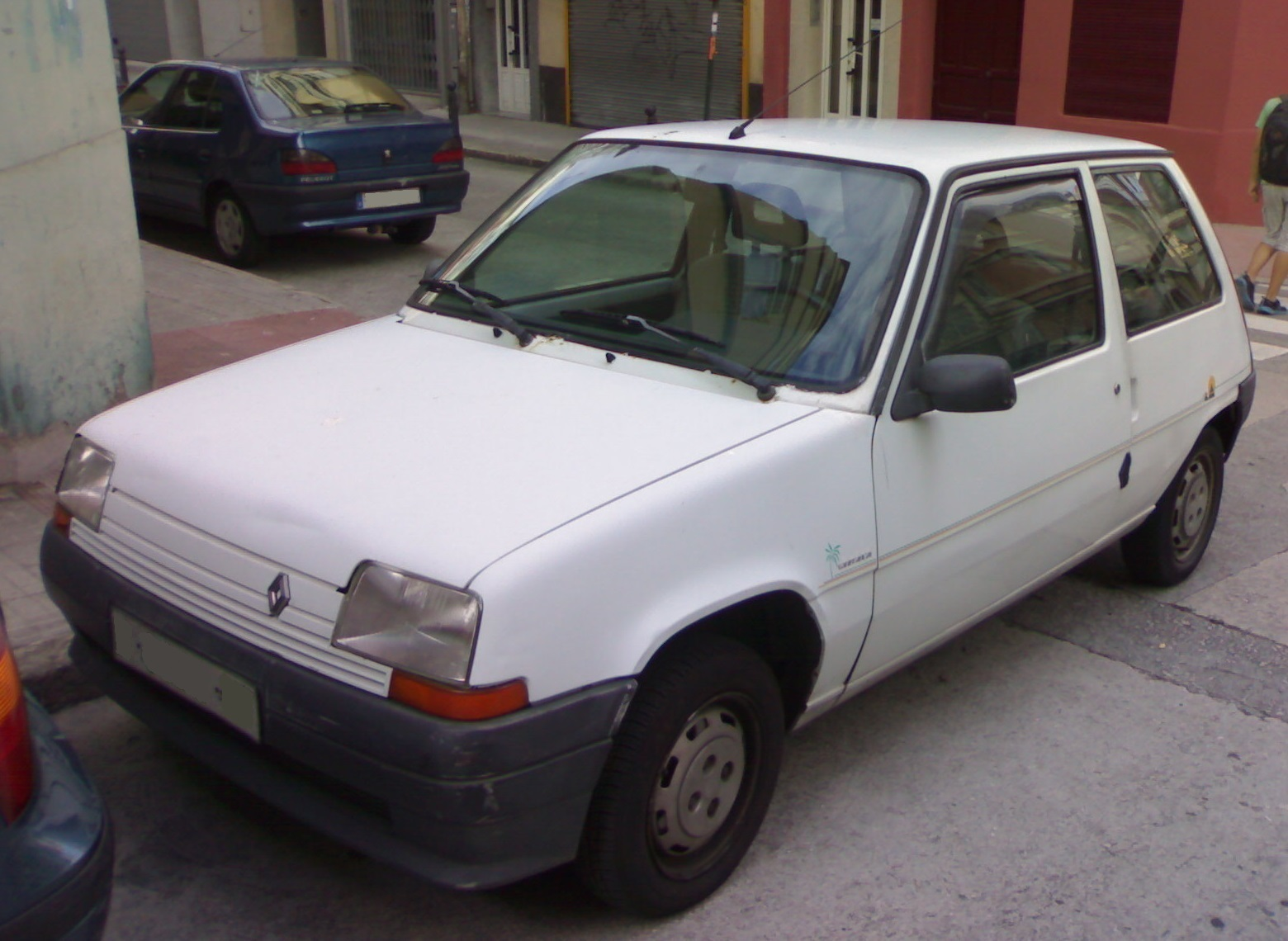
Super 5 Oasis.

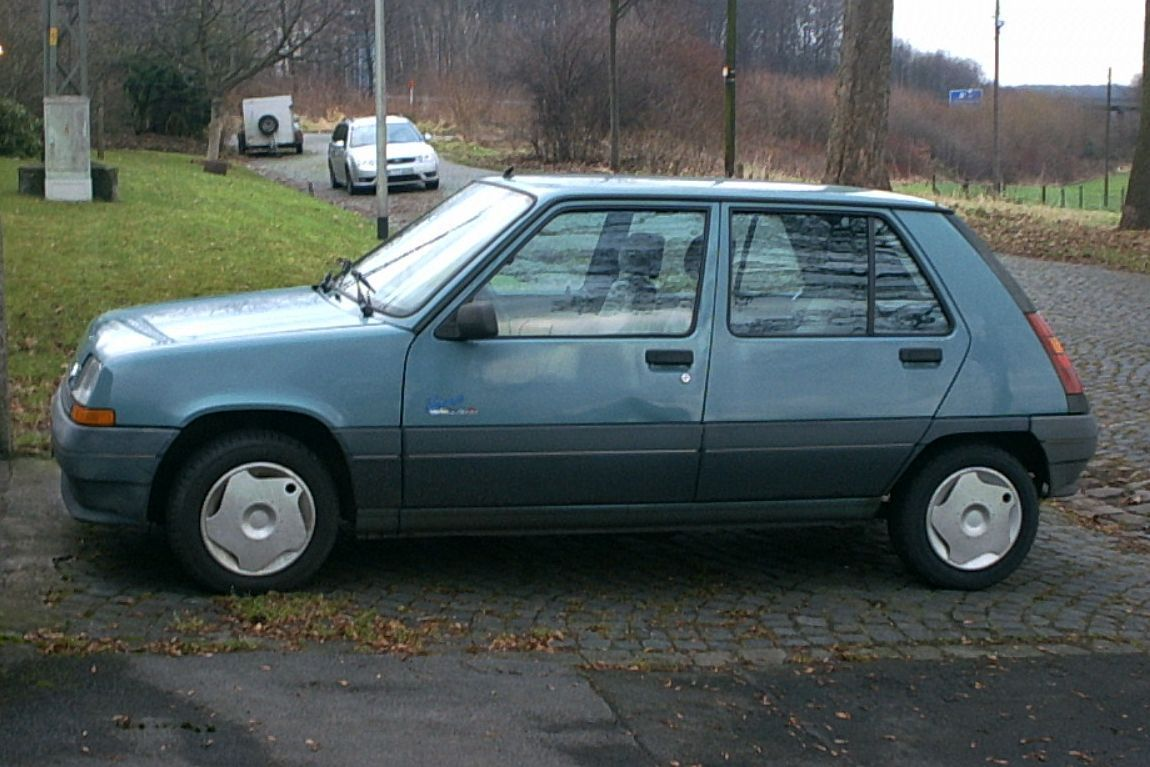
Super 5 Bye Bye. The hubcaps are identical to those of the Renault Clio.

The Campus limited edition went on sale in France in January 1991. The logo, consisting of the series name in light blue letters, appears on the sides and rear. The colour range included navy blue, white and red; it was available in the Five version, with 47 bhp. It also featured tinted glass, fog light, heater, windscreen wipers with variable speed control, reclining seats, specific grey upholstery, door pockets on the front doors, central air vent on the dashboard and Renault 1020, 3020 or 5020 cassette player.

- Oasis

The Oasis limited edition went on sale in Spain in 1991. The logo consists of a palm tree next to the series name, over three superimposed horizontal lines in grey, green and yellow respectively. It appeared on the sides and rear. The colour range included red, white and metallic grey; it was available in the Five version, with 47 bhp and in three and five doors. It also featured tinted glass, removable Philips cassette player, new upholstery – similar to that of the Clio —, tinted glass, optional sunroof, interior-adjustable mirrors, heater, windscreen wipers with variable speed control, side air vents on the dashboard and door pockets. Its slogan was "Buy an Oasis for less than a million [ pesetas]".

- Carte Jeunes

The Carte Jeunes limited edition went on sale in France in 1992. It was not an exclusive series of the Super 5, as there was also a Renault 4 Carte Jeunes. Its name refers to the Youth Card — Carte Jeunes in French – a card available in the European Union that offers various discounts and advantages to those under twenty-five. The series logo is the same as that of the card, it appeared on the sides, on the rear and on the seats. The colour range included red, white and yellow; it was available in the Five and SD versions, with 47 and 55 bhp respectively. It also featured tinted glass, interior-adjustable mirrors, heater, fog light, windscreen wipers with variable speed control, reclining seats, blue upholstery, floor mats, door pockets on the front doors, central air vent on the dashboard, sunroof and cassette player.

- Campus (1993)

Following the success of the Campus limited edition, in 1993 a second edition of this limited series went on sale in France. The logo appears renewed in this new series, consisting of the same name in a colour combination of blue, yellow and red. The colour range of the second edition included the same logo colours, plus white and green; it was available in the Five version, with 55 bhp. It also featured reclining seats, special upholstery, carpet mats, glove compartments in both front doors, side air vents on the dashboard, Philips stereo cassette player, tinted glass, interior-adjustable mirrors, fog light, laminated windscreen and windscreen wipers with variable speed control.

- Bye Bye

The Bye Bye limited edition was produced between March and December 1996 at the Renault-Revoz factory in Novo Mesto, Slovenia. It was the last limited series to go on sale before definitively ending production of the Super 5, hence its name, "Goodbye" in English. The logo consists of the series name over three drawn Super 5, in blue, red and grey respectively. It appeared only on the rear. The colour range included red, blue, grey and white; it was available in the Saga version, with 60 bhp. Interior-wise, it had the same features as the Renault Clio, a model with which it bore a great resemblance, especially in terms of the interior. A total of 12,000 units were sold.

== Derivatives ==
=== Renault Express ===
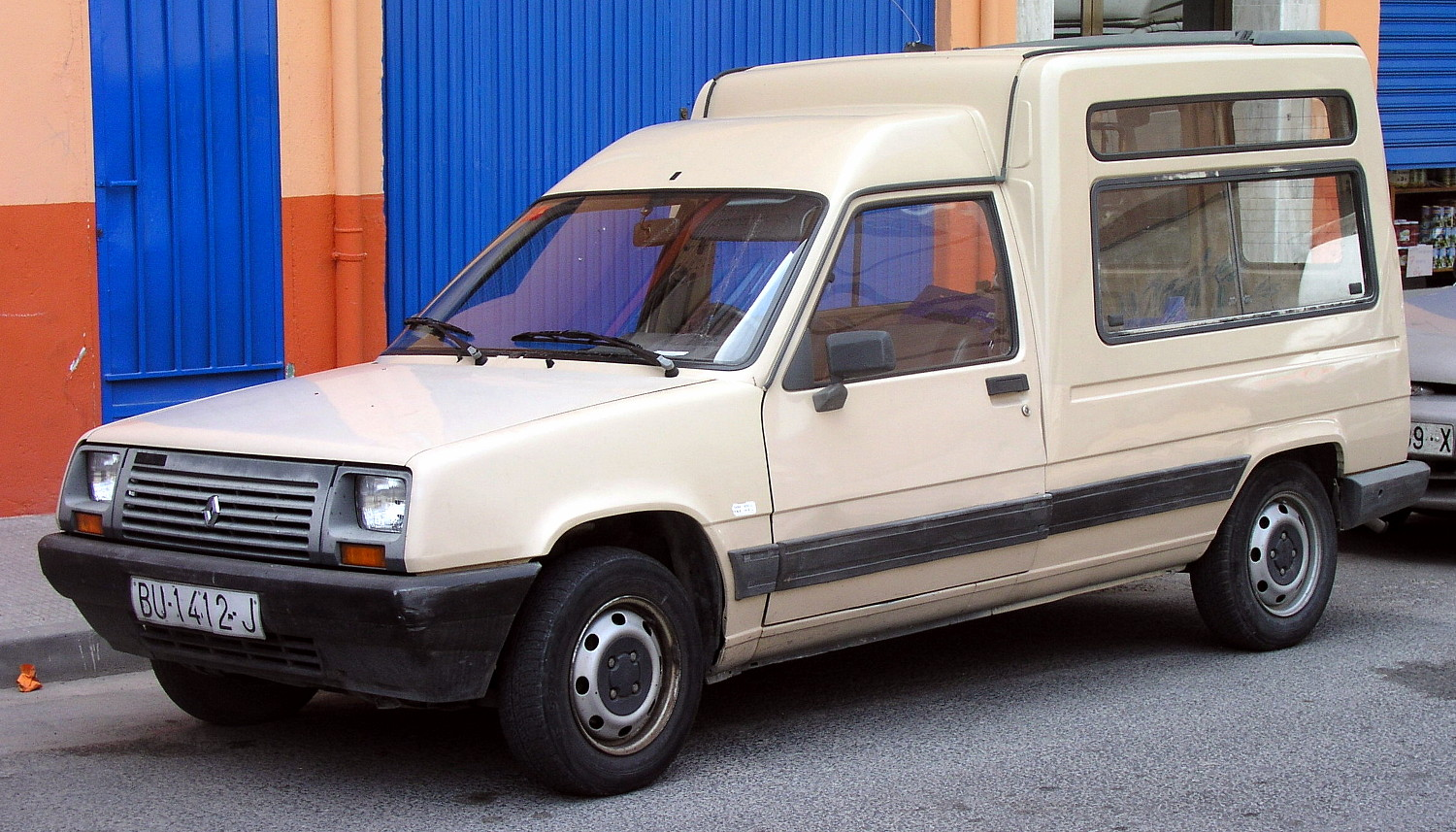
A Phase 1 (1985–1991) Renault Express, registered in 1986.

The Renault Express, called Renault Rapid in Germany and Austria and Renault Extra in the United Kingdom and Ireland, is a van produced by Renault between 1985 and 2002, built on the basis of the Super 5. It replaced the Renault 4 F6, a commercial vehicle based on the Renault 4. The available versions of the Express were three: van, estate and pick-up, although the latter was the least common.

The technical characteristics were the same as those of the Super 5, as the only difference was the structural design. Aesthetically, it underwent two facelifts to make it more similar to the contemporary range, the first in 1991 and the second in 1994. From 1997 its production decreased, when it was replaced by Renault's new van, the Kangoo. In 2000, production in Europe ended after 1,730,000 units had been produced. It continued to be manufactured until 2002 in Uruguay by the company Nordex S.A. This company had been producing it since 1996 for sale in the Mercosur member states.

=== EBS Cabriolet ===
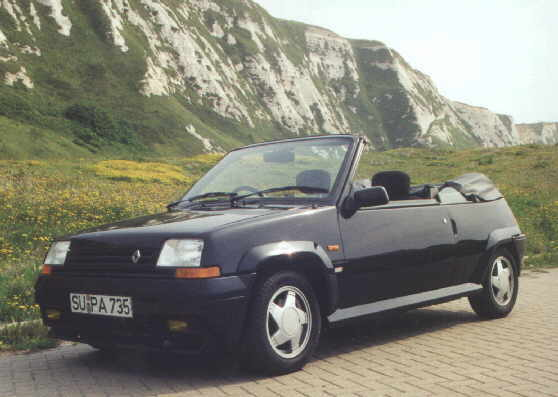
1989 EBS Cabriolet GT Turbo in Kent, United Kingdom.

Just as Peugeot did with the 205 following the agreement with Pininfarina, Renault wanted to create a convertible version of the Super 5. In 1984, the French brand agreed with Ernst Berg, president of the Belgian coachbuilding firm EBS, on the design of a cabrio version. The model devised by Berg was exhibited at the Amsterdam Motor Show; it eliminated the side windows and any part of the standard version mounted above the doors. These parts were manufactured in Portugal and by eliminating them, costs were greatly reduced, since their import was no longer necessary. EBS anticipated that the Cabriolet would be produced at the Vilvoorde factory, at a rate of twenty-five units per day.

But the idea that a special model, such as the EBS Cabriolet, would have a price lower than that of the Super 5 itself displeased Renault. Faced with this situation, production of the Super 5 in Belgium was discontinued and replaced by that of the Renault 21. This meant that the Super 5 Cabriolet would have to be manufactured entirely at EBS's facilities. To create a Cabriolet, the firm chaired by Berg would take a Super 5, dismantle it and remove the roof with a chainsaw. Subsequently, all interior features as well as the hood were added. This production technique made the car very expensive, so its commercial life was very limited. EBS produced a total of 1400 units, which were only available in the Netherlands and Germany.

Despite the failure of the EBS Cabriolet, Renault did not want to give up the idea of a convertible Super 5. Thus, in 1989 and following an agreement with the coachbuilder Gruau, the Belle Île limited edition went on sale. It was characterized by the fact that the rear part of the vehicle was covered by a canvas that could be opened with a zipper. Its commercial results were better than those of the EBS convertible.

=== Super Van 5 ===
The Super Van 5 was a derivative of the Super 5 devised by the coachbuilding company Heuliez and presented in 1985. It is a longer Super 5 — 3,591 mm (141.4 in) in length – whose rear door is sliding, allowing greater accessibility to the interior of the vehicle. It lacks a boot, as two seats are placed in its place, totalling seven seats. Catalogs of the time advertised it as a model intended for the transport of passengers (taxi) or goods, since its seats can be folded. The fashion house Yves Saint Laurent acquired several Super Van 5s for transporting its products.

== Competition ==
=== World Rally Championship ===
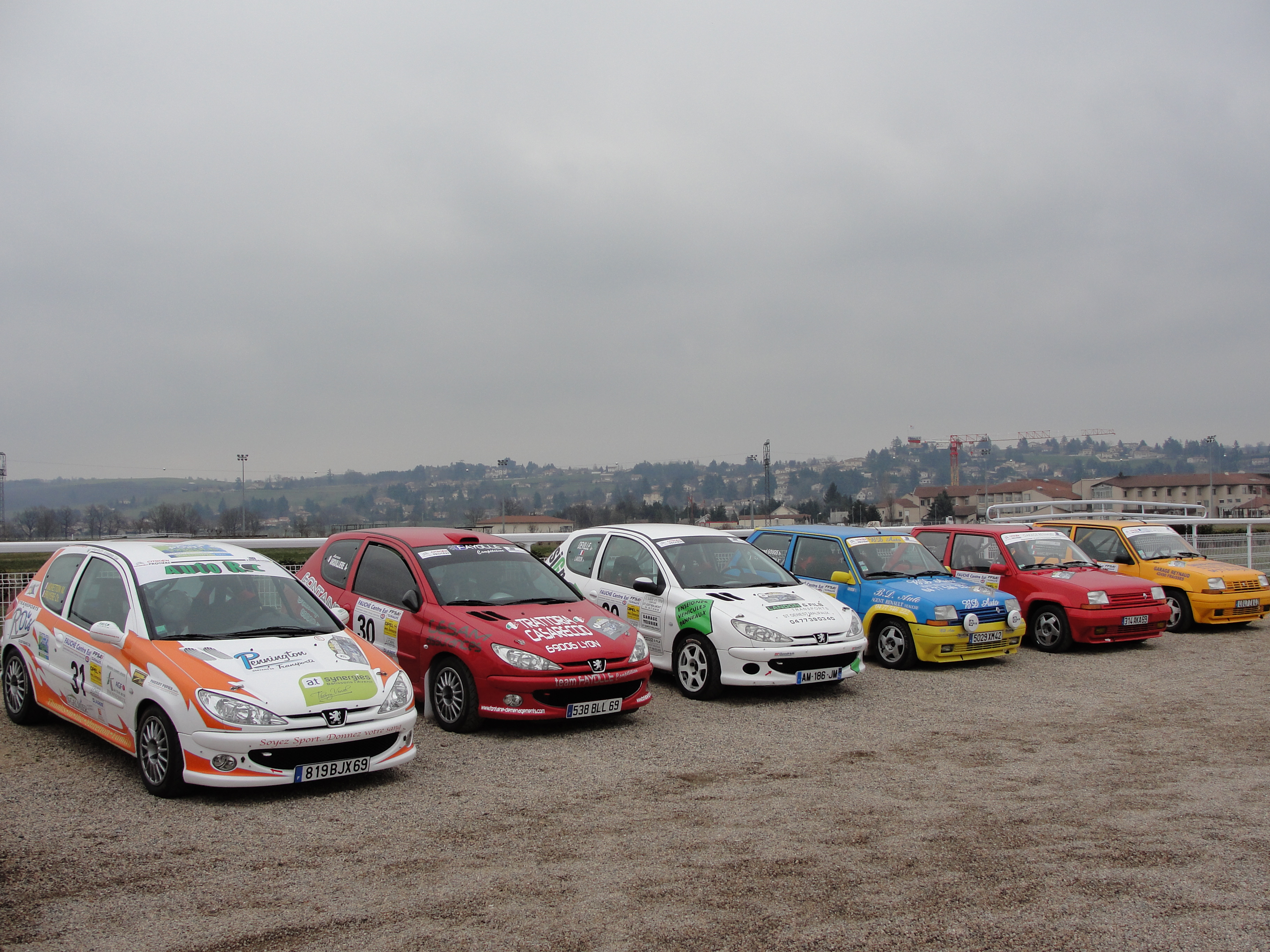
Three Peugeot 206s and three Renault Super 5 intended for competition.

Renault participated in the Fédération Internationale de l'Automobile (FIA) World Rally Championship with the GT Turbo version of the Super 5 between 1986 and 1990. The vehicle debuted at the 1986 Rallye Sanremo, with the Italian duo Livio Lupidi and Demetrio Davanzo as driver and co-driver respectively. They finished in tenth place, with a time of 6:36.16 and a difference of 1:04.41 from the Lancia Delta S4 of Markku Alén, winner of the event.

In 1987 the Super 5 did not participate in the championship, a season in which its place was taken by the Renault 11, but it returned to the championship in 1988. That year it ran in two races, Monte Carlo and Corsica. Driven by Richard Frau in the first and Alain Oreille in the second, it achieved tenth place in both rallies. In 1989, French driver Alain Oreille ran in four of the thirteen rounds of the championship, Monte Carlo, Corsica, Sanremo and Côte d'Ivoire. He finished tenth, eighth, ninth and first respectively. Côte d'Ivoire represented the first and only victory for the GT Turbo in the World Rally Championship, in addition to being the only one for a Group N vehicle in a world championship event. The following year he ran in four other rallies, Corsica, New Zealand, Argentina and Côte d'Ivoire. In Corsica, three Super 5 driven by Claude Balesi, Alain Oreille and Sylvain Polo participated, classified in seventh, eighth and tenth place respectively. In the other races, a single GT Turbo driven by Oreille ran, achieving tenth place in New Zealand and sixth in Argentina. It was again in Côte d'Ivoire where he obtained the best result; despite not repeating the previous year's victory, he managed to get onto the podium with a third place. It would be the last edition of the championship in which the Super 5 would participate, as in 1991 it was replaced by the Renault Clio.

It had more success in the World Rally Championship for Production Cars, a competition complementary to the World Rally Championship whose participation is limited to Group N vehicles. Alain Oreille obtained two consecutive victories in this championship (1989 and 1990) with a Super 5 GT Turbo.

=== European Rally Championship ===
Between 1985 and 1990, the Super 5 ran in the Rally Catalunya, a qualifying event for the European Rally Championship. In its first participation, driven by the Andorran Carles Santacreu, it finished in ninth place. The following year it repeated in the race, but this time with the Yugoslavian driver Branislav Küzmič, who obtained tenth place. It is worth noting that in this same rally a Renault 5 Maxi Turbo driven by Carlos Sainz participated, which managed to get onto the podium unlike its successor. In 1987, four Super 5 participated, driven by Branislav Küzmič, Josep Alcina, Gustavo Trelles and Francisco Ambudio, finishing sixth, seventh, eighth and ninth respectively.

In the following two editions, no GT Turbo would participate, but two returned in 1990. The Spanish drivers Enric Xargay and Josep Alcina obtained sixth and seventh positions respectively. It was the last participation of the Super 5 in the European Championship before the arrival of the Clio.

=== French Championship ===
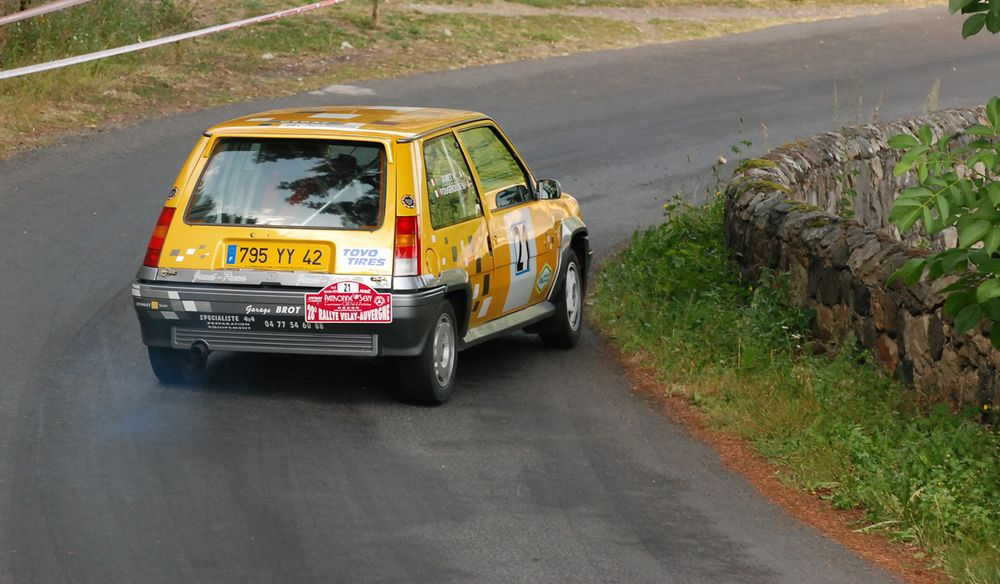
A Super 5 running a rally held in France.

Renault participated with its Super 5 in the French Rally Championship for four consecutive editions in the late 1980s. In 1987, driver Philippe Bugalski managed to qualify in fifth position with 71 points, 62 behind the Ford Sierra of Didier Auriol, winner of the edition. Bugalski ran in nine of the ten rounds and completed seven, as he retired in Mont Blanc and in Cévennes due to technical difficulties. In 1988, Alain Oreille took the wheel of the Super 5, leaving the Renault 11 with which he had participated in previous editions. He finished fifth again, but increased his score by two points compared to the previous year. He ran in three rallies, of which his best result was fourth place in the first stage. Oreille repeated in 1989 with the Super 5, a year in which he repeated fifth position with 64 points. He ran in all the championship races, but was only able to complete half. In the same edition, another Super 5 driven by Christian Gazaud participated, obtaining seventh place with 39 points.

Renault's hatchback bid farewell to the French championship in 1990, with the participation of two models driven by Jean Ragnotti and Sylvain Polo. The first finished fourth with 76 points, after running in all ten rounds and completing all except the Tour de Corse. The second finished seventh with 42 points, after competing in seven of the rallies.

=== Spanish Championship ===
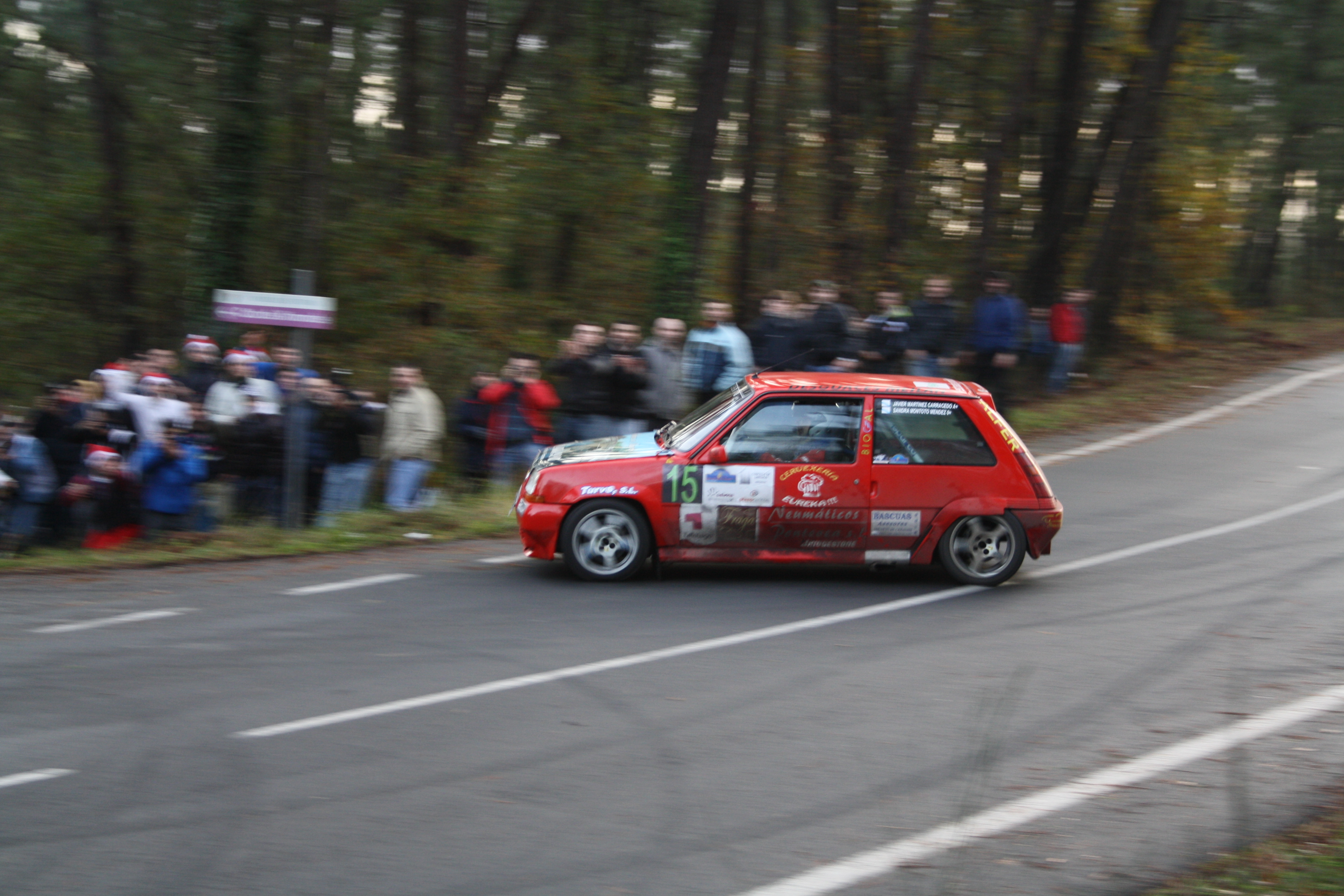
Renault Super 5 in the Galician Rally Championship.

In 1986, Jesús Puras obtained victory in the Copa de España with the Super 5, the first triumph and the vehicle's first participation in a Spanish competition. That same year, Puras ran in two races of the Spanish Rally Championship, Costa Brava and Costa Blanca. He repeated at the wheel of the Super 5 a year later; he ran in nine of the eleven rounds of the championship, although he had to retire from the last one, held in Madrid. In the overall classification, he finished fourth with 1176 points. Also in 1987, the Uruguayan Gustavo Trelles participated in eight of the races and finished sixth overall with 903 points. He also won the Spanish Group N Championship and the Renault Cup. He competed in the Spanish trophy until the 1990s, however, he did not achieve a notable position in the championship again. Driver Paco López finished sixteenth in the Rally Sierra Morena in 1989. The results of the Super 5, together with those of the Renault 5 Maxi Turbo and the Renault 11, contributed to Renault winning the Manufacturers' Championship in 1986, 1987 and 1988, as well as third place in 1989.

==== Regional competitions ====
In addition to the national trophy, several competitions are held at the regional level in Spain, in which the Super 5 participated with good results. The first time it competed in a rally of this nature was in 1986, in the Galician Rally Championship. With José Mora and Luis Moya as driver and co-driver respectively, it obtained first place. Two years later, in 1988, Alfonso Pavón regained the Galician title lost in 1987 against the Opel Manta of Carlos Piñeiro. It also participated in other championships in the north of the country, such as the Asturian Rally Championship, where driver Kiko Cima was three-time champion (1987, 1988 and 1990) or the Cantabrian Rally Championship, where Miguel Martínez Conde obtained in 1991 one of the last first places in official competitions of the Super 5. Also noteworthy is the participation of the Super 5 in the Andalusian Rally Championship, despite not obtaining any overall victory, it took third place in the 1987 and 1991 editions. At the same time, it is noteworthy that today one can see some Renault Super 5 in the classic section of this type of competition. They are generally driven by amateur and semi-professional drivers.

== Legacy ==
The Renault Super 5 has become one of the most popular cars of the 1980s as well as a benchmark of that decade. Proof of this are the numerous associations of admirers of the vehicle existing around the world and the opinion of many motorists. Furthermore, many people still drive a Super 5 daily, more than fifteen years after its production ceased. However, its relevance within the automotive world was not the same as that of the Renault 5. The causes that explain this phenomenon can be summarized in three factors, the first of which is found in the years of marketing. The Super 5 was only marketed during the second half of the 1980s, since from 1990 until its disappearance it only filled the gap between the Clio and the Twingo. In addition, advertising and marketing campaigns were already focused on these two models. In contrast, its predecessor remained for ten years as the only model in its line within the Renault range. The second reason is external to the French company; while in 1972 few brands included a model similar to the R5 in their range, the Super 5 appeared at a time when the European B-segment was booming and was present in the repertoire of most contemporary car manufacturers. Finally, it must be taken into account that the Renault 5 incorporated a whole series of new elements and represented a revolution for the sector – until then no other utility car had achieved such high sales and popularity figures – milestones that the Super 5, despite coming close, did not surpass.

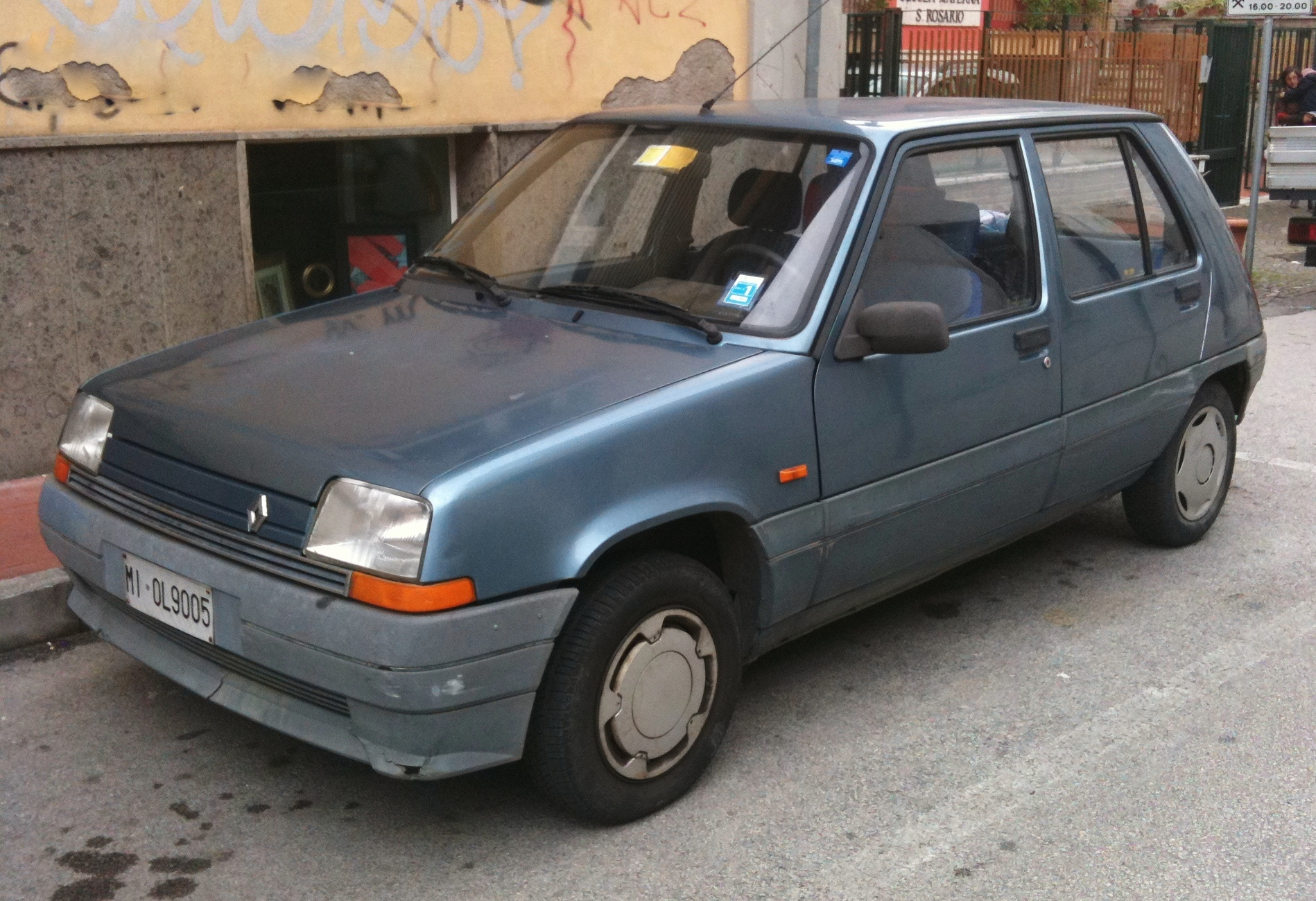
The Renault Super 5, besides being an icon of the 1980s, is present in multiple collections of scale model cars and has appeared in other media such as music, film, television or video games.

However, its lesser significance does not imply that it is a model overlooked by automotive historiography. In 1986, the Super 5 finished second in the election for Car of the Year in Spain, with 284 points. On that occasion, the winner was the SEAT Málaga, a vehicle that only surpassed the French utility car by thirteen points. In 2011, it ranked first in the "Coches Nostalgia" list, a ranking created based on the opinion of readers of the Spanish newspaper 20 minutos. Furthermore, it is in seventh position in the ranking made by the site materialracing.com, whose users gave it a score of 6.6 out of 10. Moreover, many companies dedicated to the production of scale model cars, both toys and collector's items, have included a miniature of the Super 5 among their products. Among the companies, mention can be made of Ixo, or Sun Star, among others. Among the collections, "Nuestros Queridos Coches Años 80" ("Our Beloved Cars of the 1980s") stands out, launched by Ediciones Altaya in 2006 and whose issue number ten included a 1:43 scale reproduction of a 1984 Renault Super 5 GTL accompanied by a dossier with information about the model. Along the same lines, reproductions intended for slot car racing were also manufactured. Most of these miniatures correspond to the different sports versions of the car, such as Oreille's GT Turbo.

The model has also been present in the world of music. On the cover of the album Here I am (1987), by the German group Dominoe, a Super 5 GT Turbo appeared. The Spanish singer Paloma San Basilio released in the mid-1980s an LP, which included nine singles, entitled Renault Super 5. However, its presence is not limited to titles and covers; in the music video for the song "Here she comes", performed by Bonnie Tyler in 1984, the Welsh singer can be seen driving a Super 5 for a large part of the video. It helped to increase the popularity of this Supercar from the '80s.

== See also ==
- Renault 4 (1961–1992)
- Renault 5 (1972–1985)
- Renault 6 (1968–1986)
- Renault 7 (1974–1984)
- Renault Clio (1990–present)
- Renault Twingo (1992–present)
- Renault Modus (2004–2012)

== Bibliography ==
- AA. VV. (1986). Manual de Taller de Renault 5 [Renault 5 Workshop Manual]. Vol. I. Madrid: Guía de Tasaciones.
- AA. VV. (1991a). Manual de Taller de Renault Supercinco [Renault Superfive Workshop Manual]. Madrid: Guía de Tasaciones.
- Legg, A. K. (1996). Renault 5 (1985–96): Service and Repair Manual. Haynes Publishing. ISBN 1-85960-099-9.
