= Billancourt, Somme =

Billancourt
- Commune
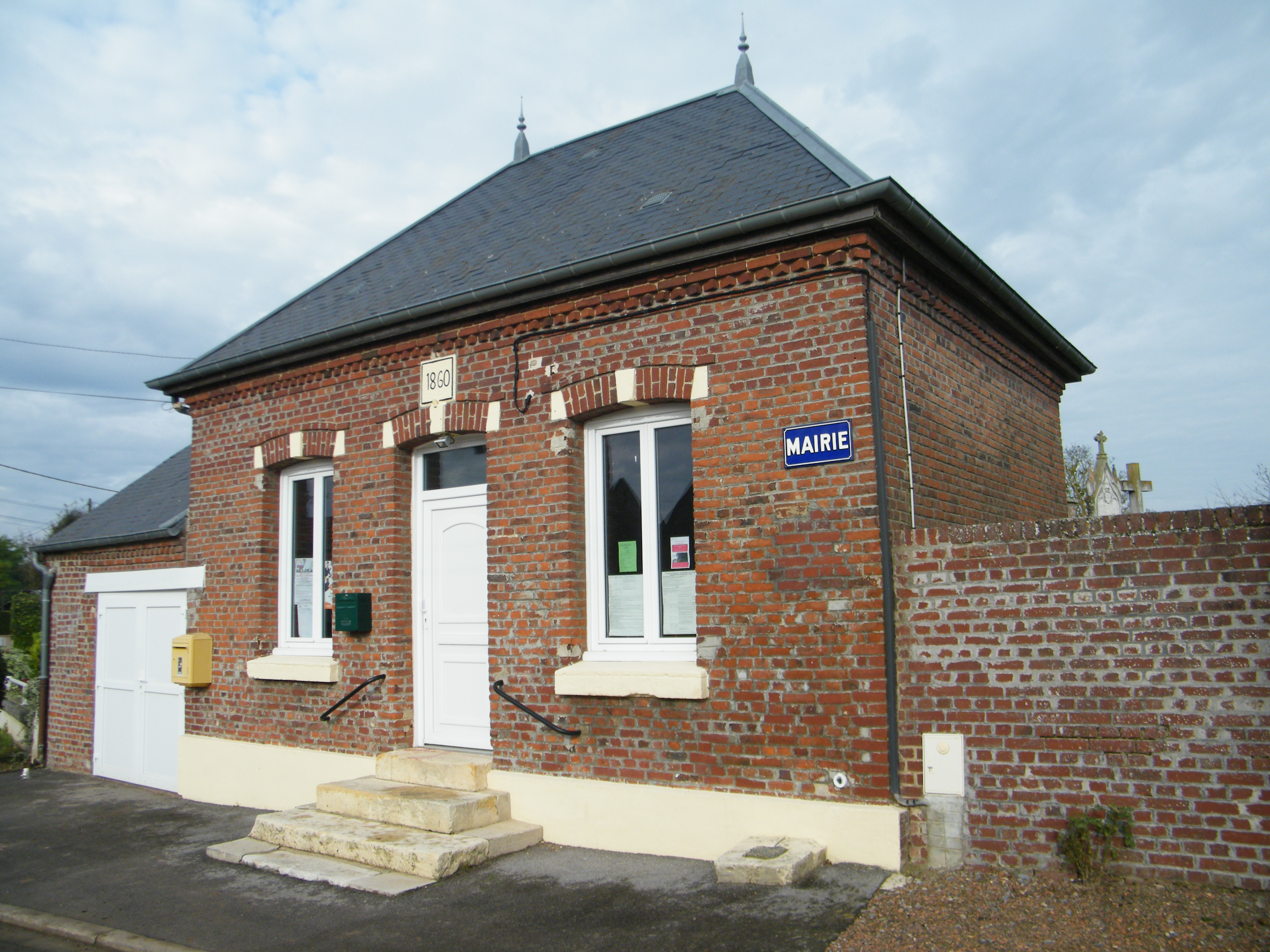
- The town hall in Billancourt
- Location of Billancourt
- Location within France Location within Hauts-de-France
- Coordinates: 49°44′13″N 2°53′39″E
- Country: France
- Region: Hauts-de-France
- Department: Somme
- Arrondissement: Péronne
- Canton: Ham
- Intercommunality: CC Est de la Somme

Government
  - Mayor (2020–2026): Christophe Desachy
- Area^{1}: 4.95 km^{2} (1.91 sq mi)
- Elevation: 88 m (289 ft)
- Highest elevation: 91 m (299 ft)
- Lowest elevation: 63 m (207 ft)
- Population (2023): 178
  - Density: 36.0/km^{2} (93.1/sq mi)
- Time zone: UTC+01:00 (CET)
  - Summer (DST): UTC+02:00 (CEST)
- INSEE/Postal code: 80105 /80190
- ^{1} French Land Register data, which excludes lakes, ponds, glaciers > 1 km^{2} (0.386 sq mi or 247 acres) and river estuaries.

Billancourt is a commune in the Somme department in northern France.

== See also ==
- Communes of the Somme department
