= Here Am I =

Here Am I may refer to:

- "Here Am I" (Bonnie Tyler song), 1978
- Here Am I (Bonnie Tyler album)
- Here Am I (Judith Durham album)
- "Here Am I" (Dragon song), 1989
