= Dominoe =

German rock band

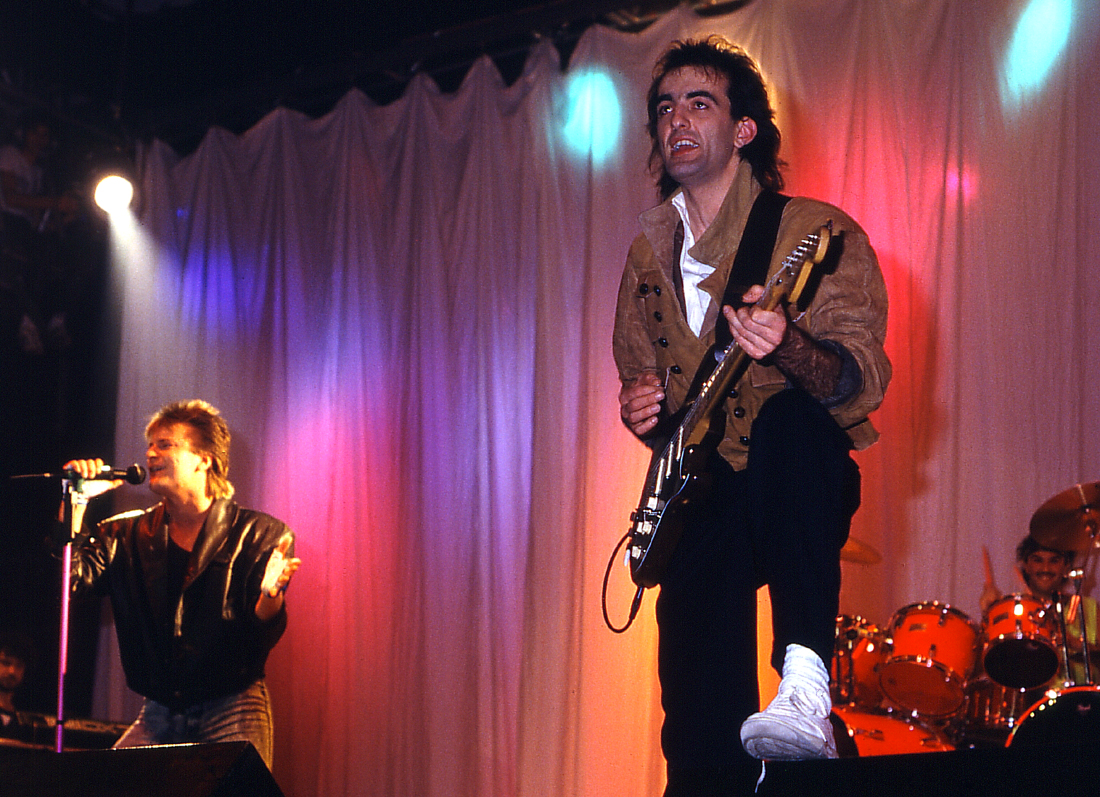

Background information
- Origin: Grafing bei München, Germany
- Genres: Rock
- Years active: 1987-1991, 2002-present
- Members: Jörg Sieber; Robert Papst
- Past members: Angie Buchzyk; Fred Neudert; Heinz (Rick) Schultz; Johnny Rohde; Markus Schiegl; Jane Bogaert; Chris Birawsky

Dominoe is a German rock band, founded in 1987 in Grafing bei München by guitarist Robert Papst (* 10. Dezember 1960 in Ebersberg) and singer Jörg Sieber (* 13. Juli 1961 in Ulm). The band rose to fame in early 1988 with the track Here I Am, which was used in a commercial by French automobile manufacturer Renault.

== History ==
The members of Dominoe had gained their first musical experiences in various student bands in the vicinity of Munich and had been partly acquainted with each other for more than ten years. Having set up their own recording studio, the musicians made attempts in the mid-1980's with band names like Flick of the Wrist and Radius, before the band Dominoe was proclaimed in 1987 with Jörg Sieber as their new lead singer. Their debut single immediately became a top hit. Thanks to the use of the song "Here I Am" in a TV commercial advertising the car model Renault 5, it entered the German charts in early 1988, peaking at No. 4 in February, and stayed in the charts for three months. During this time, the Bavarian rock band were on their way in various European countries and even appeared on French television.

Dominoe were not able to carry their initial success along to the follow-up single, "Let’s Talk About Life", but nonetheless the single peaked at No. 53 in June 1988. Their third single, "Family Man," from their debut album Keep in Touch, was released in August 1988.

In 1989, Robert Papst left the band as a musician and became Dominoe's producer. In his place, guitarist Markus Schiegl stepped in. The keyboardist and background singer Angie Buchzyk tried her hand at being a solo artist under the name Angie Layne, also produced by Papst.

The second album, The Key (1990), which Papst co-produced with Harold Faltermeyer, only sold moderately. After an accompanying tour in the fall of 1990, the musicians again went separate ways.

In 1994, Jörg Sieber released a solo album under the pseudonym Jay Seever. The single "That’s What You're Looking For" was the title song for a Hanuta-commercial. Once again, the project was produced by Robert Papst.

It wasn't until 2002 that Papst and Sieber decided to record a third Dominoe album entitled No Silence… No Lambs, which they recorded together with new musicians such as the singer Jane Bogaert.

The fourth album, The Story Is Far from Told, was released in 2008 and was accompanied by some television appearances such as ZDF-Fernsehgarten, Sat.1 Hit-Giganten.

Their fifth album, Naked but Dressed, which was released in 2012, featured guest musicians for the first time, including the singer Jimi Jamison from the group Survivor).

In November 2018, the sixth album, The Lost Radio Show, was released. It consists of recordings that Dominoe played for a British radio show in 2008. Parts of these live recordings were lost due to a hard drive crash, meaning that the planned radio broadcast could not be transmitted. The incomplete parts that were preserved were archived. By chance, Robert Pope rediscovered these excerpts at the beginning of 2018. Most of the pieces recorded in 2008 were used for the album, only the parts that were actually lost had to be re-recorded. Former band members and long-time musician friends of Papst helped to supplement and complete the recordings. Pope managed to capture the atmosphere of the original session with this release. The positive response from the music scene to Dominoe's first release in six years was accompanied by radio and TV interviews.

In June 2021, Dominoe appeared again in a new version of the song "Comin' Home", which was produced by Robert Papst in 2012. In "Comin' Home", Jörg Sieber sings a duet with Jamison, who died in 2014.

In early 2022, a new edition of their 2002 CD No Silence... No Lambs was released, revised and including new material.

== Discography ==
=== Albums ===
(Source:)

- 1988: Keep in Touch
- 1990: The Key
- 1994: No Nore Money – Jay Seever
- 2002: No Silence… No Lambs
- 2008: The Story Is Far from Told
- 2012: Naked but Dressed
- 2018: The Lost Radio Show
- 2022: No Silence No Lambs – Director’s Cut

=== Singles ===
- 1987: Here I Am
- 1988: Let’s Talk About Life
- 1988: Family Man
- 1990: Angel Don't Cry
- 1990: Keep the Fire Burnin’
- 1993: Secret Love – Jay Seever
- 1994: That’s What You're Looking For – Jay Seever
- 1994: Heaven Is for Heroes – Jay Seever
- 2002: Here I Am 2002
- 2008: Irresistible
- 2009: Yesterday Was Yesterday
- 2012: What Happens
- 2012: Naked feat. Larry Hoppen
- 2021: Comin' Home feat. Jimi Jamison (Stewart Sullivan Mix)
- 2022: No Way Out
