= Izuogu Z-600 =

Overview
- Production: 1997 (prototype only)
- Assembly: Nigeria
- Designer: Ezekiel Izuogu

The Izuogu Z-600 prototype was the first indigenous Nigerian car, and the first automobile of indigenous all-African technology. It was the brainchild of engineer Ezekiel Izuogu. Launched in 1997, the car caused a stir in the Nigerian media, and was touted by the then Nigerian chief of staff General Oladipo Diya.

== Design and specification ==
The prototype was equipped with a self made 1.8L four cylinder engine that got 18mpg and allowed the car to achieve a top speed of 140 km/h (86 mph). Front Wheel Drive (FWD) was chosen over Rear Wheel Drive (RWD) because a transmission tunnel, which RWD would require, would be more expensive to fabricate. 90% of the car's components were made locally.

The design of the car was very utilitarian resembling a Renault 4 with its upright stance and a front end that vaguely resembles the locally assembled Peugeot 504.

To be priced at $2000 it would have been the cheapest car in the world. Clever features like a door bell used in place of a horn ensure it achieves its low price target. Mass production was planned under Izuogu motors located in Naze, Imo state, but too many financial and political hurdles prevented the car from proceeding past the prototype stage.

== Current progress ==
In 2005 interest from other African countries arose about the Z-600 and Dr. Izuogu was invited to South Africa to give a speech on science and technology. The South African government showed keen interest in the car and wanted Izuogu to build it in South Africa.

Optimism surrounded the car until March 11, 2006, when no fewer than 12 heavily armed men raided the factory of Izuogu Motors in Naze taking with them the molds for the engine blocks and crank shaft, mudguards, the design history notebook of Z-600, the design file; Z-MASS (containing the design history for mass production of the Z-600 car) and other components. This was a big setback for the project. Since then not much is known on the status of the car.
