= HAN University of Applied Sciences =

University in the Netherlands

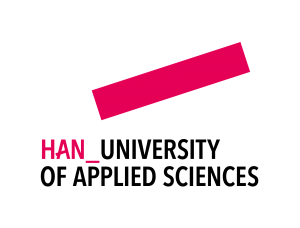
- Motto: Open up new horizons
- Type: University of Applied Sciences
- Established: February 1, 1996
- President: Rob Verhofstad
- Administrative staff: 4,400+
- Students: 35,000
- Location: Arnhem and Nijmegen, Netherlands
- Campus: Urban
- Colours: Magenta
- Affiliations: Erasmus, UASNL, SURF
- Website: www.hanuniversity.com

The HAN University of Applied Sciences, mostly referred to as HAN, is one of the largest universities of applied sciences in the Netherlands. It offers bachelor's and master's degree programs to over 35,000 students. HAN is a knowledge institute for higher education and research in the Dutch province of Gelderland, with campuses in Arnhem and Nijmegen.

== History ==
In the 1980s there were many small universities of applied sciences in the Netherlands. The government at the time believed this was inefficient, both in terms of the financing and organizing of education. In 1983 the government pushed smaller universities of applied sciences to merge. The Netherlands Association of Universities of Applied Sciences agreed, and gradually more and more universities of applied sciences in Arnhem and Nijmegen merged.

On 1 February 1996, the HAN conglomerate was finally established and it became a large, broad-based educational institution. Since then the number of students has grown while costs have been reduced, entirely in line with the goals of the government and the Association of Universities of Applied Sciences.

In June 2019, HAN changed its name. Formerly known under its Dutch name Hogeschool van Arnhem en Nijmegen, it now bears the name HAN University of Applied Sciences. In the process, HAN also changed its logo and corporate identity.

== Facts and figures ==
(from 2023)

- 34,930 students
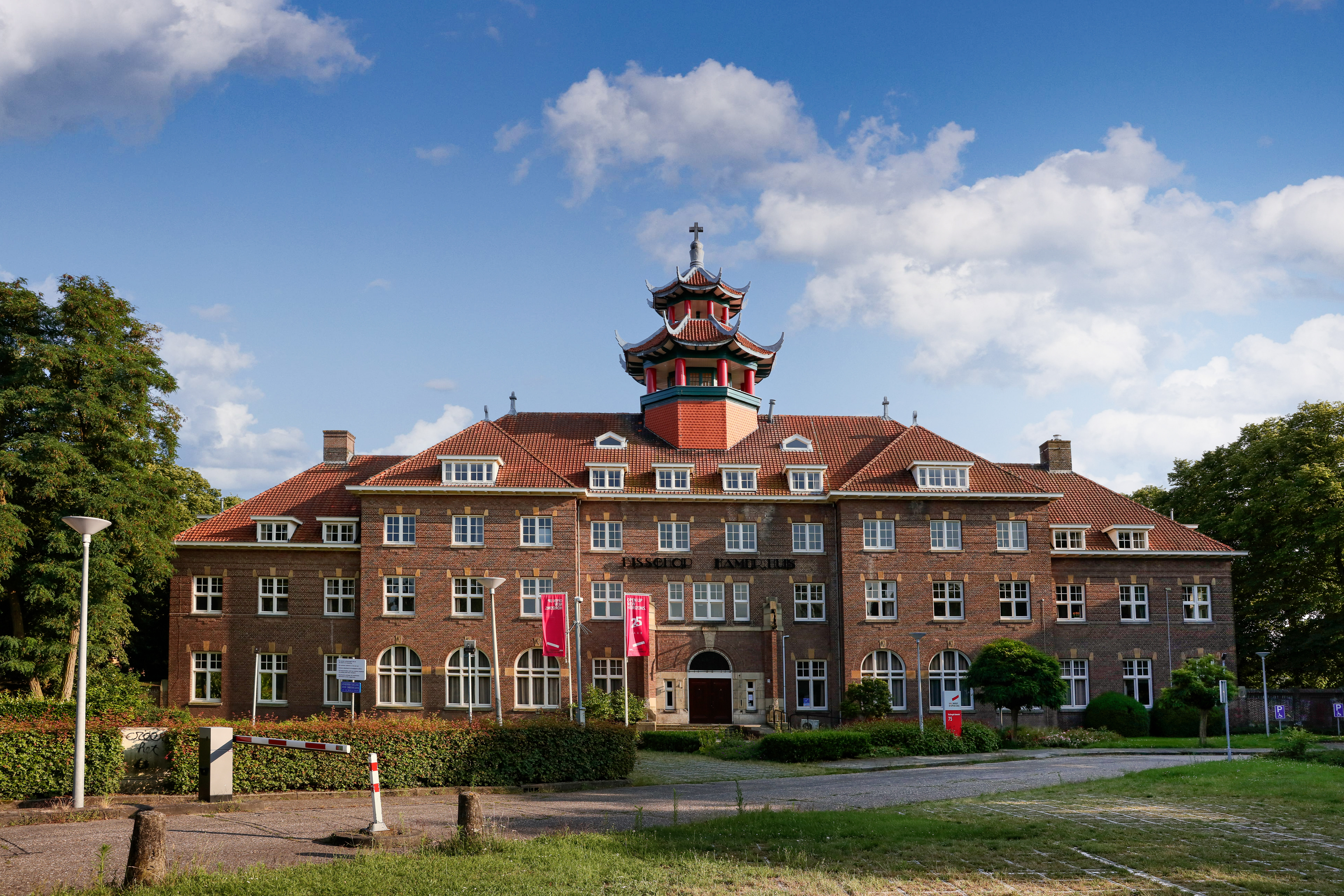
  Bisschop Hamerhuis: Monumental HAN Campus Building in Nijmegen built in 1923
- 31,933 bachelor students
- 1,431 associate degree students
- 1,566 master students
- 10,151 new student intake (2023)
- 68% percentage satisfied students
- 50 research centers
- 331 incoming exchange students
- 493 outgoing exchange students

== Organization ==
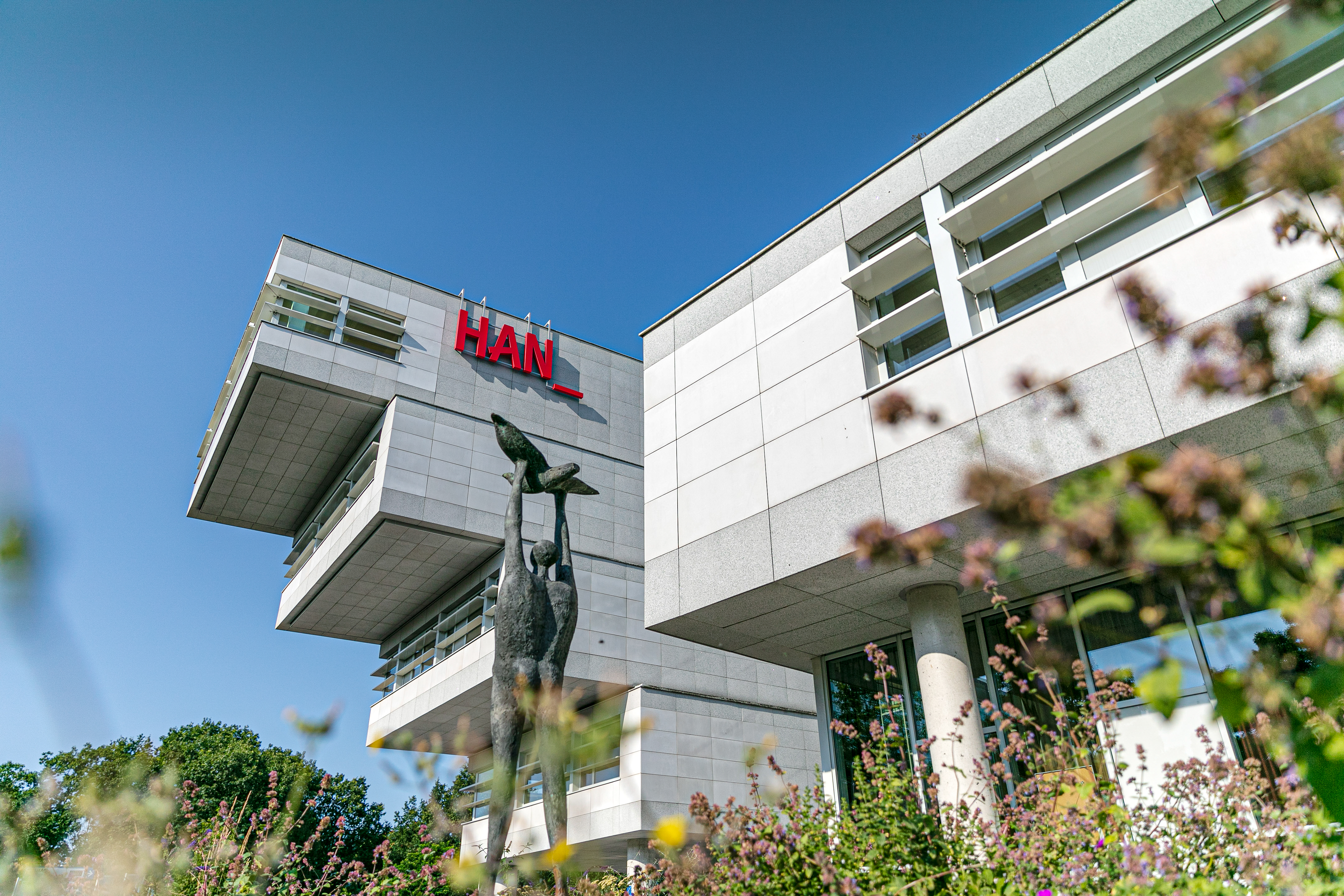
HAN School of Education, the most sustainable academic building in the Netherlands.

There are 13 HAN schools:

- HAN International School of Business
- School of Built Environment
- School of Education
- School of Engineering and Automotive
- School of Finance and Law
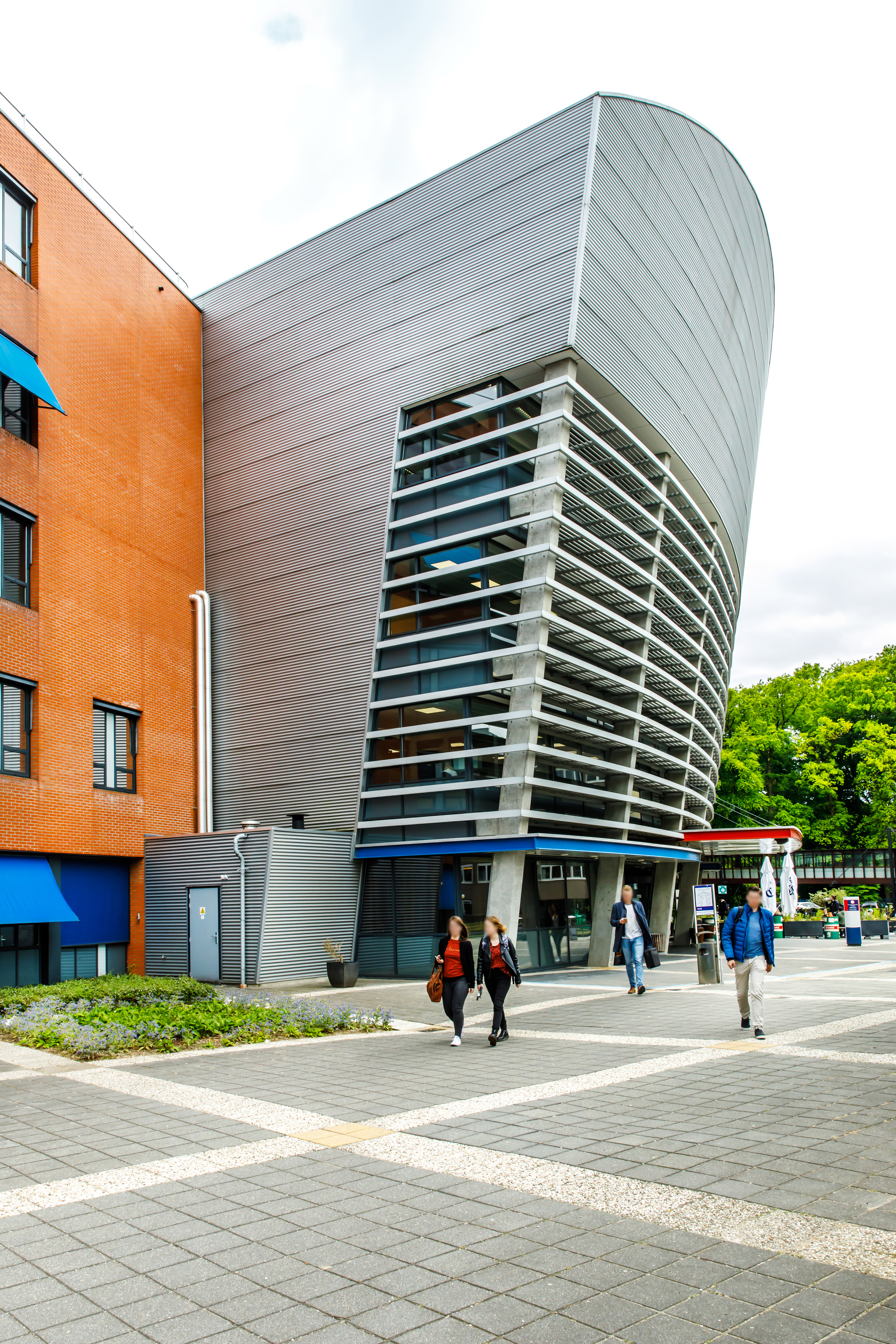
  A central building on HAN Arnhem campus, home to the International School of Business, the School of Finance, and the International Office.
- School of Health Studies
- School of IT and Media Design
- School of Social Studies
- School of Organisation and Development
- School of Allied Health
- International School of Business
- School of Sport and Exercise
- School of Applied Biosciences and Chemistry

The degree programs, research and consultancy are organized by these schools. All supporting services are incorporated in the Services Department, divided over seven Service Units.

=== Management layers ===
The organization has three management layers:

- The university of applied sciences under management of the Executive Board
- The schools under management of the Executive Board / the Services Department under the management of a director
- The degree programs under management of the schools / the Service Units under management of a head

=== Participation ===
HAN has a structurer in place for staff and student participation and representation in decision-making. This involves:

- A central participation council. This council is a member of the Intercity Student Consultation and the Dutch Association of Participation Councils for Universities of Applied Sciences.
- Fourteen school councils and one Services Department council. These councils also receive support from the Student Consultation on Participation.
- Degree committees for each of the degree programs. The degree committee deals with the operational policy of a degree program and supports the program manager in this.
- The class representatives form the basis for the participation structure.

In 2010-2011, HAN decided not to split the participation council up into a separate student council and a works council, and so instead of following the Works Councils Act they adhere to the Higher Education and Research Act (Wet op Hoger en Wetenschappelijk Onderwijs). At the same time, however, it was decided that each employee participation body may determine its own rules of procedure about whether the student and employee sections within that council convene separately or jointly.

=== Internationalization ===
Internationalization is a key pillar of HAN University of Applied Sciences, aiming to enrich education and research while preparing students for a globally connected workforce. The university facilitates international experiences through student exchange programs, global partnerships, and curriculum integration. It also supports international students through dedicated services and events.

==== Support for international students ====
HAN University offers various support services to help international students transition smoothly into academic life in the Netherlands. The International Office provides guidance on visas, housing, scholarships, and integration. Additionally, the university organizes orientation programs, which include events and workshops designed to help students adapt to Dutch culture and academic life. To foster a sense of community, HAN hosts social and networking events that provide opportunities for international and local students to connect and engage in intercultural exchange. The university also offers language support through courses such as Social Dutch, helping students develop language skills necessary for daily life and work in the Netherlands.

==== Erasmus+ and exchange programs ====
HAN University actively participates in Erasmus+, the European Union’s exchange program for education, training, and youth. Through this program, both students and faculty can engage in various mobility activities. HAN students have the opportunity to study or intern abroad at one of over 325 partner universities worldwide, including Münster University of Applied Sciences (Germany), Dundee University (Scotland), and Artevelde University of Applied Sciences (Belgium). Likewise, students from HAN's partner universities can study at HAN for a semester or academic year. In addition, innovative formats such as Blended Intensive Programs (BIPs) allow students to combine virtual and physical mobility experiences. The Erasmus+ program also supports faculty exchange and research collaboration, further strengthening international partnerships.

==== UP University Consortium ====
HAN is a member of the UP University Consortium, a network of European institutions working together to shape the future of education, work, and society. The consortium focuses on creating an innovation hub that brings together students, researchers, and industry professionals to solve regional and global challenges. It also works on developing joint study programs, offering collaborative degrees across multiple universities. The project aims to address skills gaps by providing flexible education pathways, especially for working professionals and disadvantaged students. Additionally, the consortium promotes regional development, following the concept of "the region as a campus" to ensure that research and innovation benefit local communities.

== Education ==
=== Bachelor programs ===
The school offers around 64 bachelor programs in the following fields:

- Business, Management and Law
- Engineering and Life Sciences
- Information Technology, Media and Communication
- Education and Training
- Behavior and Social Studies
- Health
- Sport and Exercise

There are also 10 English-taught bachelor programs for international students:

- Automotive Engineering
- Chemistry
- Communication
- Electrical and Electronic Engineering
- Embedded Systems Engineering
- International Business
- International Social Work
- Life Sciences
- Mechanical Engineering
- Molecular Biosciences joint degree with The University of Dundee (new in 2024)

=== Master programs ===
HAN offers 18 master programs in the following fields:

- Business, Management and Law
- Engineering and Life Sciences
- Information Technology, Media and Communication
- Education and Training
- Behavior and Social Studies
- Health

=== Post-graduate degrees, professional courses and consultancy service ===
HAN offers over 150 practice-based post-graduate programs and courses for professionals. It also offers internships, projects and graduation assignments.

=== Masterclasses ===
Three times a year HAN also organizes Creative Masterclasses. These are lectures, masterclasses and seminars with international speakers on the theme of economy and creativity.

== Research ==
HAN supports companies and institutions with innovation through its research groups in various fields. They conduct applied research that addresses urgent societal and technological challenges, in close collaboration with the professional field. The research is aligned with the United Nations Sustainable Development Goals (SDGs), with a particular focus on reducing CO_{2} emissions, decreasing health disparities, and advancing innovation through digital technology.

HAN University of Applied Sciences research infrastructure includes:

- 50 Research centers
- 7 Centres of Expertise, including HAN BioCentre and others
- PhD research, conducted in collaboration with research universities

=== HAN BioCentre ===
HAN BioCentre is a multidisciplinary research institute that specializes in applied biotechnology and life sciences. The centre collaborates closely with industry partners and supports innovation by conducting research focused on sustainability, circular economy, and biobased solutions. It serves as a platform where students, researchers, and businesses work together to develop practical applications for emerging technologies. One of the key achievements is the development of the microbial oil from organic waste. This innovative research utilized a yeast strain capable of converting vegetable waste into biobased oils. These oils have potential applications in industries such as coatings and lubricants, providing an alternative to fossil-based oils and supporting the transition towards a more sustainable circular economy. The centre also collaborates with Looop on valorizing residual streams from the food and fermentation industries, contributing to sustainable solutions in biorefining.

=== SIBR ===
The Center of International Business Research (CIBR) at HAN University of Applied Sciences focuses on facilitating organizations, leaders, and educators in addressing pressing local and global challenges, fostering a transition toward sustainable change. One of its notable publications is Leading Sustainability Transitions: An International Business Perspective (2024), which provides insights into how businesses can successfully integrate sustainability into their strategies.

=== Societal Impact Through Applied Research ===
HAN researchers are also developing innovative tools that directly address societal needs. A prime example is Design Your Life, a toolkit created in co-creation with young adults on the autism spectrum. Led by professor Maurice Magnée, the toolkit empowers users to design personal solutions to everyday challenges through structured activities and customizable design templates. The project was awarded first place in the RAAK Award 2024, which recognizes outstanding practice-based research by universities of applied sciences in the Netherlands. The €25,000 prize is being used to support broader implementation of the toolkit.

=== Digital accessibility and NGI collaboration ===
HAN is also a key contributor to the European Commission's Next Generation Internet (NGI) initiative, which aims to develop a more open, secure, and inclusive internet. The university's research group on Inclusive Digital Design & Engineering plays a central role in this effort. Recognized as a national competence center for digital accessibility, the group brings deep expertise in accessibility auditing and contributes to the development of open technologies that align with European values.

== Student projects ==
=== HAN Solarboat team ===
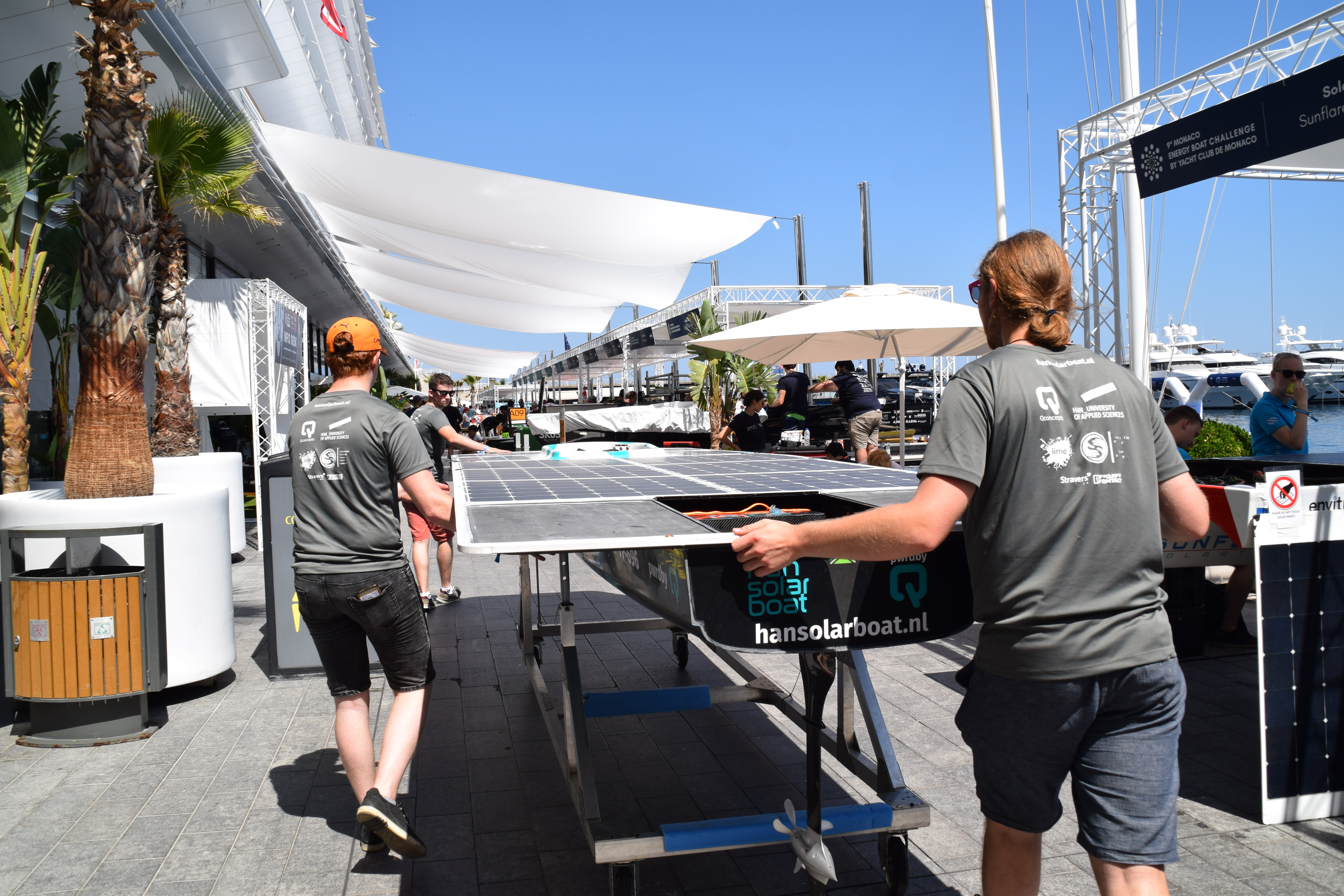
HAN Student Solar Boat team during the competition in Monaco 2022

The HAN Solarboat Team, founded in 2013, is a student-led project, focused on designing and racing solar-powered boats. The team consists of students from various disciplines, including mechanical engineering, embedded systems engineering, electrical engineering, and industrial design. Collaborating with professionals from Qconcepts Design & Engineering, they work on sustainable maritime innovations, optimizing energy efficiency and hydrodynamics while gaining hands-on engineering experience.

The team actively participates in national and international competitions, such as the Monaco Energy Boat Challenge. In the 2023 racing season, they secured second place overall, achieving silver in both the Endurance and Slalom categories.

=== HAN Formula Student team ===
HFS was established in May 2015 under the guidance of HAN University of Applied Sciences. It is a motorsport team consisting of 22 automotive engineering students from nine different countries, dedicated to designing, building, and racing high-performance vehicles in international Formula Student competitions. The HAN Formula Student Team is registered to compete in the 2025 Formula Student Netherlands event, scheduled for July, at the TT Circuit in Assen. The team aims to unveil their new electric race car during this event.

=== HAN Automotive Rally Team (HART) ===
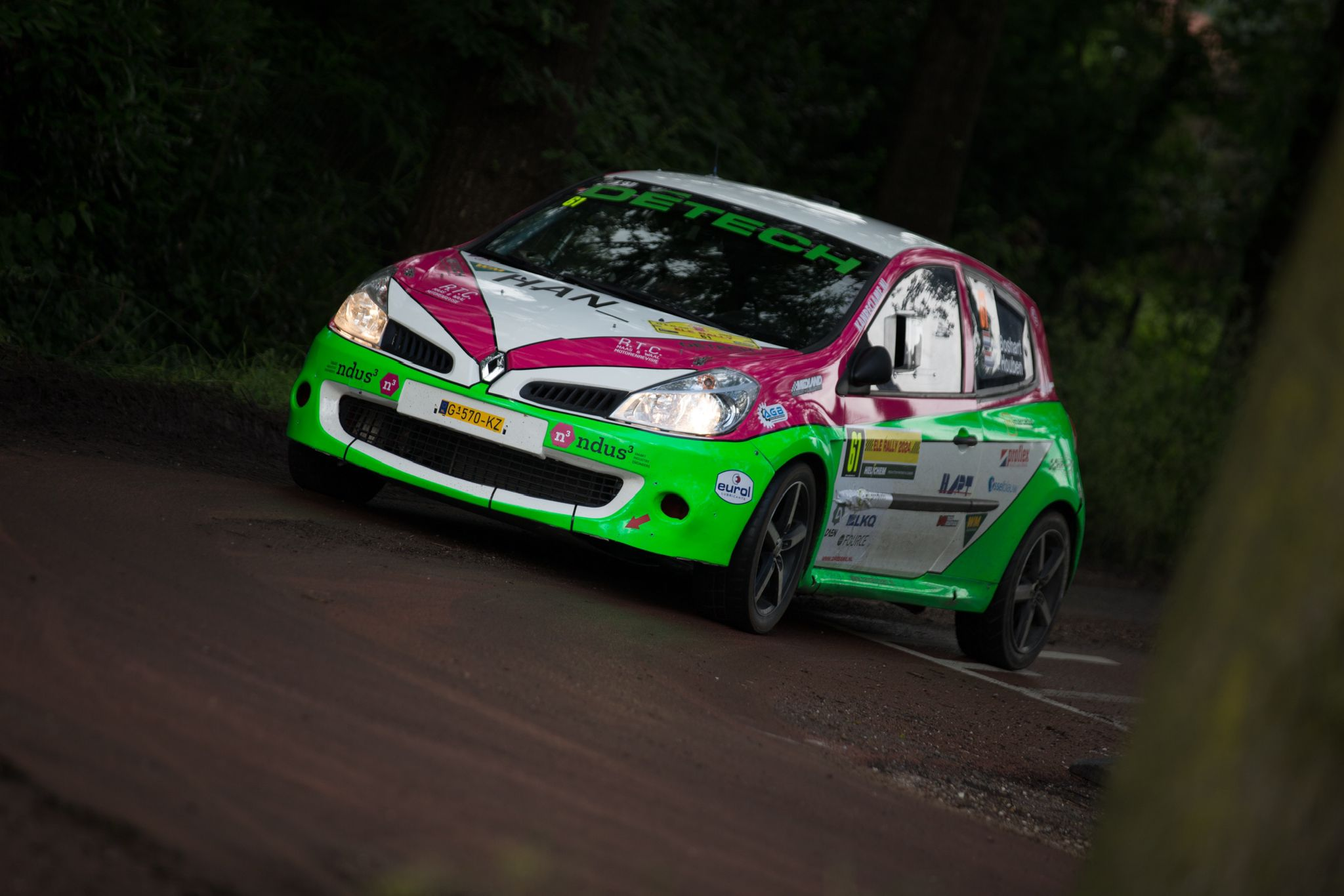
HART Renault Clio competing at ELE Rally 2024

HART is a multidisciplinary group united by a shared passion for motorsport and innovation. Composed exclusively of HAN students, the team is dedicated to maintaining, enhancing, and competing with a rally car in official the Dutch rally championship and is the only student rally team. In 2019, HART achieved a significant milestone by becoming the Overall Dutch Short Rally Champion during the Twente Short Rally. HART operates as a collaborative unit where members engage in various roles, including management, vehicle maintenance, sponsorship acquisition, and driving. This hands-on approach allows students to apply their academic knowledge to real-world motorsport scenarios. HART aims to elevate the rally sport in the Netherlands by fully committing to the use of bio-ethanol (E85) as fuel, which is not yet a common choice within the Netherlands. This shift not only reduces the team's carbon footprint but also promotes the adoption of renewable energy sources in motorsport, setting an example for a more sustainable future in the racing industry.

=== HAN4L Rally team ===
The HAN4L is a student team of international automotive engineering students from HAN University of Applied Sciences in the Netherlands, dedicated to participating in the 4L Trophy. It is an annual charity rally spanning France, Spain, and Morocco. The team competes using the Renault 4, a classic vehicle adapted for the challenging desert terrain. Their mission extends beyond racing, as the event focuses on delivering educational and humanitarian aid to children in Morocco. Through this initiative, HAN4L Team combines automotive engineering, teamwork, and social responsibility, providing students with hands-on experience in vehicle preparation and international rally logistics.

=== Pedal Towards Sustainability ===
It is a student project, developed by three Industrial Design Engineering students in collaboration with the Mother Earth Foundation. The initiative addresses waste management issues in the Philippines by designing a zero-waste cargo bike for local waste collectors. Made from durable materials and featuring a modular design, the bike is user-friendly and ideal for narrow streets. The project is open-source, enabling global adaptation. Pedal Towards Sustainability was a finalist in the "De Innovatiefste Student van Nederland 2024" award.

== Campus ==
HAN University of Applied Sciences has two main campuses, located in Nijmegen and Arnhem. Both campuses offer lecture halls, seminar rooms, and specialized laboratories that support practical education and applied research. Students have access to multimedia centers with academic resources, quiet study areas, and group workspaces designed for collaborative projects.

Each campus also features multiple dining options, including cafeterias, coffee corners, and vending machines, catering to a variety of dietary needs. As part of HAN’s sustainability efforts, the university is a single-use plastic-free zone, meaning disposable cups and plastic cutlery are not provided. Instead, students and staff use the Billy Cup system, a reusable deposit-based cup available at campus cafés.

=== Arnhem ===
HAN campus in Arnhem primarily serves students in business, engineering, and social sciences. The Silentium meditation room, located at Ruitenberglaan 31, provides a dedicated space for personal reflection, prayer, or meditation. For social and recreational activities, Lokaal 99 serves as a central meeting spot, hosting student events such as music nights and pub quizzes.

=== Nijmegen ===
The Nijmegen campus is located near Nijmegen Heyendaal railway station and serves students in disciplines such as health, social studies, and education. The campus buildings are primarily situated along Kapittelweg and Laan van Scheut. The inner courtyard, situated between campus buildings, offers an open-air environment for informal meetings, group work, and relaxation between classes.

== Notable HAN alumni ==
- Xiomara Maduro, Minister of Finance and Culture in Aruba
- Elmar Vlottes, Dutch politician, Member of the House of Representatives
- Sanne Wevers, Gymnast, Olympic champion 2016
- Bella Rwigamba, Chief Digital Officer at the Ministry of Education in Rwanda
- Bo Kramer, Para-wheelchair athlete, Paralympics champion 2024
- Wesley Vissers, IFBB Bodybuilder
- Kimberley Bos, Skeleton racer
- Henk Leenders, Dutch politician
- Kimberly Kalee, Track cyclist
- Arijan van Bavel, Dutch actor & entertainer
- Santiago Palacios, Mexican Footballer
- Tom Homburg, Bonaire Footballer
- Ties van der Lecq, Badminton player

== See also ==
- Radboud University Nijmegen
