= Santiago Palacios =

French-Mexican footballer (born 1991)

Personal information
- Full name: Santiago Fabio Palacios-Macedo George
- Date of birth: 21 April 1991 (age 35)
- Place of birth: Cuernavaca, Mexico
- Height: 1.85 m (6 ft 1 in)
- Position: Midfielder

Youth career
- ADF Cuernavaca
- Ajax Jiutepec
- UNAM

Senior career*
Years	Team	Apps	(Gls)
2011–2015	De Treffers	98	(50)
2015–2016	Roda JC	0	(0)
2015–2016	→ MVV Maastricht (loan)	31	(13)
2016–2018	UNAM	9	(1)
2017	→ Atlético San Luis (loan)	5	(0)
2018	Unión Adarve	0	(0)
2018–2019	San Agustín	28	(9)
2019–2021	Pozuelo de Alarcón	19	(8)
2021–2022	Las Rozas	23	(3)
- * Club domestic league appearances and goals as of 15 January 2020

Santiago Fabio Palacios-Macedo George (born 21 April 1991) is a Mexican footballer who plays as a midfielder for Spanish Tercera División club Pozuelo de Alarcón. He is of French descent.

== Career ==
Palacios played in the youth for hometown club AF Cuernavaca and made his debut in 2008 with the Mexican third-tier club Ajax Jiutepec. He then played for a year in the under-20 team of UNAM.

In 2011, he left for the Netherlands through Wim Zwitserloot, a Dutch colleague of his father, to play for lower-league side De Treffers and to study International Business and Management Studies at the HAN University of Applied Sciences. In the 2014–15 season he became the top goalscorer of the Topklasse Sunday with 27 goals. This earned him a transfer to Roda JC Kerkrade in June 2015. He signed a contract until mid-2017, with an option for another year.

The club then sent him on a season-long loan to MVV Maastricht during the 2015–16 season. He made his professional debut on 28 August 2015 in the match against FC Eindhoven. Palacios came on as a substitute for Prince Rajcomar 30 minutes before the final whistle. On 10 August 2016, he was released by Roda JC. He then returned to his native Mexico to continue his career there.

Palacios then signed with his former club UNAM, competing in the Liga MX. From July to December 2017, Palacios played on loan at Atlético San Luis, which played in the second-tier Ascenso MX.

In May 2018, Palacios signed with the Spanish club AD Unión Adarve, which played in the Segunda División B. In the summer transfer window, however, trainer Víctor Cea and his technical staff moved to Cultural Leonesa, after which the new technical staff indicated that Palacios would have to find a new club, and he was subsequently released. Afterwards he played in the Tercera División for the Madrid amateur clubs San Agustín del Guadalix and Pozuelo de Alarcón and went to study sport management at the European University of Madrid.

== Personal life ==
Palacios has a bachelor's degree in International Business and Management Studies at the HAN University of Applied Sciences of Arnhem and speaks fluently Spanish, French, English and Dutch. He has also studied sport management at the European University of Madrid.
