= Elmar Vlottes =

Dutch politician (born 1989)

Member of the House of Representatives
- Incumbent
- Assumed office 6 December 2023

Member of the Provincial Council of Gelderland
- In office 2017–2023

Personal details
- Born: 3 August 1989 (age 37) Apeldoorn, Netherlands
- Party: PVV
- Other political affiliations: Pim Fortuyn List (until 2008)
- Education: HAN University of Applied Sciences; Radboud University
- Occupation: Politician

E. (Elmar) Vlottes (born 3 August 1989) is a Dutch politician of the Party for Freedom who has been a Member of the House of Representatives since 2023.

== Biography ==
Vlottes was born in Apeldoorn in 1989. He studied for a HBO diploma at the HAN University of Applied Sciences followed by a degree in Dutch law at Radboud University before working as a programmer for an electronics company.

He has described assassinated Dutch politician Pim Fortuyn as motivating his interest in politics before he began working as an intern for the PVV in 2008 as a legal advisor. In 2017 he was elected to the Provincial Council of Gelderland and also worked as a policy officer for the PVV's faction in the House of Representatives. In the 2023 Dutch general election, he was elected to the House of Representatives, and he became the PVV's spokesperson for taxation and benefits.

=== House committee assignments ===
- Public Expenditure committee
- Committee for Finance
- Delegation to the Interparliamentary Committee on the Dutch Language Union

== Electoral history ==
Electoral history of Elmar Vlottes
Year	Body	Party	Pos.	Votes	Result		Ref.
Year	Body	Party	Pos.	Votes	Party seats	Individual	Ref.
2017	House of Representatives	Party for Freedom	30	381	20	Lost	
2019	Senate	Party for Freedom	12	0	5	Lost	
2021	House of Representatives	Party for Freedom	34	263	17	Lost	
2023	House of Representatives	Party for Freedom	27	706	37	Won	
2025	House of Representatives	Party for Freedom	13	582	26	Won	
