= Mooi! Weer De Leeuw =

Dutch television show

Mooi! Weer De Leeuw (Dutch: "Great! De Leeuw Again") is a Dutch television show hosted by Paul de Leeuw from 2005 to 2009. The programme was produced by VARA, one of the contributors to the Dutch public broadcasting group Netherlands Public Broadcasting.

Broadcast weekly on Saturday evenings, the programme consisted of surprising audience members by fulfilling wishes sent in by their family or friends, celebrity interviews and various performances. The show had a distinctive, quirky feel based upon the personal comedy and tastes of De Leeuw, including performances by Arijan van Bavel portraying his character "Adje". The show had its own small band, led by Cor Bakker, and also featured national and international acts, such as Son de Sol, Kylie Minogue, Lionel Richie, Robbie Williams, Lady Gaga and Adele, who usually performed live in the show in addition to being interviewed. In most cases these acts were supported by the show's house band.

Mooi! Weer De Leeuw is probably best known internationally for its appearance in the Eurovision Song Contest 2006, where De Leeuw gave the results of the Dutch televote from the programme's studio (the show was usually broadcast during the time period occupied by Eurovision). De Leeuw, who is openly homosexual, flirted with the male presenter Sakis Rouvas and gave out his supposed mobile phone number. The exchange was broadcast to hundreds of millions of viewers and earned De Leeuw criticism from several of the event's commentators, some of whom refused to translate it.

The programme was broadcast in the Netherlands on Nederland 1 and was simulcast on the international Dutch-language channel BVN.

After the show's conclusion in 2009, De Leeuw continued presenting a new show, Lieve Paul (Dear Paul), which has a similar concept but focuses on answering audience members' questions instead of fulfilling their wishes.
