= Arijan van Bavel =

Dutch actor

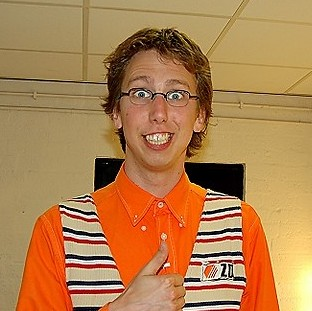
- Van Bavel as Adje in 2006
- Born: 21 February 1979 (age 47); Breda, The Netherlands
- Years active: 2000-present
- Known for: Mooi! Weer de Leeuw

Arijan van Bavel (born 21 February 1979, Breda) is a Dutch actor, entertainer, former television personality and entrepreneur.

Van Bavel acclaimed nationwide fame in 2006 as Adje van Nispen, a recurring sidekick in Paul de Leeuw's popular television programme Mooi! Weer De Leeuw. Van Bavel starred in this programme until 2009, when it was axed.

== Early life ==
Van Bavel was born in Breda, but grew up in Molenschot. As a child, he was involved in playing youth theatre. After finishing school, Van Bavel started studying theatre therapy at the HAN University of Applied Sciences, where he graduated with a degree in 2003. During his studies, he was involved as an entertainer in the Efteling amusement park. Van Bavel also played a small role as an actor in a reconstruction scene in Opsporing Verzocht in 2005.

== Career ==
=== 2005-2009: Mooi! Weer de Leeuw ===
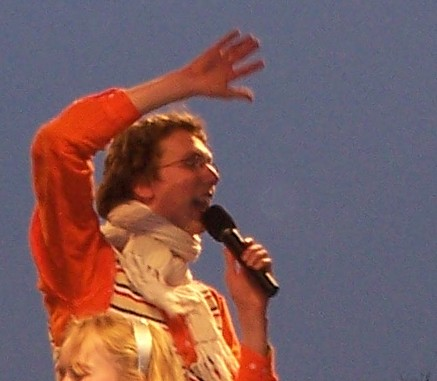
Van Bavel as Adje in 2007.

In 2005, after ending his contract with the Efteling, Van Bavel founded his own theatre company De Zingende Decoupeerzaag and was preparing to tour the Netherlands with a comedy play. Being told by theatre directors that he should appear on television before being able to sell out theatres, Van Bavel decided to send an email to the editorial board of Mooi! Weer de Leeuw. In this email, which he wrote under the pseudonym "Adje van Nispen", he asked the board whether he and his fanfare orchestra De Zingende Decoupeerzaag would be able to perform an ode to their conductor who had been celebrating his 50th anniversary.

The editorial board of the programme did not research De Zingende Decoupeerzaag, thought the request was real and decided to invite the group to one of the broadcasts. During the broadcast, Paul de Leeuw turned towards Van Bavel, who had dressed himself up in a classic orange fanfare costume and asked him about his request. Van Bavel acted visibly confused and failed to remember quite why he and his fanfare had ended up in the show, creating a lot of laughter among the audience. De Leeuw, who honestly thought Adje van Nispen was a legit person, invited him to come on stage with him and sing a song with him. Van Bavel, with his theatre background, performed the song perfectly in tune, clearly to the surprise of De Leeuw. As a result, De Leeuw decided to re invite Adje to another episode.

The episode with Adje van Nispen did well in the television ratings and received a wide public resonance. Meanwhile, De Leeuw started doubting whether Adje van Nispen was a real person and decided to let him be researched. When De Leeuw found out that Van Bavel was an actor, he was that impressed that he decided to acquire him as a sidekick for the rest of the season. De Leeuw also ordered all information about Van Bavel to be removed online to create the illusion that Adje was a genuine person and not an act.

Adje became a popular character on the show and quickly acquired a cult following. As a result, De Leeuw gave Adje his own segment, titled Adje's A-Team. However, the segment and the continuous on-camera abuse and enslaving of the character Adje led to criticism as well. During the New Year's Eve episode of 2006, De Leeuw took Adje by his scarf, trying to strangle him. In another Sinterklaas-themed episode, De Leeuw tried to forcefully drown Adje several times, clearly also to the surprise of Van Bavel. In 2007, Paul de Leeuw and Adje received wide criticism from the Dutch Christian community, including the SGP, after perching Adje to a cross during a concert in the Gelredome. Nonetheless, Van Bavel later said that although De Leeuw and he did surprise each other at times, he had never felt unsafe or that borders had been crossed.

In 2008, Dutch newspaper De Volkskrant revealed that Van Bavel was an actor and that Adje van Nispen did not exist. However, a large share of the audience of Mooi! Weer de Leeuw stayed unaware of this given until the show was axed in 2009. Van Bavel later appeared as Adje in the Mooi! Weer de Leeuw spin-offs Lieve Paul and X De Leeuw.

=== 2010-present: Theatre work ===
In 2009, Tilburg mayor Ruud Vreeman offered Van Bavel to create a "theatre for the people" in an empty cinema in the city. The offer led to a large local political row with accusations of corruption and misuse of power. In 2009, as a result of the controversy, Van Bavel decided to withdraw himself from the project.

In 2010, De Leeuw and Van Bavel officially ended their artistic collaboration.

Van Bavel decided to abstain from appearing on television and started focusing primarily on theatre and business for most of the 2010s.

== Personal life ==
Van Bavel was in a relationship with politician and Winterswijk mayor Joris Bengevoord between 2012 and 2018.
