= HAN International School of Business =

Coordinates: 51°59′20″N 5°56′57″E

International School of Business
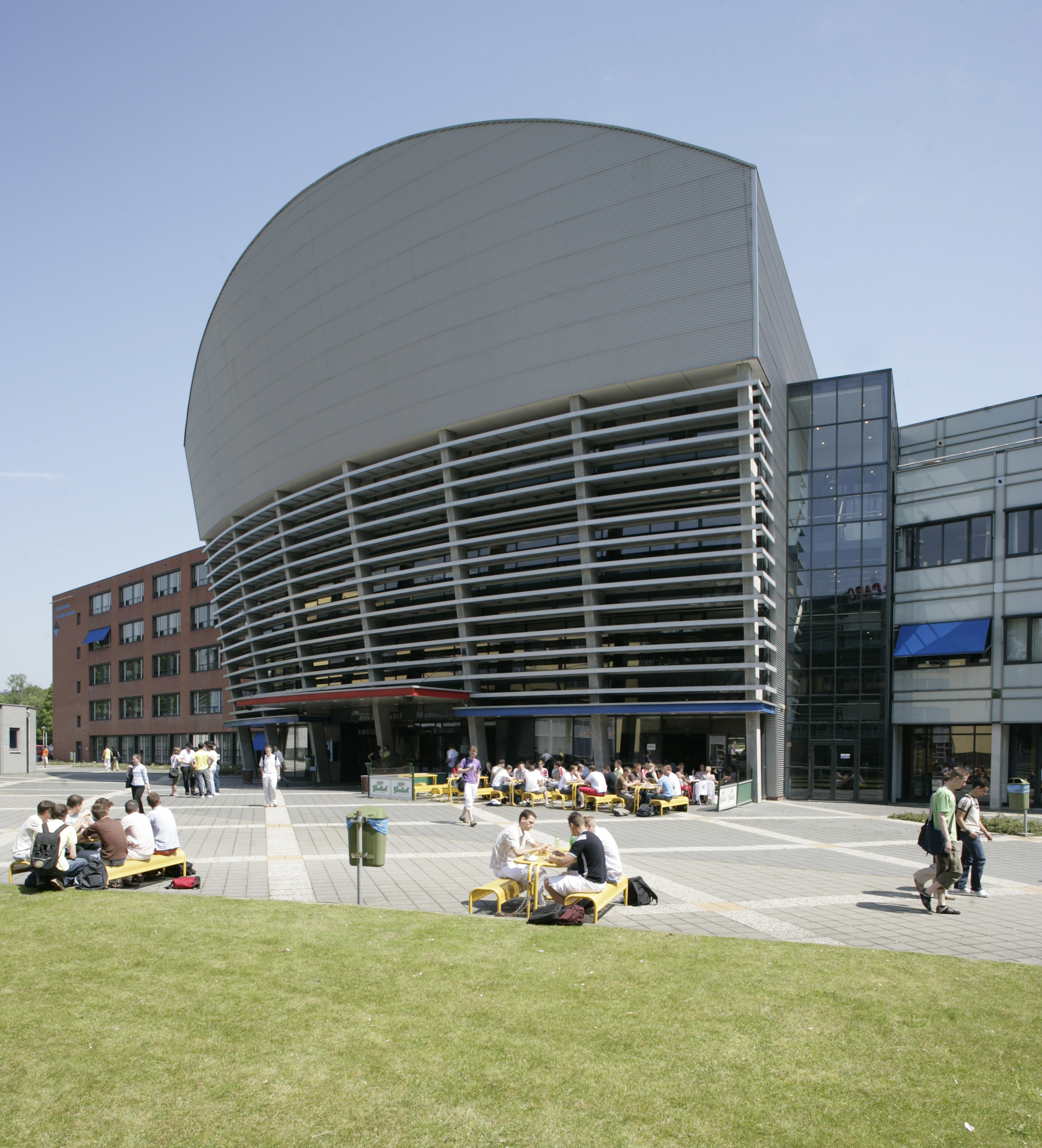
- Type: Public
- Parent institution: HAN University of Applied Sciences
- Dean: Arjan Keunen
- Students: 1500
- Location: Arnhem, The Netherlands
- Campus: Arnhem
- Website: www.hanuniversity.com/en/about-us/han-organization/schools/international-school-of-business/

The HAN International School of Business is the business school of the HAN University of Applied Sciences in Arnhem, the Netherlands. It offers Bachelor's degrees in international business, communications, logistics and management. All programmes are taught in English.

== International focus ==
The school has agreements with about 100 international partner institutes. Cooperation agreements include student and staff exchange programmes, joint research and the development of common projects and degree programs.

== Facilities ==
As part of HAN University of Applied Sciences, students can make use of all of the HAN's facilities in Arnhem and Nijmegen.

== Academics ==
=== Bachelors ===
- Communication
- International Business (accredited by Foundation for International Business Administration Accreditation and European Foundation for Management Development).

=== Master ===
- Circular Economy

=== Associate Degree ===
- Business Administration - Sustainable International Business (in Dutch)

=== International Student Association ===
The International Student Association (ISA) creates leisure activities such as parties and trips to other cities.

=== Student Management Association ===
The Student Management Association (SMA) is known for organizing events such as: guest lectures, workshops and theme days/weeks.
