= 4L Trophy =

Yearly humanitarian rally across the Moroccan desert

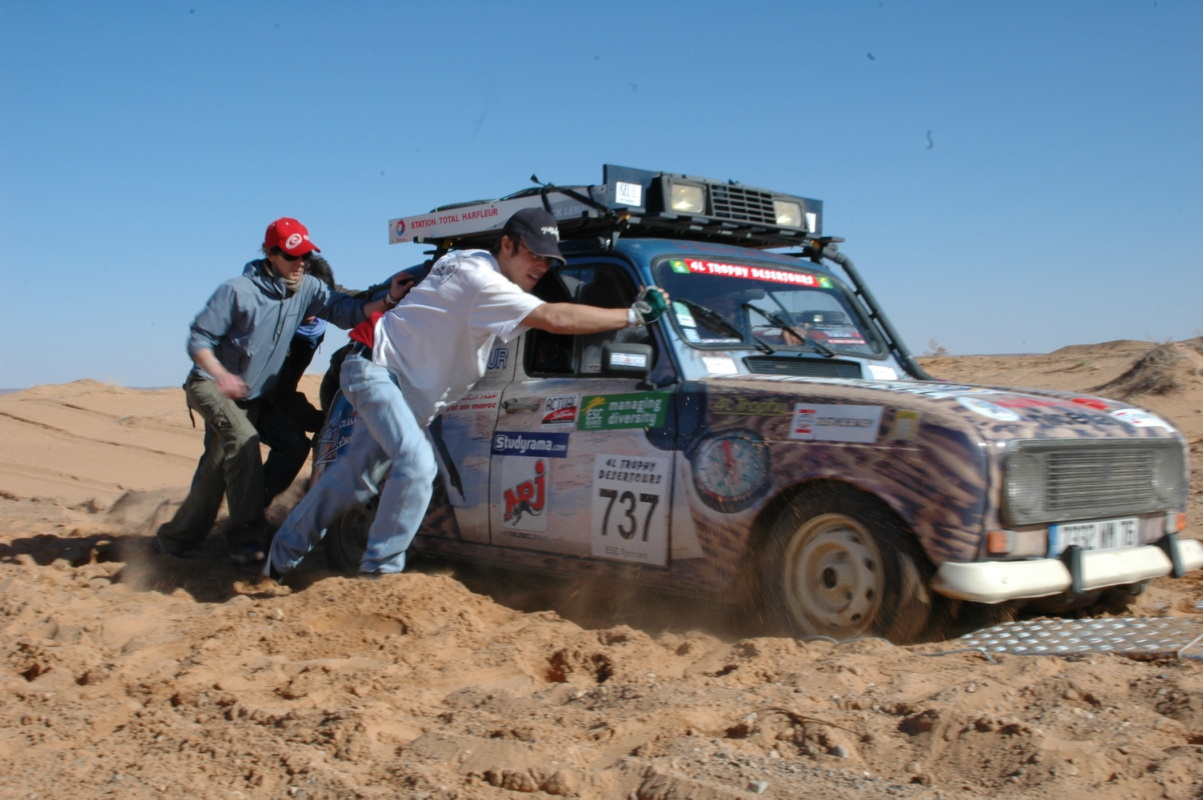
Team in the Moroccan desert

The 4L Trophy is a yearly humanitarian rally across the Moroccan desert. Established in 1997 upon the initiative of Jean-Jacques Rey, it is organised by Desertours in a partnership with ESC Rennes School of Business. The rally can only be joined by those under 29 years of age with Renault 4 cars. Its objective is to provide children with school supplies.

Its thousands of participants deliver about 80 tons of school furniture in Morocco after driving 6,000 km (3,728 mi) from departure sites in Bordeaux and Paris. 2017 marked the 20th anniversary of the 4L Trophy, counting 2,900 participants from 15 countries.

== Presentation ==
=== Humanitarian Dimension ===
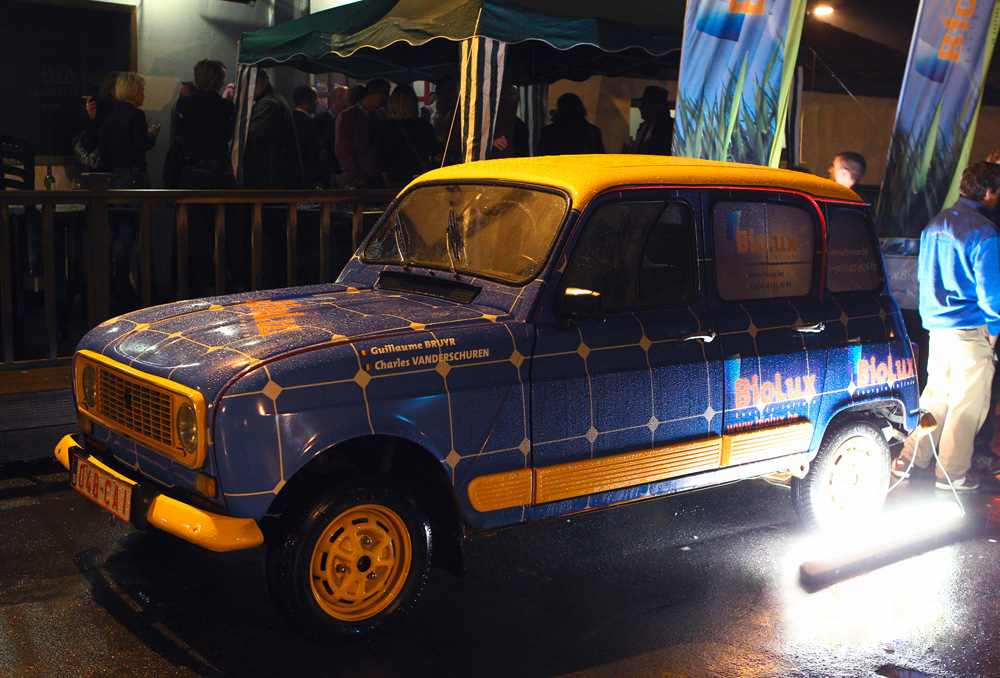
The "Renault 4 GTL" from team number 1308 (4L Trophy 2011)

The objective of the event is schooling 3000 Moroccan children, that is why each team aims at delivering 50 kg of school equipment.

Each year more than 50 tons of school supplies are brought in Morocco. One part is given to the Moroccan League for the Protection of Children in Fez and the other part is distributed in schools along the route.

There is a strong relationship that has been developed between the rally and different associations, for instance with the association "Enfant du désert" (children in the desert). The association was created to encourage education for kids living in this particularly poor region of Morocco. Each year, children and students meet in the camping area and students gives the results of their materials rising to the association and play with the children. There is an official list of what students are supposed to bring. The main elements that are expected are school and sports materials but also medication. According to the rally organization, “Enfant du désert” got €33,665 from the participants and Deloitte and 20000 children will benefit this year from equipment gathered by participants in the rally. Another partnership with “Rire médecin” has been created in 2013 for the first time. Students were asked to give money and to support some actions for this association that aims to support children who are currently in hospital by providing them with games, activities and so on. Participants in the rally have been asked to wear a clown red nose. This video has then been promoted by different media to advertise this association and raise funds.

=== Sport aspect ===
Every day, the aim is to win the day's stage using the Road Book, a map of Morocco and a compass. The ranking is based on the teams' ability to drive in the desert and to reach the checkpoints as required. The aim is not to be the fastest team but to be able to reach the meeting point by doing as few kilometers as possible. And desert implies a lot of challenges. First of all, there is, of course, no road in the desert. The main obstacle for participants is called "oued" in Arab which means sand sea in English. These oued require a lot of ability to go through without trouble. Moreover, the car, a 4L Renault is not typically the best car to go through that kind of troubles. Finally, visibility is often weak in the desert because of sand raised by other cars.

=== A citizen Eco Rally ===
Respecting the environment is a concern of 4L Trophy.

The partnership with CO_{2} Solidarity aims at making up for CO_{2} emissions by funding a program for environmental protection in order to improve the living conditions of Moroccan people.

The participation in the "Clean Desert" operation involves meticulous cleaning of bivouacs and rehabilitation of tracks. All Road Books are completely printed on recycled paper.

The partnership between the 4L Trophy organization and the financial advising firm Deloitte lead to the creation of the Deloitte-4l- Eco Challenge in 2008. This challenge consists in awarding the best action imagined by students participating to the 4L Trophy. For instance, in 2011, the Deloitte-4L-Eco challenge was awarded to a team from the Rouen Engineering school for installing a solar water pump in a village with no domestic water. Ten pre-selected teams receive €500 and the final winner receive €2500. The projects are chosen by the level of their social added value and ecological added.

=== Media coverage ===
As it has got more and more popular, 4L Trophy has started to attract more and more media and is now covered by national media as well as local ones, newspaper and video show. 4L trophy is followed by national media as for instance the Figaro but also by specialist media as for example Turbo that dedicates an article to this event each year. The most important media partners for the rally are: -France Bleu Radio, which report the results and some events on a daily basis during the rally. -Turbo, which is the most popular car TV show in France that send a team to film the rally and then broadcast it. -The rally also has its own press service that sends news and photos to journalists that are not following the rally. Also, for the first time last year, they created the 4L TV, an online TV channel, and upload news, videos and pictures every evening. Moreover, during the rally, they organized a broadcast on Dailymotion direct from the desert, in Merzouga. This media coverage as a big impact for the organization “4L Trophy” as well as for its participants since firms are more likely to sponsor a car if they hope to get some positive return for the stickers on it.

=== Financing the project ===
Financing the project is a hard part of the 4L Trophy for students. Almost every team rely on private funds to finance their project. The cost of participating in the rally is estimated to be between €5500 and €10000. The main expenses are enrollment, which costs €3300, and buying and preparing the car, which costs between €1500 and €4000. The main way to raise funds is by sponsoring. The idea is that a company or individual can “buy” one part of the car and put its logo on it. The company can hope to get a positive return on this, because 4L Trophy is quite popular in France and well covered by media. In exchange, the company will give money or advantages. It is often the case between technicians and team. Technicians agree to prepare the car and get a space in the car in exchange. Teams also get money from the now famous “operation stylo”. The idea is to buy a pen with 4L Trophy stickers for €0.25 each and then to sell it back on a marketplace or commercial center. This appears to be an efficient way to raise funds.

== Organisation ==
=== Route ===
Teams leave from Paris and Bordeaux in the direction of Algeciras to sail to Morocco. Thus all participants will have to drive through France and Spain.

Fez is the first stage where the participants will have to cross the mountains, dunes and wadis during nearly 1500 km of trails in the Moroccan Desert.

The arrival will be in Marrakesh where a closing ceremony will take place.

=== Departure village ===
Each year the rally starts with a "departure village" that gathers together all the participants in the rally.

This is also the opportunity to conduct technical and administrative audits, compliance checks of vehicles, passports and car insurance, do an interview with a doctor, check the list of school supplies, etc. It permits also at the ESC Rennes crew to provide information about the adventure they will be facing.

=== Requirement and services for cars ===
Each car has to be prepared according to some criteria. These criteria are defined so that each car will be able to cross the desert with minimum troubles. The main modification is the protection plate each team has to add to its car in order to avoid troubles linked to stones you can find in the desert zone. The organization will check each car before the departure. Checking operation focuses mostly on the structure of the car and the problem that it may cause. It may happen that a car is not accepted and does not meet the requirement. In this case, the team won't get the right to take the departure. A technical help is available in the camp each day after joining the camp. The help is provided by volunteers who are mechanical professional. This service is included in the enrollment fee and is free of charge during the rally.

== History ==
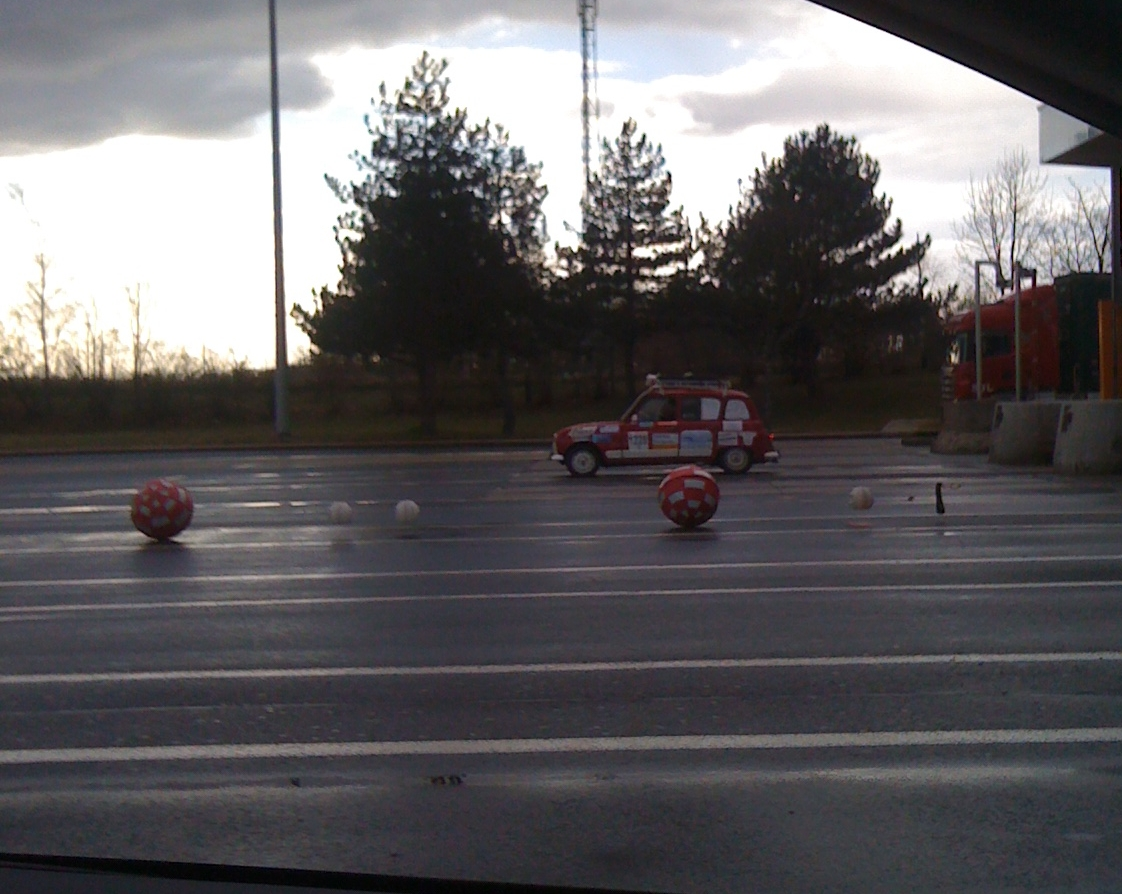
Just departed from Paris in rainy weather

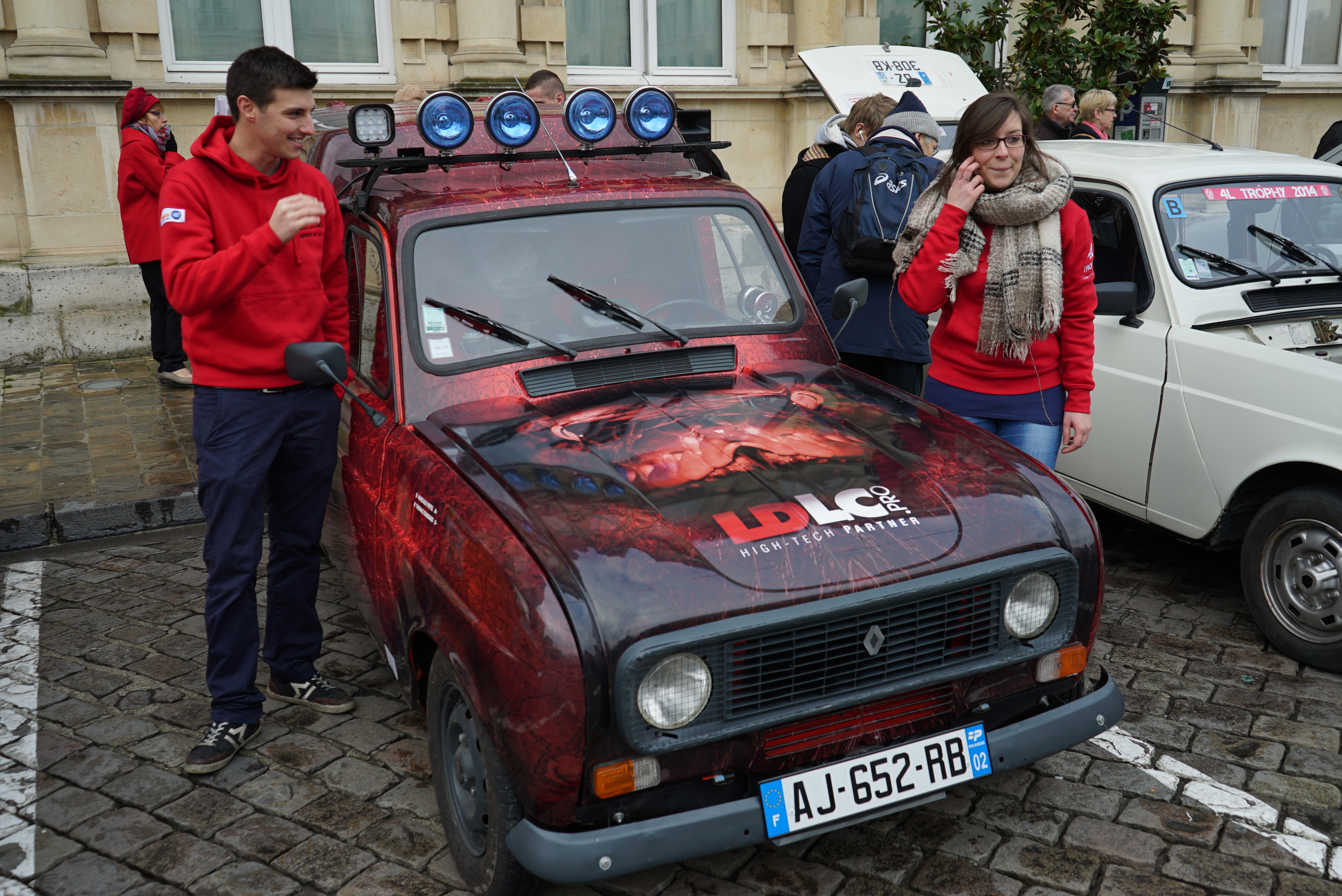
2016, team

- 1998: 1st event of the rally 4L Trophy. 5 teams
- 1999: 8 teams
- 2000: 15 teams
- 2001: 4th event - 45 teams

Start of the collaboration between Désertours and ESC Rennes

- 2002: 100 teams - The media are increasingly present
- 2003: 6th event - 180 teams
- 2004: 270 teams

1st Departure Village in Paris (Stade de France). TV and radios become present on the event

- 2005: 8th event

Launch of European Challenge. 1st departure village Trocadéro. 1st closing night at La Fantasia (Marrakesh). Images sent to the daily satellite TV channels.

- 2006: 672 teams

1st press conference. Creating an Enterprise Village at Trocadéro. The 6 / 9 NRJ live at the Village Depart.

- 2007: 10th event – 1040 teams
- 2010: 13th event - 1200 teams started from Paris and Bordeaux on February 18, 2010
