= Renault 4 =

Small economy car produced by Renault (1961–1994)

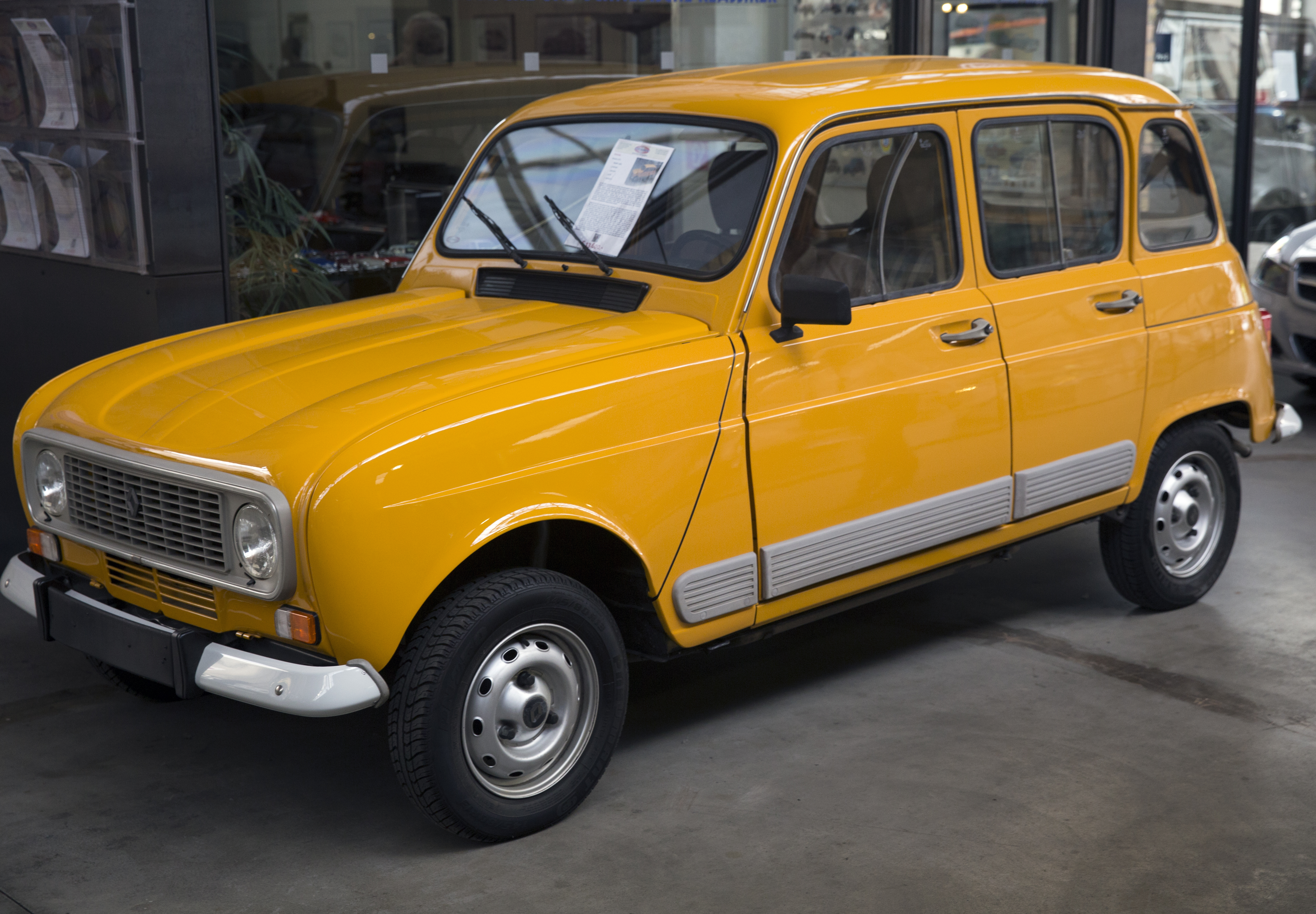
- 1984 Renault 4 GTL

Overview
- Manufacturer: Renault
- Also called: Renault R4; Renault 4L (Quatrelle); Renault R3
- Production: 1961–1992 (until 1994 in Slovenia); Over eight million units
- Assembly: France: Billancourt; Algeria: Algiers (CARAL); Argentina: Santa Isabel (IKA); Australia: Heidelberg; Belgium: Vilvoorde (RIB); Chile: Arica (Industria Automotriz Renault Chile); Chile: Los Andes (Cormecánica); Colombia: Envigado (SOFASA); Ireland: Naas; Ireland: Wexford; Italy: Milan (Portello Plant); Madagascar: Antananarivo (SOMACOA); Mexico: Ciudad Sahagún; Morocco: Casablanca; Portugal: Guarda; Spain: Valladolid (FASA-Renault); Uruguay: Montevideo (Renault Mini 4 — local version); Yugoslavia: Ljubljana; Yugoslavia/Slovenia: Novo Mesto (IMV)

Body and chassis
- Class: B-segment, small economy family car
- Body style: 5-door hatchback 2-door panel van 2-door pickup truck
- Layout: Front mid-engine, front-wheel drive
- Related: Renault 5 Renault 6 Renault 7 Renault Rodeo

Powertrain
- Engine: 603 cc 690 I4 (R3 only); 747 cc 680 I4; 782 cc 839 I4; 845 cc 800/B1B I4; 956 cc C1C I4; 1108 cc C1E I4
- Transmission: 3-speed manual 4-speed manual

Dimensions
- Wheelbase: 2,440 mm (96.1 in) (right); 2,395 mm (94.3 in) (left)
- Length: 3,663 mm (144.2 in)
- Width: 1,485 mm (58.5 in)
- Height: 1,470 mm (57.9 in)
- Kerb weight: 600–750 kg (1,323–1,653 lb)

Chronology
- Predecessor: Renault 4CV
- Successor: Renault 4 E-Tech

The Renault 4, or R4 in short (and 4L, pronounced "Quatrelle" in French French pronunciation: [ˈkatʁɛl]), is an economy car built by the French company Renault from 1961 to 1994. Although it was first marketed as a short estate or wagon, its minimal rear body length and its top-hinged, single-piece tail-gate means that it is now recognised as the world's first mass-produced hatchback.

It was also the first time Renault had used a front-wheel drive layout in a family car, (Note: The 1959 Estafette light commercial van was Renault's first front-wheel drive van.) the first in a string of Renault's and other carmakers' front-wheel drives that all still used longitudinal engine placement, including Renault's models R5, R6, and R16; joining Citroën's 2CV (the Renault 4's prime competition), and Citroën Ami and DS, as well as models from Audi and Saab, before most, including Renault, switched to transverse engines, like on the 1959 Mini. A bare-bones, entry-level Renault 3, or R3 was also offered in 1961/1962.

The car was launched when decades of economic stagnation gave way to growing prosperity in France, and surging car ownership. The first million cars were produced by 1 February 1966, less than four and a half years after launch. Eventually over eight million were built, in twenty factories on four continents. The Renault 4 was a commercial success because of the timing of its introduction, and the merits of its value for money design. In early 2020, the 33-year production run of the Renault 4 was counted as the seventeenth most long-lived single generation car in history.

Additionally, the R4 provided a lot of (initial) internals and mechanical components to the later, more fashionable, and also very successful Renault 5.

== Origins and strategy ==
The Renault 4 was Renault's response to the 1948 Citroën 2CV. Renault was able to review the advantages and disadvantages of the 2CV design. The Citroën had made motoring available to low-income people in France, and especially to farmers and other people in rural areas, for whom the car was as much a working tool as personal transport. The 2CV had been designed in the 1930s for use in the French countryside where the road network was poor — speed was not a requirement but a good ride, useful rough-terrain ability, a versatile body for load carrying, and economy and simplicity of operation were its key considerations. However, by the late 1950s, the 2CV was becoming outdated. Rural roads in France were improved and the national system of autoroutes was being developed. Agriculture was becoming more mechanized with fewer smallholdings and family farms for which the 2CV was designed. The Citroën had also proved popular with people living in towns and cities as affordable, economical transport but the 2CV's rural design brief made it less than ideal as a city car and, despite improvements, the late-1950s 2CV had a top speed of just 70 km/h (43 mph). Its air-cooled two-cylinder engine was reliable and economical but noisy and offered poor performance. The 2CV's suspension gave it an excellent ride and good grip and handling but was mechanically complex with many moving parts that required regular maintenance and lubrication at intervals as low as every 1000 miles (1600km). With its roots in the 1930s, the 2CV's styling was also outdated and, with its separate wing/fenders, had a relatively narrow and cramped body for its overall footprint. While the Citroën had been designed during the Great Depression when money was tight and living standards were relatively low, by the 1960s the French economy was growing and people would be able to afford a more modern, refined, and less utilitarian small car.

In early 1956, Renault Chairman Pierre Dreyfus launched this new project: designing a new model to replace the rear engined 4CV and compete against the Citroën 2CV that would become an everyman's car, capable of satisfying the needs of most consumers. It would be a family car, a woman's car, a farmer's car, or a city car. Dreyfus summed up his intention for project by requesting his staff produce "a blue jeans car" — a car that, like the denim trousers that were becoming increasingly popular as casual wear fashion items at the time, could be as useful for recreation as for work, and be appealing to customers of all demographics.

The Renault 4 shared many design traits with the older Citroën 2CV to allow it to fulfill the same role as a versatile utility car, especially for people in rural France and other parts of the world with poor roads. It had a large structural platform with a separate body. It had front-wheel drive, long-travel fully independent suspension, and rack and pinion steering. It had a simple body with minimal equipment, a large space for cargo or luggage, and 'deckchair' seats which could be easily removed. However, the Renault 4 updated this basic concept with a larger four-cylinder water-cooled engine with a sealed cooling system offering much better refinement and performance than the contemporary 2CV, with a top speed of over 104 km/h (65 mph). The suspension consisted of torsion bars which required no regular maintenance. The boxy full-width body offered more space for both passengers and luggage than the similar-sized 2CV and the car boasted an early hatchback body for greater practicality.

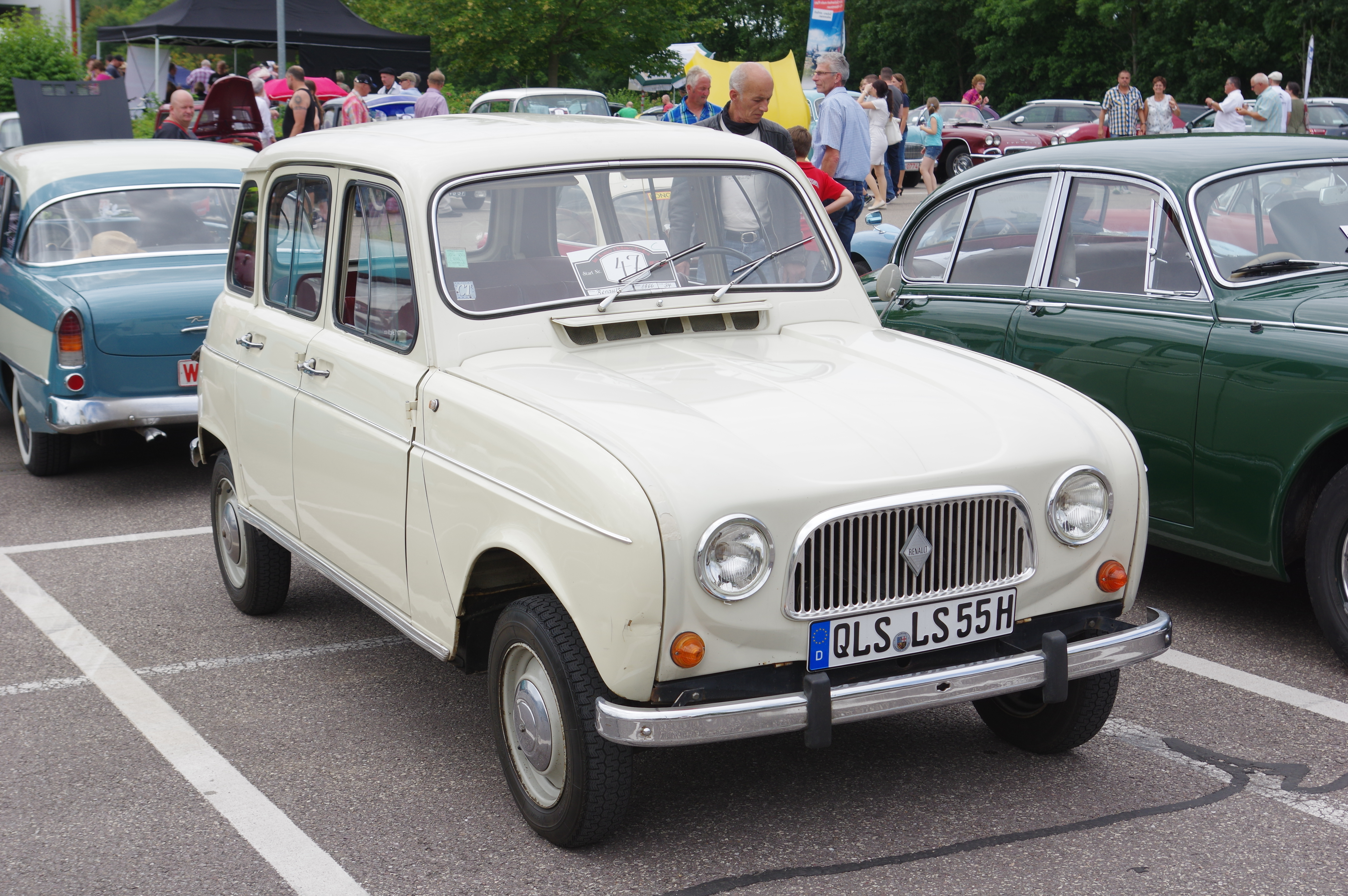
1961–1967 Renault 4

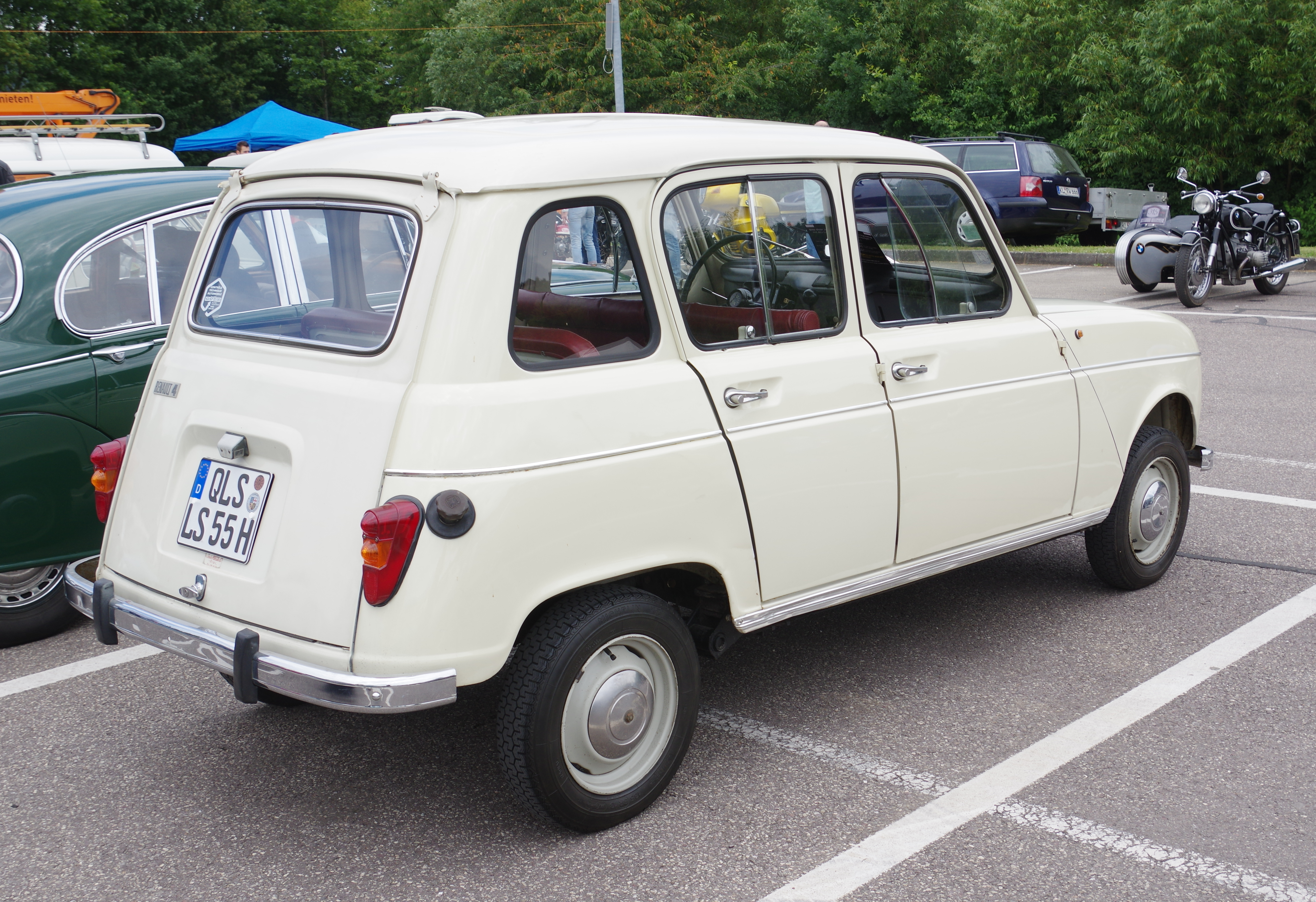
Rear view (1961–1967)

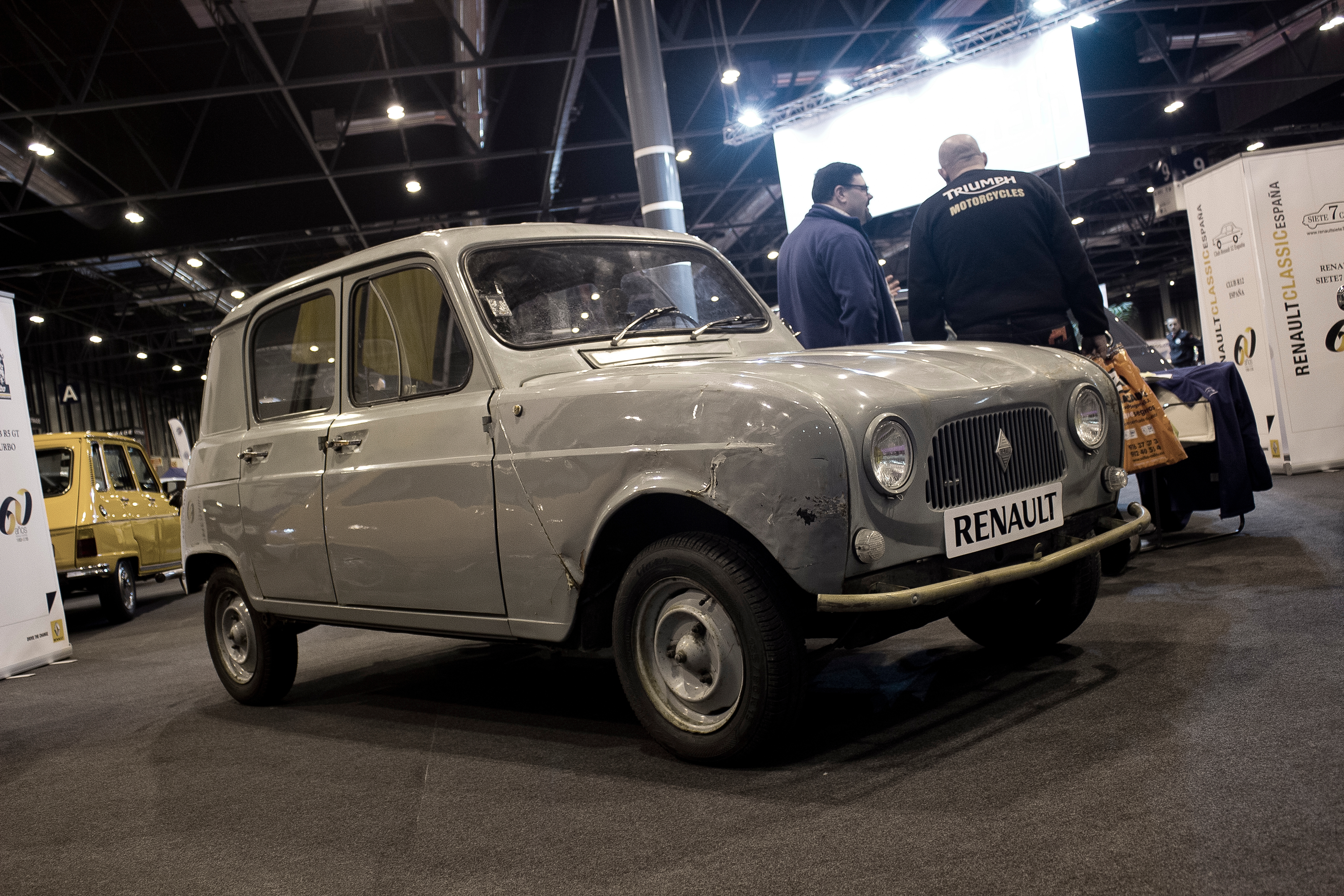
The 1961–1962 Renault 3 was meant to compete with the 2CV; available only in grey it had a smaller, 603cc, 3CV engine and no windows in the c/d-pillar. It was discontinued after just 2,526 sales.

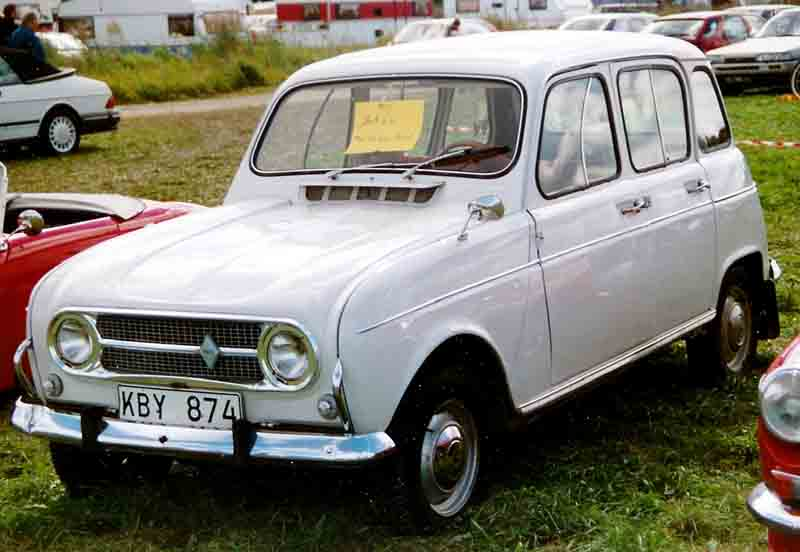
1967–1974 Renault 4L: For 1968 the car received a more modern aluminium grille that it would retain until 1974

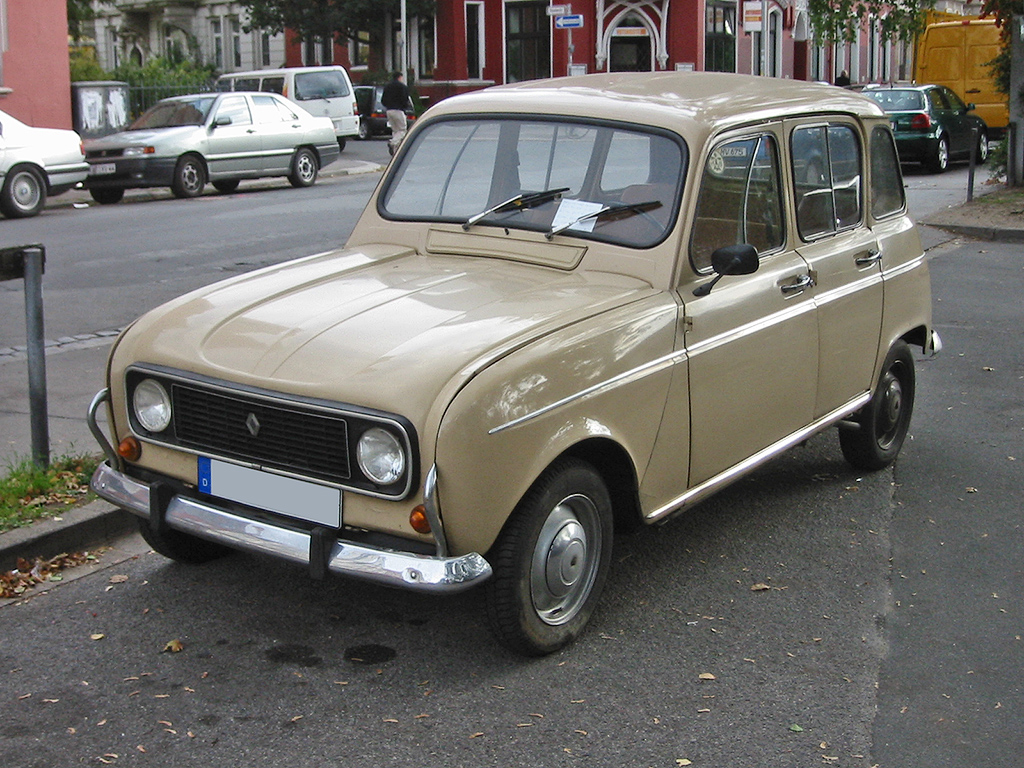
1974–1978 Renault 4L: In 1974 a plastic grille replaced the metal one

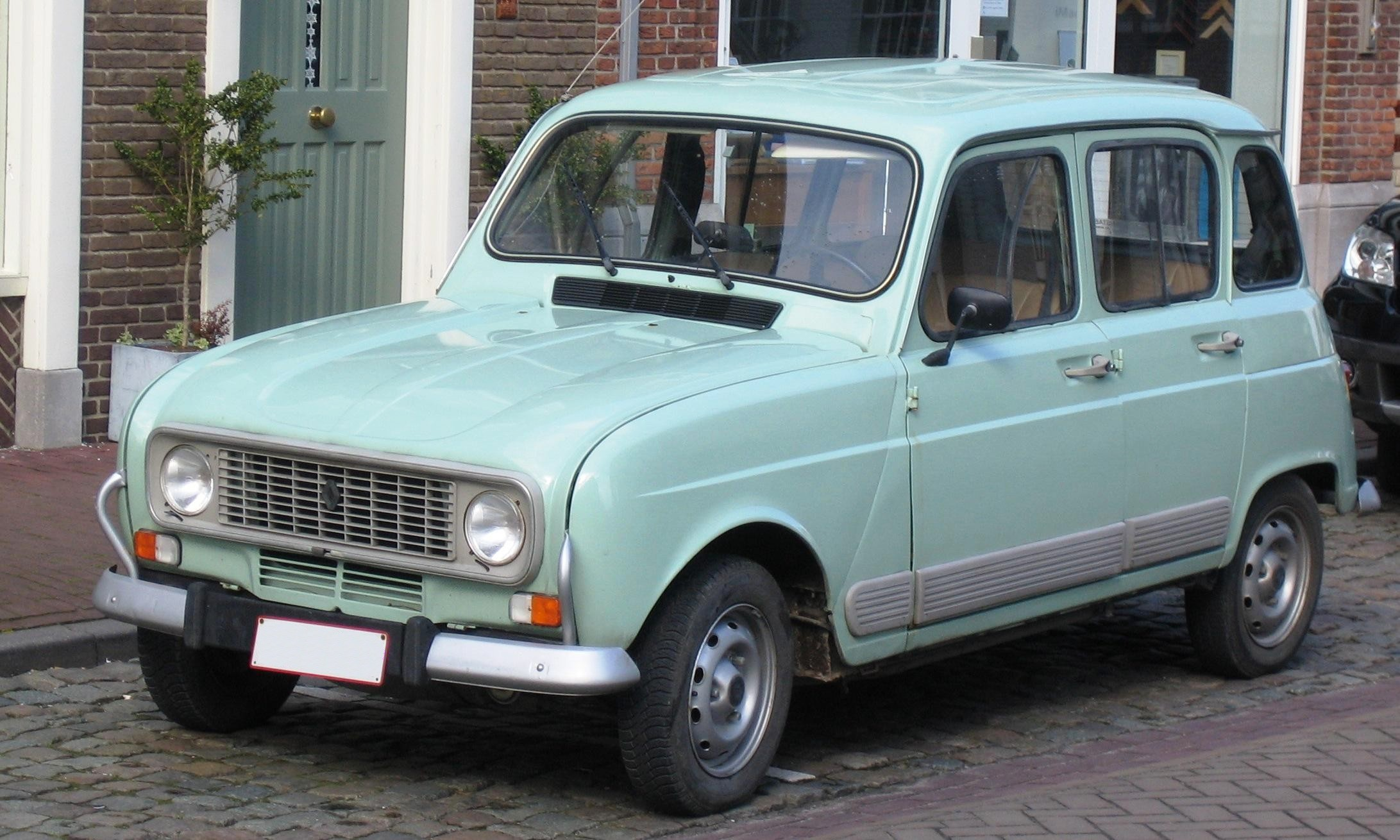
1978 Renault 4GTL: a further mild facelift followed, on European market cars, in 1978

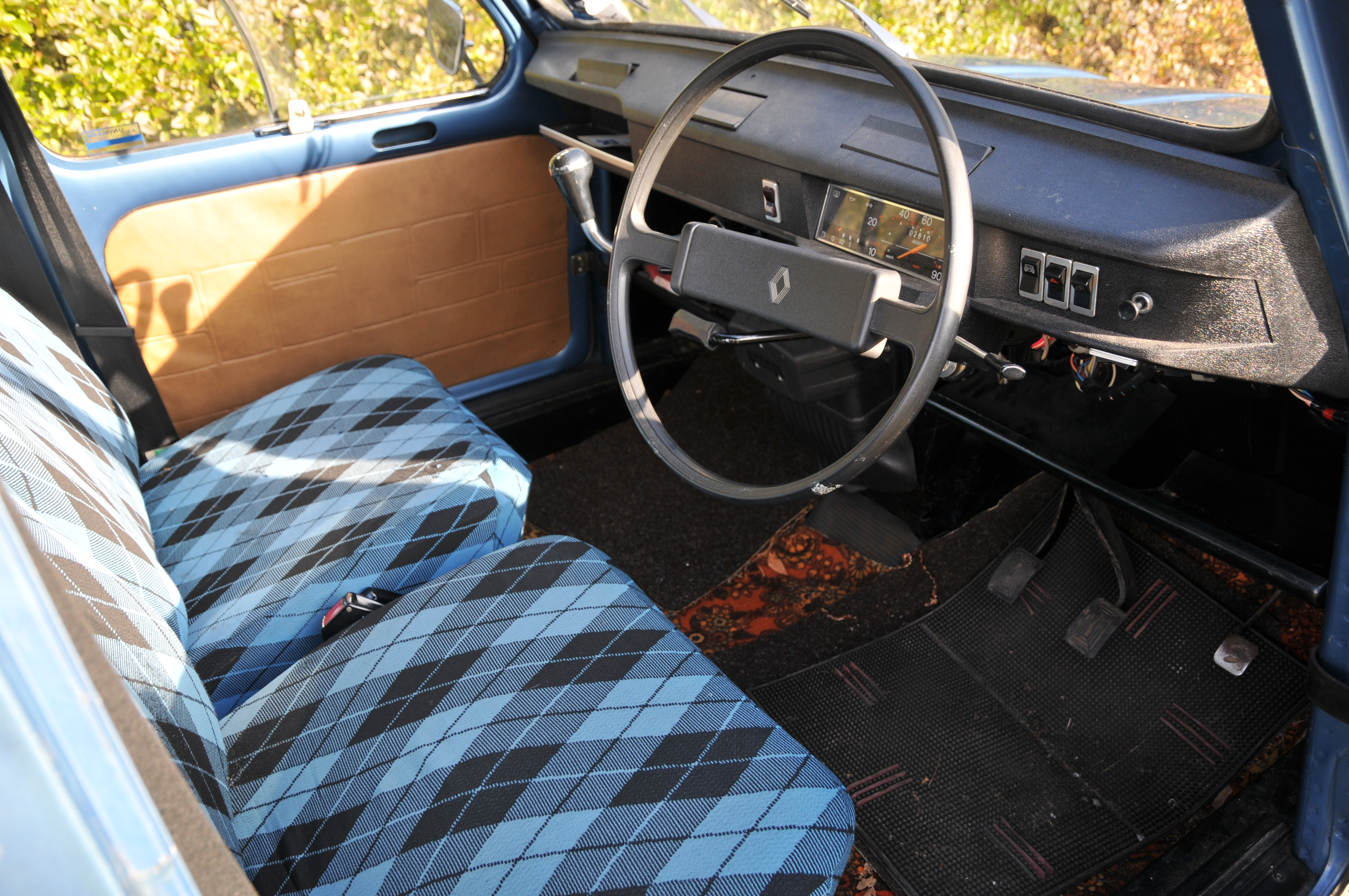
Renault 4 TL interior

== Launch of the R3 and R4 ==
Renault launched the Renault 3 and the Renault 4 simultaneously in July 1961. The cars shared the same body and most mechanical components, but the R3 was powered by a 603 cc version of the engine while the R4 featured a 747 cc engine. This placed the R3 in the 3CV taxation class while the R4 was in the 4CV class. Maximum power output was rated by Renault as 22.5 hp (16.5 kW) for the R3, and 26.5 or 32 hp (19.5 or 23.5 kW) for the R4, depending on price level and the type of carburettor fitted. Initially the base versions of the R3 and R4 came with a thick C-pillar behind each of the rear doors. Quarter glass was a 400 franc option for the basic R4. The extra visibility increased the weight of the vehicle, but these windows soon became standard for all R4s.

The R3 and R4 were targeted at the Citroën 2CV that employed soft springs and long wheel travel to absorb bumps on rough roads. The Renault 3/4 applied the same approach and two models appeared at the Paris Motor Show in 1961 on a specialized demonstration display that incorporated an irregular rolling road. Visitors could sit inside a car, which remained undisturbed while the suspension absorbed the erratic bumps of the rolling road. In 1962 Renault employed the same display at the Turin Motor Show.

The basic version of the R3 was priced 40 francs below the lowest-priced version of the Citroën 2CV in 1961 and featured painted bumpers and grille, a simplified instrument panel, a single sun visor, no windshield washer, and no interior door trim panels. This trim was also offered with the more powerful R4 engine. The R4L with six side windows, bumper and grille in chrome, as well as a less spartan interior cost 400 francs (roughly 8%) more than the R4 with its four side windows. However, as with the Renault 4CV "Service" in 1953, customers shunned the basic model and in October 1962, the Renault R3 was discontinued, along with the most basic version of the Renault 4.

A "Super" version (branded "de Luxe" in some export markets) with opening rear quarter-light windows and extra trim was also offered. The de Luxe and Super versions of the R4L received a version of the engine from the Renault Dauphine giving them an engine capacity of 845 cc. After the withdrawal of the 603 cc engined R3, the 747 cc R4 model continued to be listed with an entry-level recommended retail price, but the slightly larger-engined L versions were more popular. By 1965, Renault had removed the extra "R" from their model names: the Renault R4L thus became the Renault 4L.

== Engines ==
Early versions of the Renault R4 used engines and transmissions from the Renault 4CV. The original design brief called for an engine size between 600 cc and 700 cc, but there was no consensus as to whether to use a four-cylinder unit or to follow Citroën with a two-cylinder unit. With Volkswagen rapidly growing market share across Europe and North America, Renault also gave serious consideration to an air-cooled boxer motor option for the forthcoming R3/R4. However, using the existing water-cooled unit from the 4CV was a solution, especially in view of the extended period of teething troubles encountered by the Renault Frégate, which was then Renault's most recent attempt to develop an innovative powerplant. The existing engines were larger than that specified by management for the new 4CV, but the automaker addressed this by reducing the bore so that the overall capacity of the base engine for the new R3 worked out to be 603 cc, comfortably at the lower end of the required 600–700 cc range. However, since Renault already produced the 747 cc version of the engine that was well proven in the 4CV, it made sense to use this as well in what would in many respects be the older car's successor. Therefore, in 1961, the R3 had a 49 mm bore and 80 mm stroke, while the R4 received the 54.5 mm × 80 mm existing engine.

Moving the engine from the rear of the 4CV to the front of the new model involved significant planning: design changes to the unit were introduced as part of the process. The inlet manifold was now a steel casting whereas on the 4CV it had been constructed of a light-weight alloy: this was driven by cost considerations now that aluminum was not so inexpensive as it had been fifteen years earlier. Renault also took the opportunity to introduce a feature which subsequently became mainstream. Renault also designed a "sealed-for-life" cooling system, supported by a small expansion tank on the right side of the engine bay. The cooling system contained antifreeze intended to enable operation without topping up or other intervention throughout a car's life provided ambient temperatures below -40°C were avoided.

The engines were larger than the small 425 cc (later 602 cc and 29 PS) engines in the 2CV. The R4 always had a four-cylinder watercooled engine. The original Renault R4's engine capacity of 747 cc served to differentiate the model from the more powerful Renault Dauphine, but the Dauphine's 845 cc engine was used in the 4 itself from 1963 onwards: for most markets at this stage the Dauphine engine now came as standard in the top of the range Renault R4 Super, and was available in some other versions only as an optional extra. Given that Renault’s 603, 747, and 845 cc engines all shared the same cylinder stroke and were all of the same basic design, it is likely that there was very little difference between the manufacturing costs of the basic engine block between the three. These three did fall within different taxation classes (3CV, 4CV, and 5CV respectively) but at this end of the market tax levels were by now less of an issue in those European countries that still taxed cars according to engine size.

With time, the increasing trend to the production of Renault 4s in a wide range of countries reduces the validity of generalized statements as to which engines were fitted when: in French-built cars the old 845 cc engine continued in the low versions until the mid-1980s, but in 1978 the top-end Renault 4 GTLs received the new 1108 cc engine: this engine was not new to Renault, however, being the five-bearing "Sierra" engine, first installed in the Estafette van and R8 in the summer of 1962. A smaller version (956 cc) of this new engine finally replaced the by now venerable 845 cc engine in the 4 in 1986. Unlike the original "Billancourt" engine from the 4CV, the Sierra engine rotated in a clockwise direction, so fitting it required reversing the direction of the differential in the gear box in order to avoid producing a car with one forward speed and four reverse speeds.

== Transmission ==
The initial transmission was a three-speed manual, described by one critic as an obsolete feature when compared to the four-speed manual of the then thirteen-year-old Citroën 2CV. The Renault 4 did not inherit its transmission from the Renault 4CV nor from anywhere else: the transmission was newly developed for the car. The dash-mounted gear lever was linked via a straight horizontal rod that passed over the longitudinally mounted engine and clutch directly to the gearbox right at the front. The resulting absence of any linkage at floor level permitted a flat floor across the full width of the car's cabin. Synchromesh featured only on the top two ratios, even though the low power of the engine required frequent gear changes by drivers using normal roads and wishing to make reasonable progress. On this point Renault quickly acknowledged their error and cars produced from 1962 featured synchromesh on all three ratios. In 1968 the Renault 4 finally received a four-speed transmission.

== Structure and running gear ==
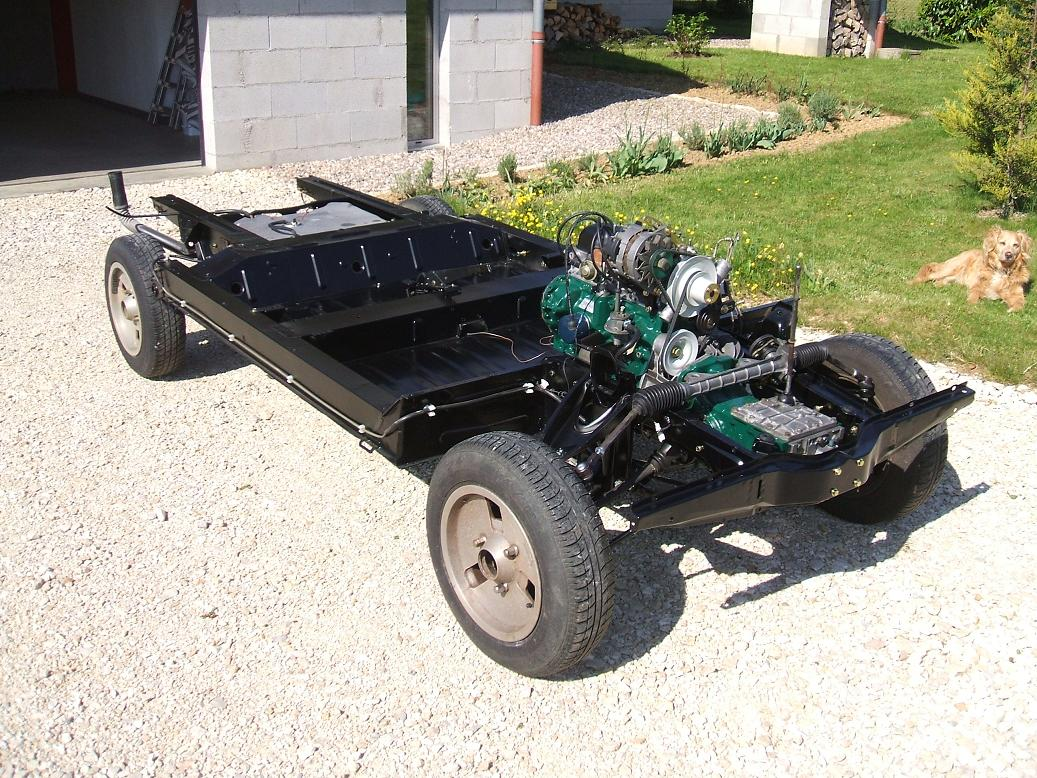
Renault 4 rolling chassis showing the car's platform frame structure.

The three principal new models introduced by Renault since the war featured monocoque "chassisless" construction that was less expensive to manufacture process and reduced operating costs because of lower vehicle weight. The Renault R3/R4 design defied this by now widely accepted mantra, employing a separate platform to which the body shell was then attached. The body's structural role in maintaining the overall rigidity of the car body was thereby reduced, placing less stress on the roof and allowing for thinner window pillars. Although the use made of a separate platform resembled, in some respects, the use that pre-war designs would have made of a chassis, the outcome was a structure described as semi-monocoque, and it would later allow Renault to use the R4 platform, with very little modification, to build new models such as the Renault 6 and Rodeo. (Later, the successful Renault 5 used the R4 running gear, but in a monocoque shell).

== Suspension ==
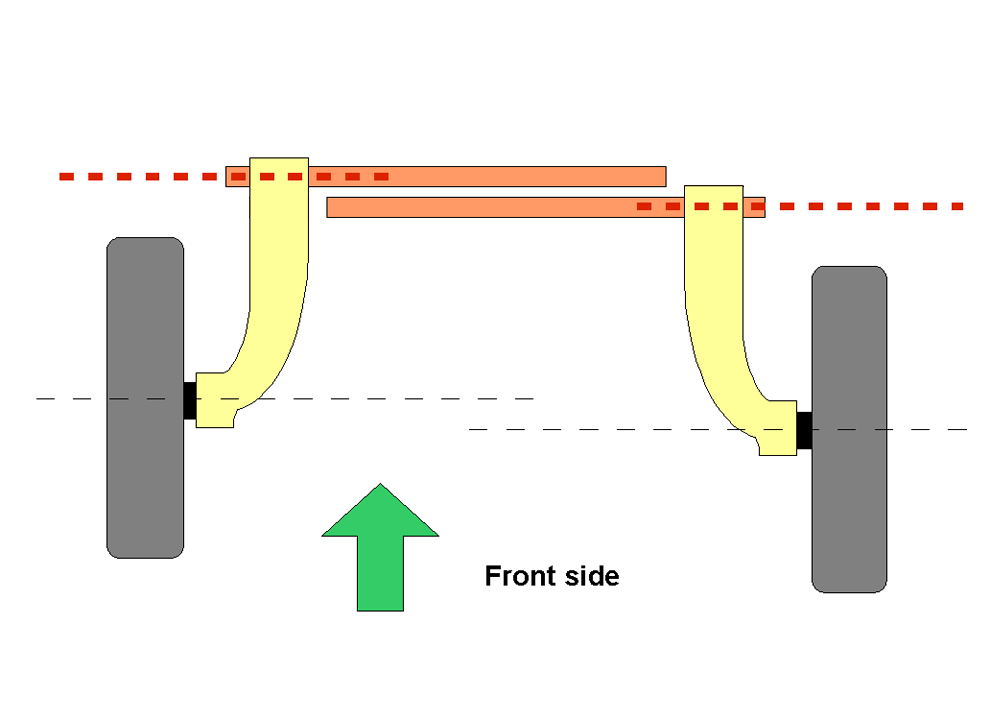
Because the rear torsion bars are located one behind the other, the wheelbase is longer on the right side than on the left.

The R3 and R4 had four-wheel torsion-bar independent suspension. This was an innovation that would be copied on a succession of subsequent front-engined Renaults introduced during the 1960s and 70s.

The car has a shorter wheelbase on the left than on the right because the rear wheels are not mounted directly opposite one another. This concept allowed a very simple design of the rear suspension using transverse torsion bars located one behind the other without affecting handling. The front torsion bars were longitudinal. The fixed end of the torsion bars is mounted on quadrants that can be adjusted via a holes/fixing bolt arrangement. This enables the suspension to be "beefed up" and the ground clearance increased. With specialist tools provided by Renault, adjustments can be made to provide the light 4L some off-road capabilities. This feature, along with the installation of a thick protecting aluminum plate under the engine, has been used by off-road drivers and student 4L Trophy entrants. Damping was provided by hydraulic telescopic shock absorbers on all four wheels. Those at the rear were mounted virtually horizontally which avoided the intrusion of rear suspension componentry into the flat-floored passenger cabin.

The longitudinal layout of the front-wheel drive engine and transmission with the engine behind the front axle, and gearbox/differential in front, is identical to that of the Citroën Traction Avant. The rear suspension is basically made like on the Citroën H, with transversally mounted torsion bars and independent trailing arms.

== Around the world ==
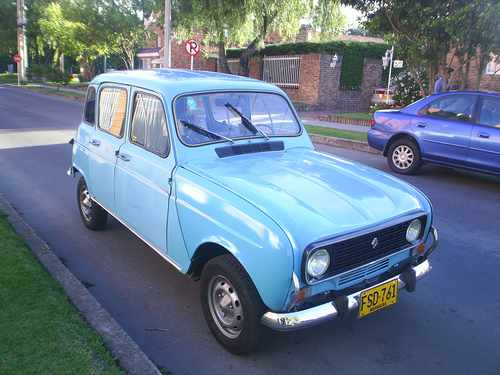
Renault 4R Plus 25 (in Colombia)

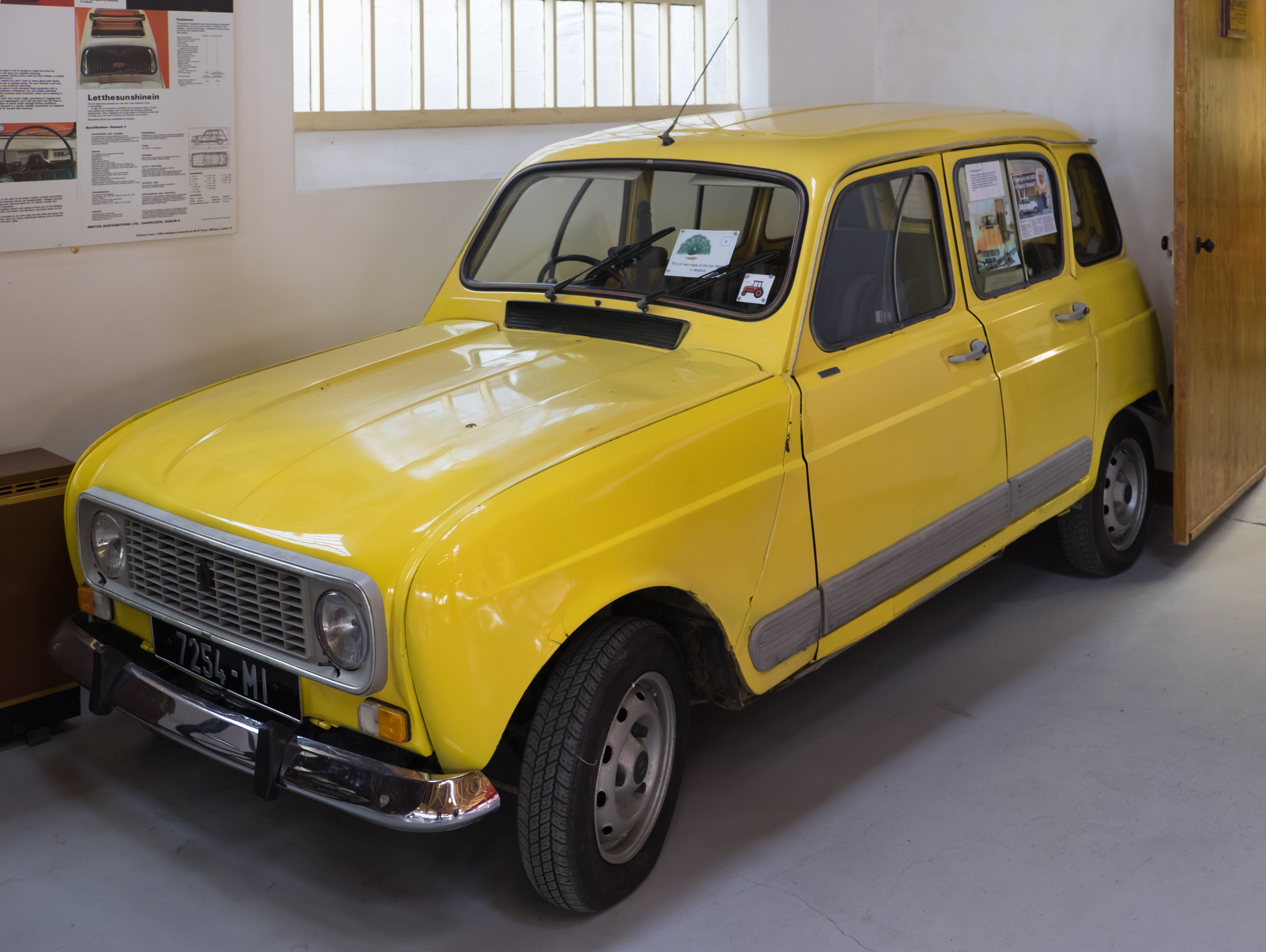
1982 Renault R4 GTL built in Wexford, Ireland

- In Colombia, the Renault 4 was one of the best selling vehicles. Many Colombians nicknamed it "Amigo fiel" (Faithful friend) due to its popularity. The vehicle was manufactured at the SOFASA plant in Envigado (Medellín) from 1970 to 1992. Two of the most popular versions included the Master (1,022 cc) and the Líder (Leader), which had a more powerful 1,300 cc engine. The first Renault 4 was actually called "Azul Pastrana", named after President Misael Pastrana inaugurated the Renault plant in Envigado, Colombia.
- In Argentina and Chile the 4 van (Fourgonette) is known as "Renoleta", following the nickname given to the Citroën 2CV van, "Citroneta". Due to heavy taxation on passenger vehicles in the late 1950s, the first 2CVs were imported unfinished, only up to the front doors and completed with an Argentine-made pickup truck bed. The Spanish word for pickup truck is "camioneta", hence "Renoleta".
- In Italy the 4 was produced by the Alfa Romeo factory in Milan under license from 1962 to 1964. 41,809 R4s were built there.
- In Australia the car was produced between 1962 and 1966 in Heidelberg, Victoria, but ceased production to make way for other models.
- In Bosnia and Herzegovina and Croatia the car was known as "Mali div" (Little giant) or "četvorka".
- In Finland, the car was known as "Tipparellu" (Drop Rellu) from the marketing slogan No grease, no water, just a drop of fuel and as it had excellent fuel economy. Rellu is the common nickname for Renault cars in Finland.
- In Mexico, the Renault 4 was produced in Ciudad Sahagún, an industrial city created by DINA and Renault in the fifties. Renault production ceased in 1976.
- In Ireland the car was first produced in a plant established in 1962 in Naas, and production was transferred to a new factory established in Wexford in 1972, production running until 1984.
- In Slovenia (formerly part of Yugoslavia) the Renault 4, nicknamed "Katrca" or "štirica" (from French quatre, four), was produced in the Industrija motornih vozil (IMV) plant from 1973 to 1992. 575,960 R4s were built there. In 1989 the plant was sold to Group Renault and renamed REVOZ d.d.
- In Portugal it had a CKD assembly line in Guarda from 1964 to 1989 where more than 190,000 units were assembled. It was known as "Quatro L" (four L) .
- In Spain the Renault 4L is known as "Cuatro latas" (four tins).
- In East Africa it became known as the "Roho". In Swahili Roho means spirit, soul or character perhaps reflecting the affection the vehicle gained.
- On 7 September 2013, Pope Francis accepted a white 1984 4L which had done 300,000 km (200,000 miles), offered to him by father Renzo Zocca from Verona.

== Design ==
The Renault 4 was a basic car with a simple dashboard and sliding windows. Suspension and seats were designed for comfort, and ventilation and the heater were effective.

The Renault 4 was not significantly changed during its production. Exterior chrome trim was eventually phased out on all models, and aluminium grilles were replaced with plastic. There were three different dashboard designs. On the right side of the car at the back the position of the fuel filler was raised by approximately 15 cm (6 in) less than a year after the car's launch; other than that, changes to the body panels were limited to a slightly altered hood and hinges.

Renault developed new small cars, the Renault 6 and the Renault 5, while the Renault 4 was still selling well. The Renault 5 competed in a somewhat different sector (three-and five-door supermini). The Renault 4 is intermediate between the small utility vehicle (2CV) and the supermini design (R5, Peugeot 205).

== Variants ==
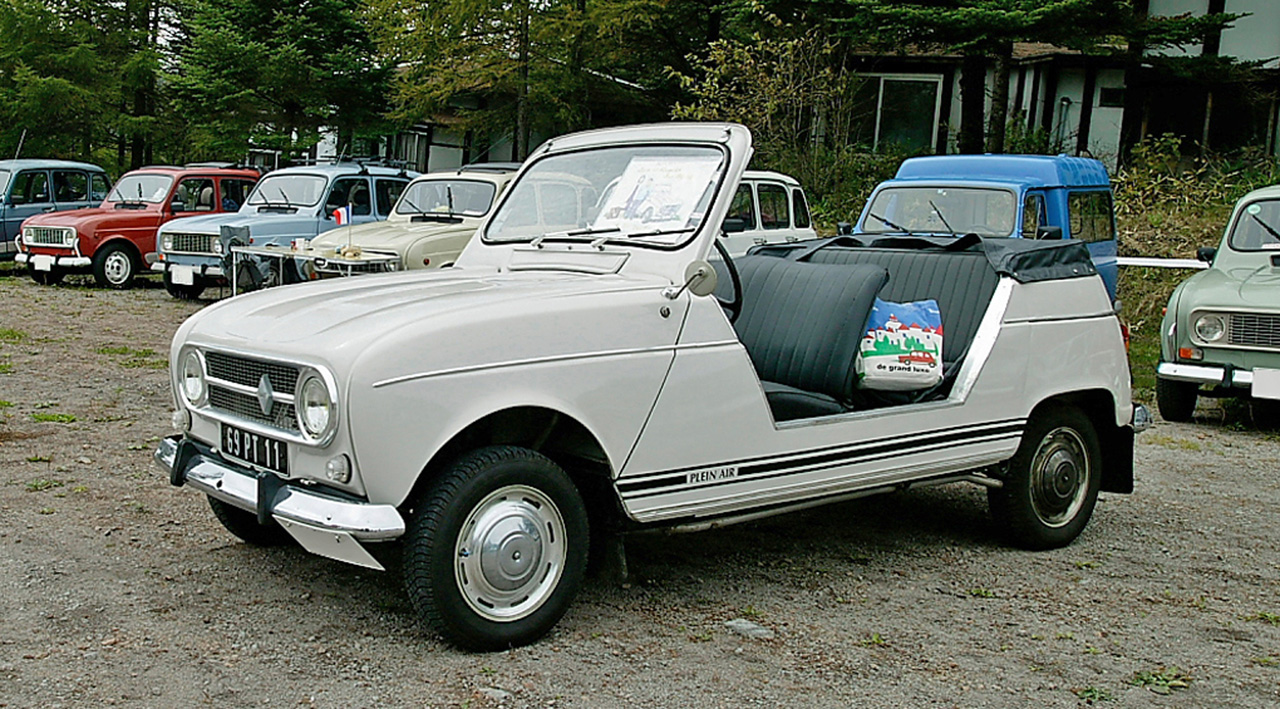
Plein-Air

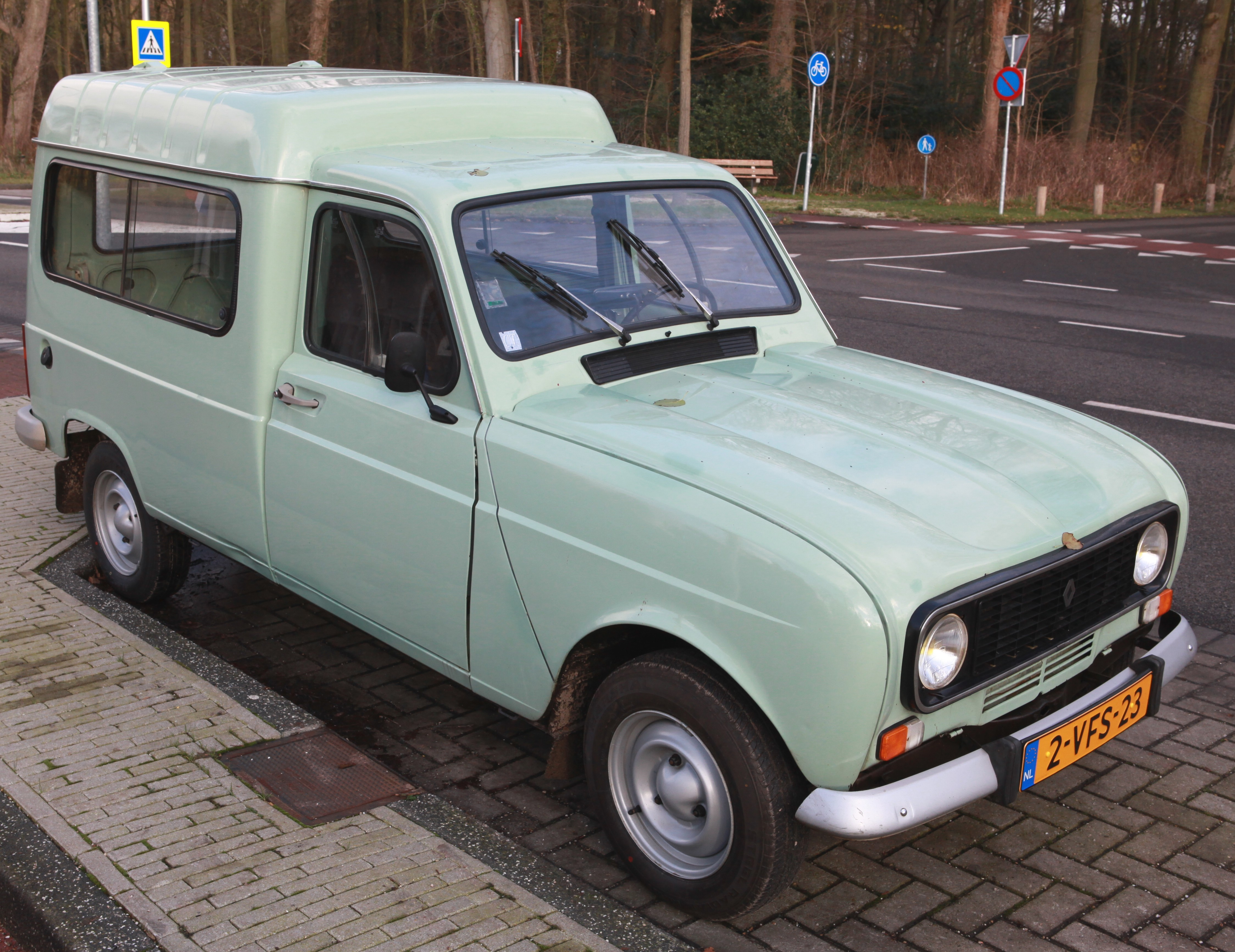
Renault 4 Fourgonnette (van)

There were many different 'special edition' Renault 4s. Some (including the Safari, Sixties, and Jogging) were sold in special colour schemes, upholstery and other details, while others (Clan, Savane) were standard models with special decals.

There were also special models that were not solely a marketing exercise, such as the Renault 4 Sinpar 4x4, the Plein Air, a pickup truck, LPG versions, and electric versions.

The Plein Air was a doorless and roofless version originally developed to meet a 1964 request by the French Army. Sinpar's version, called the Sinpar 4x4 Torpedo, was first shown as a prototype at the 1968 Geneva Salon, equipped with Sinpar's four-wheel-drive system. Sinpar was quickly given a contract to build a front-wheel-drive version at their works in Colombes near Paris; it appeared in May 1968. Called the Plein Air (meaning "Open Air"), it had no doors, with only a chain protecting the passengers. A military contract did not materialize but Renault and Sinpar attempted to ride the late sixties/early seventies buggy wave in marketing it as a fun beach car. Being more expensive and less capable than the Citroën Méhari it did not catch on and was discontinued in March 1970, after only 563 had been built. In 1989, Colombian SOFASA produced the variants Brisa (Breeze) which was based on the French Plein Air and Jogging, which was marketed as a sportier version of the car and featured red accessories.

In 1978, the R4 GTL arrived. It had the 1108 cc engine from the Renault 6 TL, albeit with the performance reduced for better economy, and bigger drum brakes. The GTL was identifiable by its grey front grille, grey bumpers, and grey plastic strips along the bottoms of the doors. It also had an extra air intake below the front grille (as a result, the registration plate was moved down to the bumper), and 12 inch (304.8 mm) wiper blades instead of the original 10 inch (254 mm) ones. For the 1983 model year, the GTL got front disc brakes, the handbrake now working on the rear wheels, and there were a modified dashboard and cloth seats. The Renault 4 was the last French automobile to be sold with drum brakes on all four wheels, after the Citroën 2CV received disc brakes in 1981. The very first 1983 models had the handbrake lever moved from left to right under the steering wheel before it was moved to the floor like in almost any other car by then.

There was also a panel van (Fourgonnette) version of the R4, which with its "high cube" bodyshell and the unique 'giraffon' (giraffe hatch) at the rear became the idiosyncratic French "Boulangerie" van. For many years, this was a successful vehicle of its type and for many customers, as it represents their idea of a Renault 4 more than a passenger version. It remained on sale in Europe until 1993 and was replaced by the Renault Express (called Extra in UK and Ireland, Rapid in Germany), which was based on the second generation Renault 5 'Supercinq'.

== End of the R4 ==
Though reasons such as emissions and safety legislation are often given for the Renault 4's demise in Europe during the 1980s, it would appear that its popularity would not have lasted. Outmoded production methods, more advanced competition and the reasons outlined above meant that the Renault 4's days were numbered, at least as a mainstream product. And Renault was already enjoying huge sales success with the far more modern R5, which was only slightly more expensive. Comparable products had already been discontinued in Europe or had their production scaled back, as more modern designs enjoyed the strongest sales. British Leyland's Mini had been produced in smaller figures since the launch of the Austin Metro in 1980 with production continuing until 2000. Volkswagen had switched Beetle production from West Germany to Mexico in 1978 (where it was made until 2003), with the new Polo and Golf proving hugely popular in Europe. Citroën kept its 2CV in production until 1990, but did not directly replace it, with the AX (launched in 1986) taking its place as the entry-level model in the Citroën range. It had also produced the earlier Dyane and Visa as more modern and only marginally more expensive alternatives to 2CV.

There were several projects to replace the Renault 4, starting from the early 1970s. However, the continuing success of the Renault 4, the need to replace the more popular Renault 5 during the early 1980s, the difficulties coming up with a suitable replacement (and the idea that the Renault 4's market would die with it) all meant that a new entry-level Renault (the Twingo) did not appear until 1992. To conclude production, a series of 1000 examples marketed as "Bye-Bye" was released, each with a numbered plaque.

To mark the end of Renault 4 production, a retrospective series of ten black-and-white photographs by Thierry des Ouches was published in Libération in early December 1992, when R4 production finally finished after 31 years. This series later won first prize from Le Club des Directeur Artistiques in the category of daily newspaper. It was also awarded the Lion d'Or at the Cannes Lions International Advertising Festival.

In 2003, a Japanese car modification company called DAMD came up with a design called the Ancel Lapin which could transform a first-generation Suzuki Lapin into a Renault 4 lookalike.

== Name reuse (2025) ==
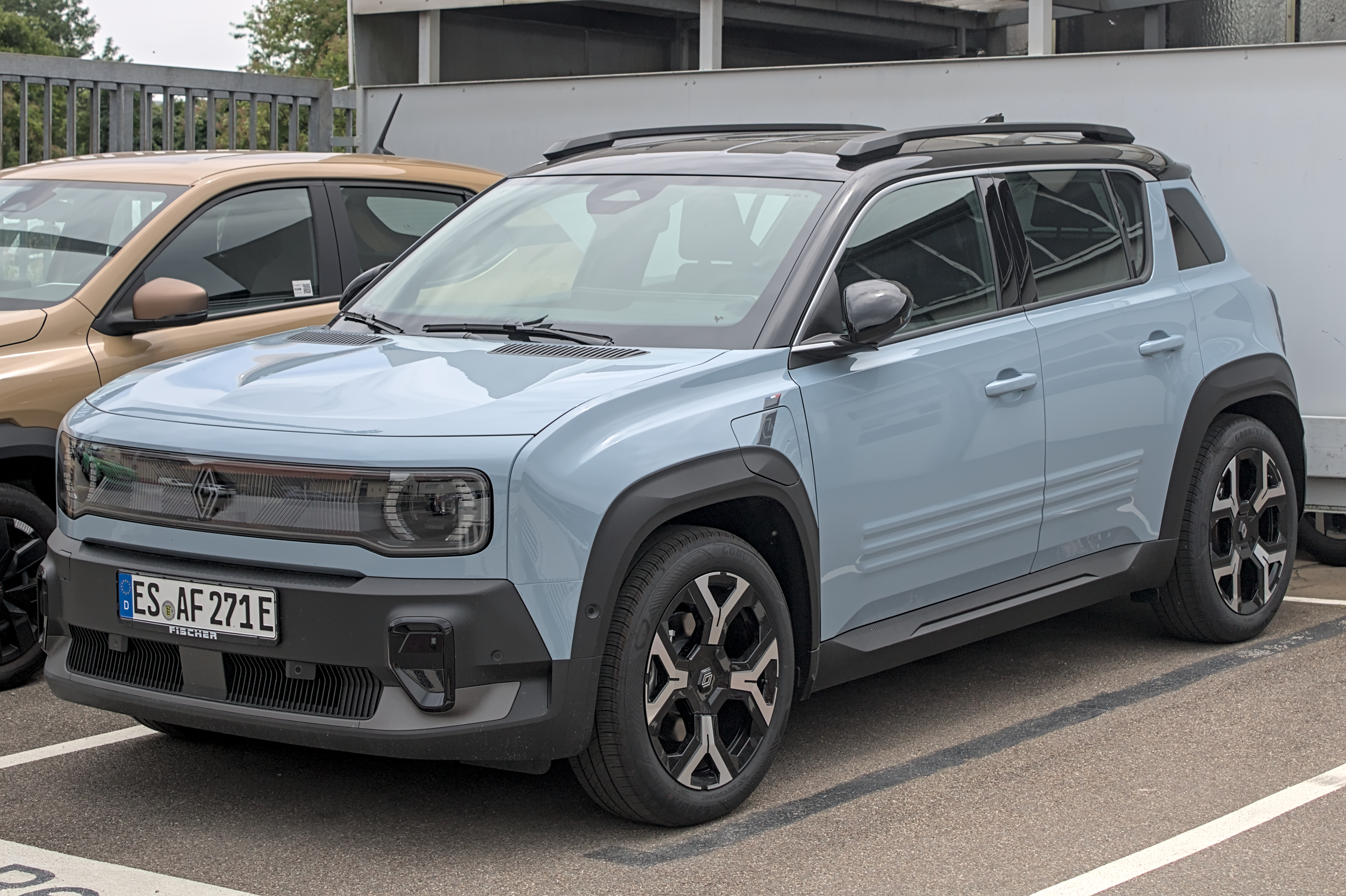
Renault 4 E-Tech

In 2021, it was announced that a namesake of the Renault 4 would be introduced during the 2020s as the "4ever", a compact crossover cousin of the forthcoming all-electric Renault 5 E-Tech. It would be built alongside the 5 EV at Renault ElectriCity, a union of three existing Renault factories in northern France that was planned to produce 400,000 EVs per year by 2025. The 4ever is based on the same CMF-B EV platform as the 5 EV; because the platform shares 1/2 of its components with the existing CMF-B platform, production costs are expected to be 2/3 of those for the current Zoe.

== In motorsport ==
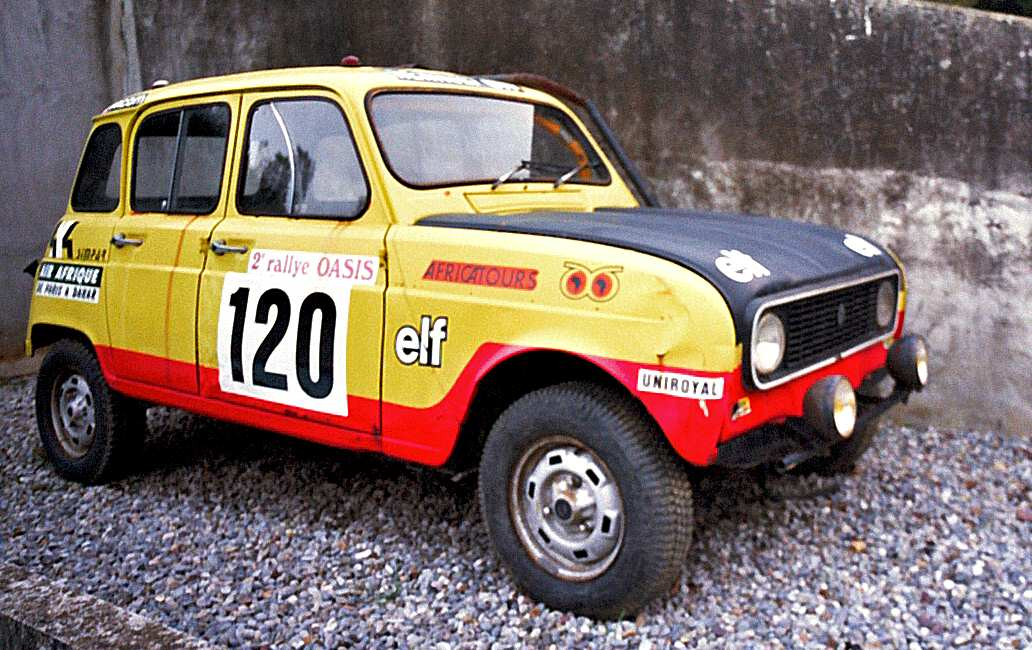
Renault 4 Sinpar from the Paris–Dakar Rally

The Renault 4 was originally powered by a 24 hp (18 kW) engine and its suspension were never intended for sporting dynamics. The Renault 4 had certain advantages in its high torque and a suspension and ground-clearance that gave it go-anywhere capabilities. This meant that Renault was able to give it a sporting image with programs such as the "Cross Elf Cup of France" in 1974 and the "Routes du Monde" program in 1968. The latter was a project in which Renault would lend young people cars to travel the world in, and this would help to give the Renault 4 an adventurous and durable image. The "Coupe de France Renault Cross Elf" was a series of races in France on dirt tracks with slightly tuned 782 cc R4s.

A Renault 4 Sinpar (the four-wheel drive version) was entered in the Paris-Dakar Rally in 1979 and 1980 by Bernard and Claude Marreau, coming fifth in 1979 and in third in 1980. Renault 4 continued to feature in many long distance rallies after production ceased, such as in 2001 in the London–Sahara–London rally (Renault 4 GTL) and the 2008 Mongol Rally. The Renault 4 forms the basis of the 4L Trophy, an annual rally established in 1997 for students who collect sponsorship and drive to the Sahara to deliver educational materials to children of the desert and of Morocco.

The Renault 4 GTL was homologated in Group A. Jacky Cesbron raced one in the Monte Carlo Rally in 1993 and the Tour de Corse in 1991. Pinto dos Santos raced a Group N 4 GTL in visiting every round of the WRC though not all during the same season. To celebrate the car's 50th birthday, Renault entered the R4 in the Monte Carlo Rally in 2011.

Standard Renault 4s has taken part in a drag race at Santa Pod Raceway, Northamptonshire since 2004, and covered the quarter mile in 21.438 seconds with a terminal speed of 59.14 mph.
