= DRK =

DRK may refer to:

- The German Red Cross, or Deutsches Rotes Kreuz
- Drake Bay Airport (IATA code: DRK), Drake Bay, Costa Rica
- Dash (cryptocurrency), whose previous name (Darkcoin) had the symbol "DRK"
- DRK (car), produced from 1987 to 1998
- North Korea, UNDP code
