= Kiep =

Kiep is a surname. Notable people with the surname include:

- Hanna Kiep (1904–1979), German diplomat and jurist
- Otto Kiep (1886–1944), German civil servant
- Walther Leisler Kiep (1926–2016), German politician
