= Hanna Kiep =

Hanna Kiep (February 10, 1904, in Braunschweig⁣ – August 22, 1979, in Pullach) was a German lawyer, diplomat, and functionary of the German Red Cross (DRC).

In 1946, she became a member of the DRK executive board, working for the World Organization of Mothers of All Nations and the German Housewives Association. After the founding of the Federal Republic of Germany, she joined the diplomatic service in 1949 and from 1951 to 1969 was a women's secretary at the German Consulate General in New York.
