= FASA-Renault =

FASA-Renault was a Spanish automobile manufacturer which produced Renault and Renault-based vehicles from 1951 to 2000. Since 2000 until the present, its factories are part of Renault España.

== History ==
The company was established in 1951 in Valladolid as FASA (Fabricación de Automóviles Sociedad Anónima de Valladolid) by Spanish interests, a license having been obtained to allow local production of Renault vehicles. In 1965 Renault increased its shareholding in the company from 15% to 49.9% and the company name was changed to FASA-Renault. Renault was permitted to become a major shareholder in the company in 1976 and by December 2000 FASA-Renault was fully owned by the Renault Group.

=== The Renault Group ===
Most of the Renault range was assembled in Spain (Valladolid and Palencia), excluding the bigger cars like the 20/30 and 25. The Renault 7 which was produced by FASA-Renault from 1974 to 1984 is a locally developed four-door sedan version of the original Renault 5 hatchback.

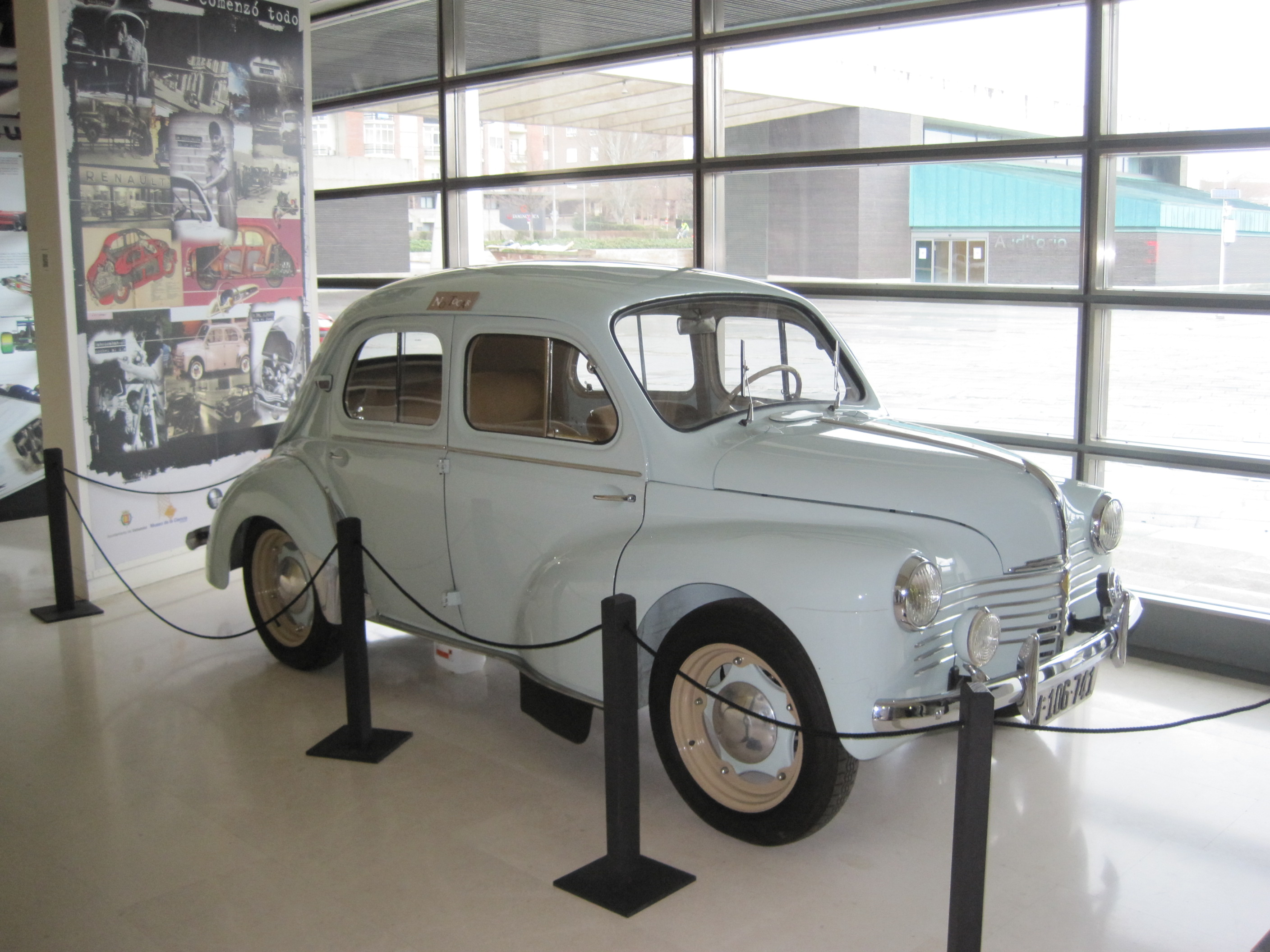
The first Renault 4CV manufactured by FASA-Renault at the factory of Valladolid. The factory was opened in 1951, resulting in a sharp growth in the industrial area.

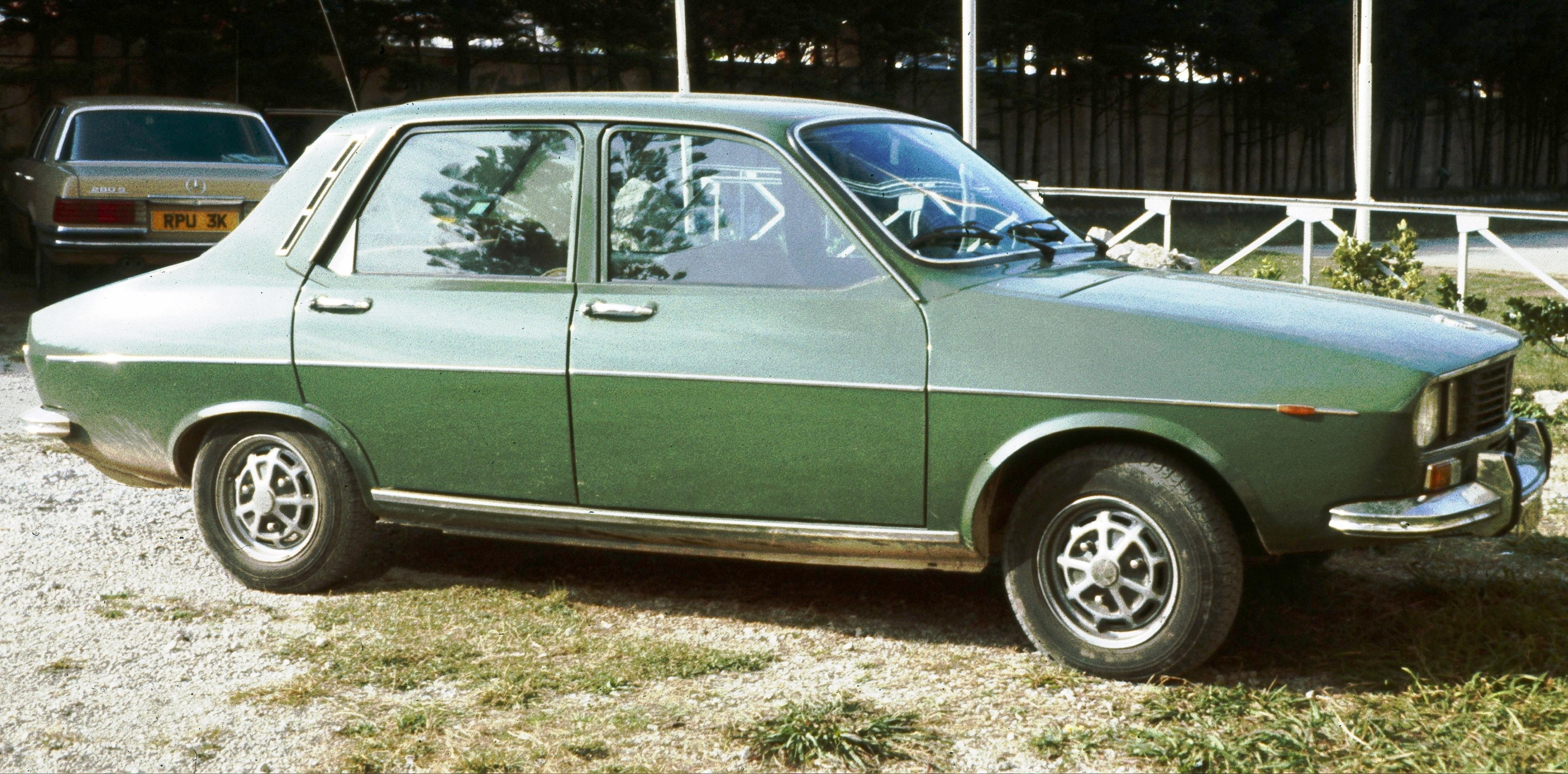
Fasa-Renault 12 S of 1972.

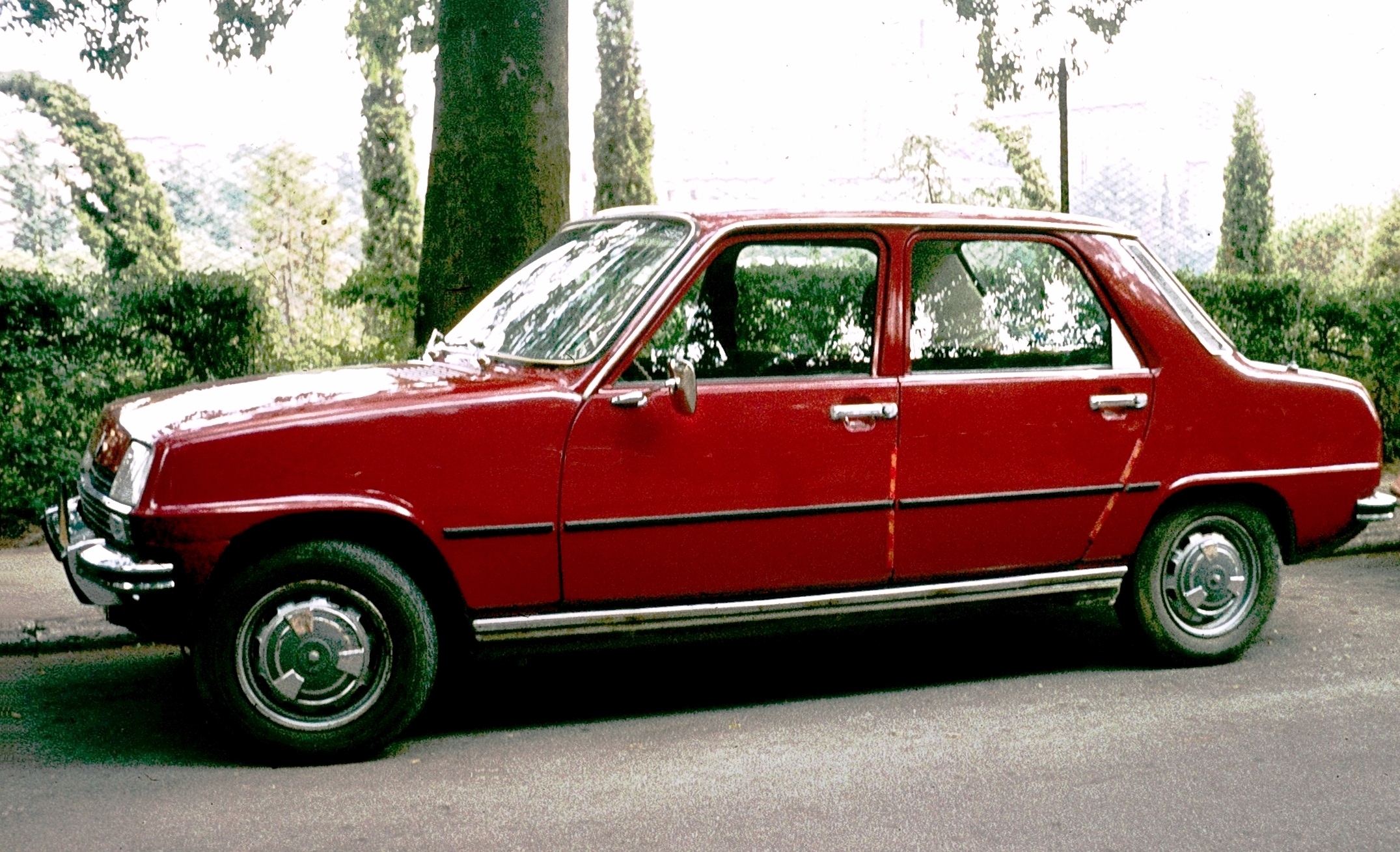
Renault 7 is a 4-door saloon version of the Renault 5 supermini.

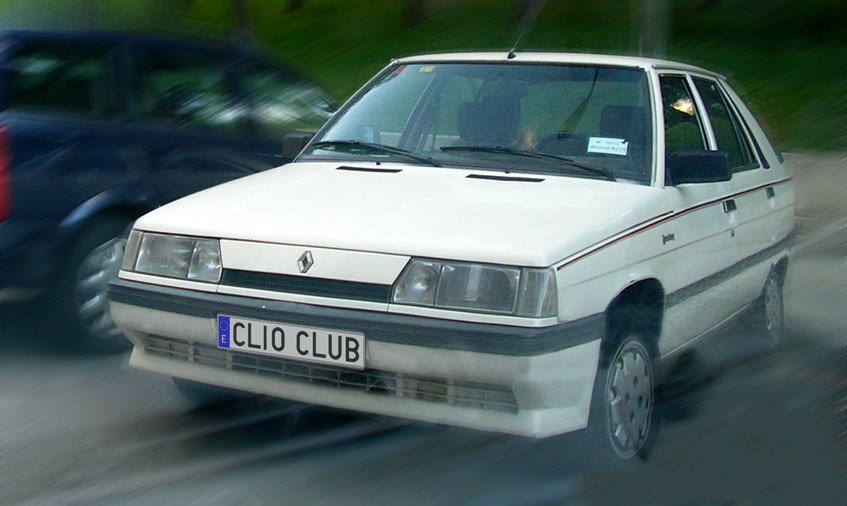
Renault 11 (1981-1989).

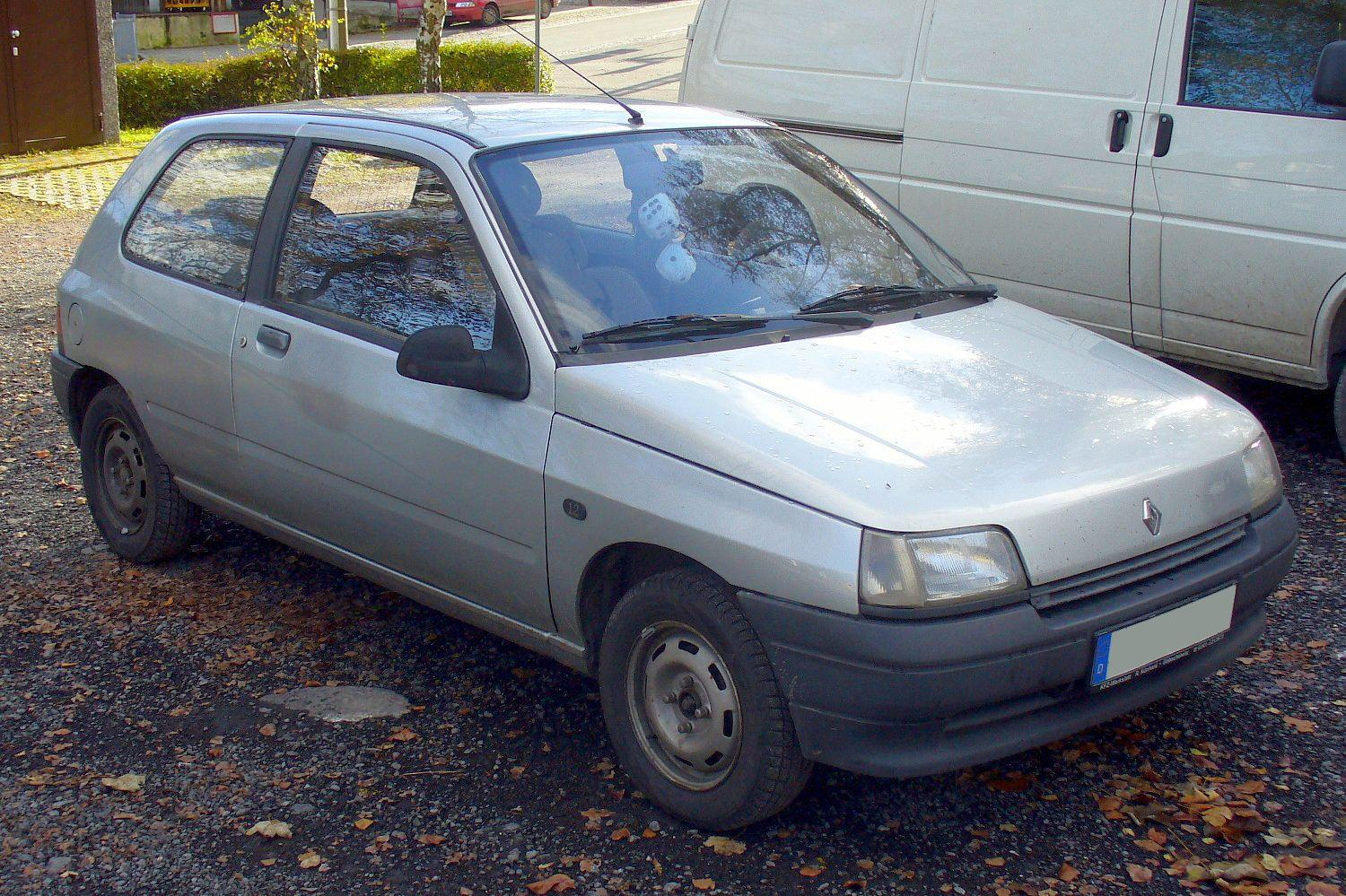
Renault Clio (1990-2014).

== See also ==
- Bulgarrenault
- MAVA-Renault
- Oyak-Renault
- Oltcit
- Polski Fiat
