= Renault 7 =

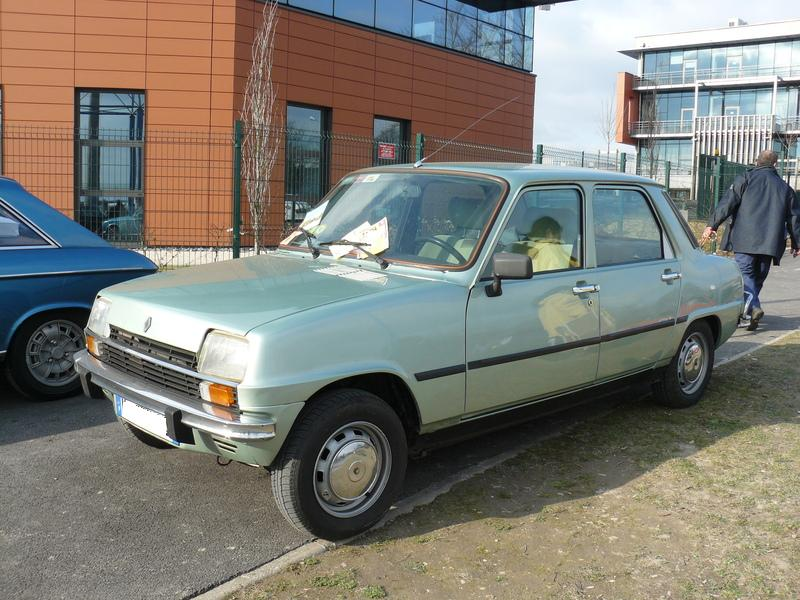

Overview
- Manufacturer: Renault
- Also called: Renault Siete
- Production: 1974–1984
- Assembly: Spain: Valladolid (FASA-Renault)

Body and chassis
- Class: Supermini
- Body style: 4-door saloon
- Layout: MF layout
- Related: Renault 5

Powertrain
- Engine: 1.0 L (1037 cc) I4; 1.1 L (1108 cc) I4

Dimensions
- Wheelbase: 2,505 mm (98.6 in) (right); 2,535 mm (99.8 in) (left)
- Length: 3,890 mm (153.1 in)
- Width: 1,525 mm (60.0 in)
- Height: 1,400 mm (55.1 in)
- Curb weight: 815 kg (1,797 lb)

Chronology
- Predecessor: None
- Successor: Renault Clio/ Renault 9

The Renault Siete (from 1979: "Renault 7") is a 4-door saloon version of the Renault 5 supermini, produced and sold in Spain by Renault's subsidiary, FASA-Renault in Valladolid, from 1974 to 1984.

It was very similar to the Renault 5 hatchback (which had been launched two years earlier), and identical mechanically, but offered with a smaller range of engines. The Siete had four doors and a saloon-style boot in place of the original car's three (and later five) doors including hatchback. This involved extending the wheelbase by just under 6 cm (2.4 in) though it retained the wheelbase difference between left and right sides, characteristic of several Renault models, resulting from the use of full-width torsion bars placed one behind the other, ahead of the rear wheels. The Siete's boot volume was 400 dm^{3} (14 cu ft), the Renault 5 had a 270 dm^{3} (9.5 cu ft) trunk.

Another difference between the Renault Siete and the 5 was the use, on the 7, of 'conventional' chromed metal bumpers instead of off-body colour plastic ones, giving the car a more refined appearance. The dashboard and other interior details were of a different design than in the French hatchback equivalent. Initially powered by a 1037 cc engine (an enlarged version of the 956 cc Renault 5 engine) producing 50 PS (37 kW; 49 hp), it was mostly sold in Spain.

Over the years the Siete had small annual updates. In 1979, it was more extensively restyled and amongst others received a new interior and rear lights. On that occasion the name changed to Renault 7 (Siete is Spanish for 7). An engine upgrade to 1108 cc followed in 1980. Claimed maximum power did drop to 45 PS (33 kW; 44 hp), but torque went up from 7.4 kg⋅m (73 N⋅m) at 3000 rpm to 8.0 kg⋅m (78 N⋅m) at 2000 rpm. A five-door version of the Renault 5 was launched in 1980 using the door pattern of the Spanish Renault 7.

Production ended in 1984, after the Renault 9 & 11 had entered the worldwide market and the Renault 5 had been substantially redesigned as the Supercinq (now based on the Renault 9/11 floorpan). The Renault 7's success outside its home market was limited because Renault offered the larger Renault 12 for a small price premium, and its mainly Spanish sales did not justify the investment necessary to develop a new saloon version based on the Supercinq. A total 159,533 units were produced.

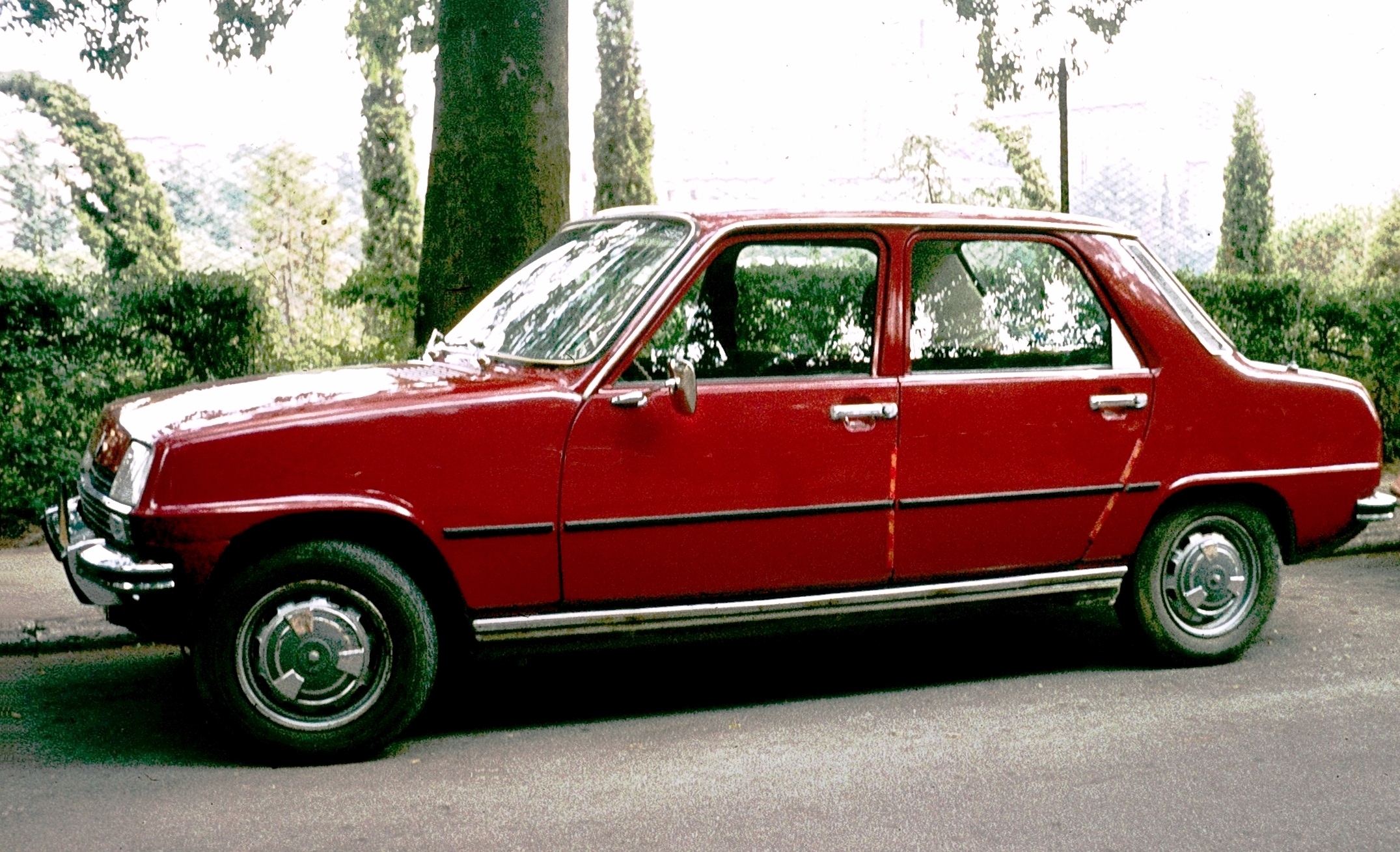
Renault 7

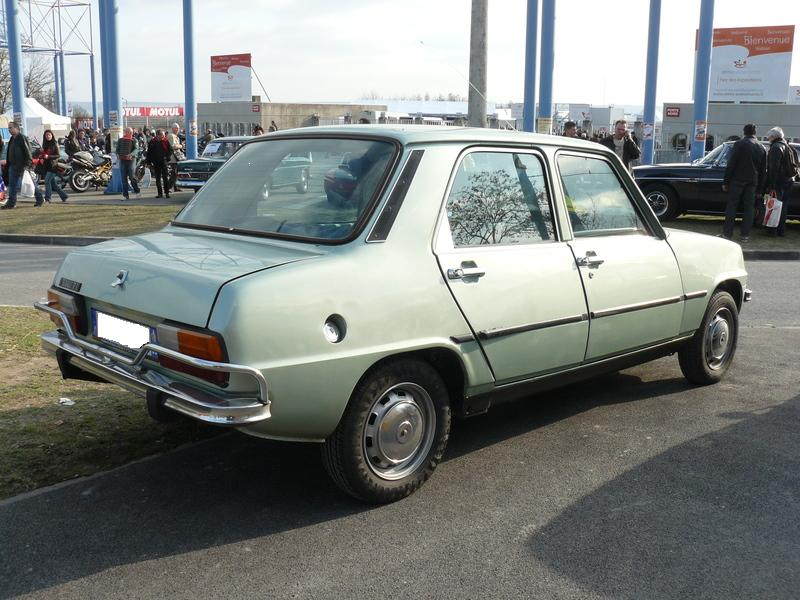
Renault 7 rear
