= DRK (car) =

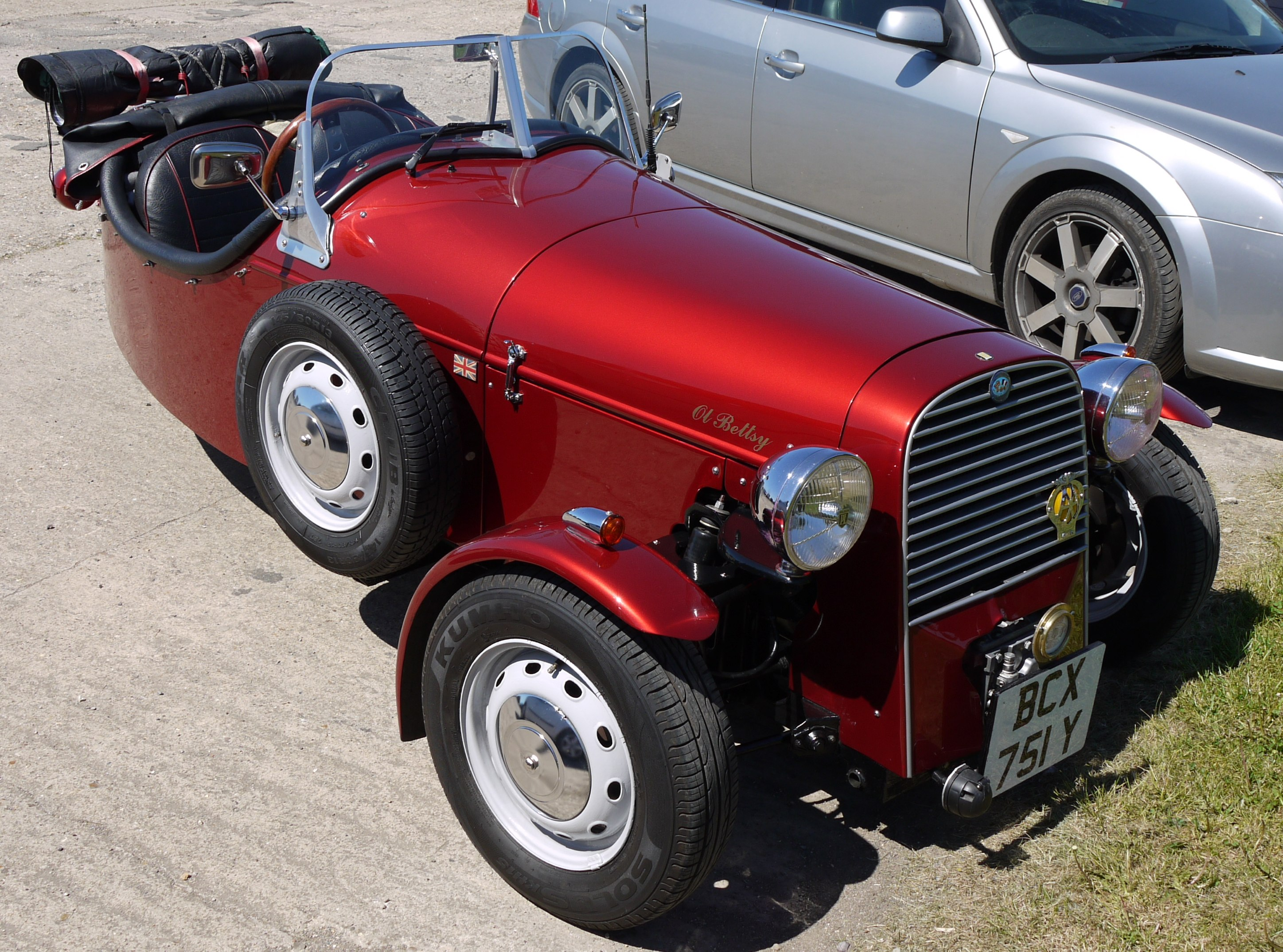

Overview
- Production: 1987–98
- Designer: Derek Callister; Robert Callister; Keith Hamer

Powertrain
- Engine: 845 cc – 1300 cc turbo

The DRK is a three-wheeled kit car produced by DRK Kits of Ellesmere Port, England, between 1987 and 1998. The car was introduced at the Cheshire Kit Car show in May 1986, where its positive reception prompted the formation of the company to build it. (Note: The name DRK is derived from the first names of the three designers of the car: Derek Callister, Robert Callister and Keith Hamer.)

The car has a two front wheels, one rear wheel configuration, with front-wheel drive. Its wooden body is encased in 20 swg aluminium, secured to a steel chassis. The mechanical components needed to complete the DRK could come from a Renault 4, 5 or 6, which gave a choice of engines from 845 cc (51.6 cu in) to 1300 cc (79 cu in) turbo. Kits were available from about £2400, but most customers had the mechanical components fitted by the factory.

In 1990 DRK Kits was sold to a firm of body repairers, Callister & Roscoe; until then building the cars had been a part-time hobby for its designers. Derek and Robert Callister became full-time partners in the new venture, building customised DRKs to order. The Callister brothers decided to retire in 1998 and production ended, by which time 59 cars had been built.
