= Renault 5 =

Hatchback car (1972–1996)

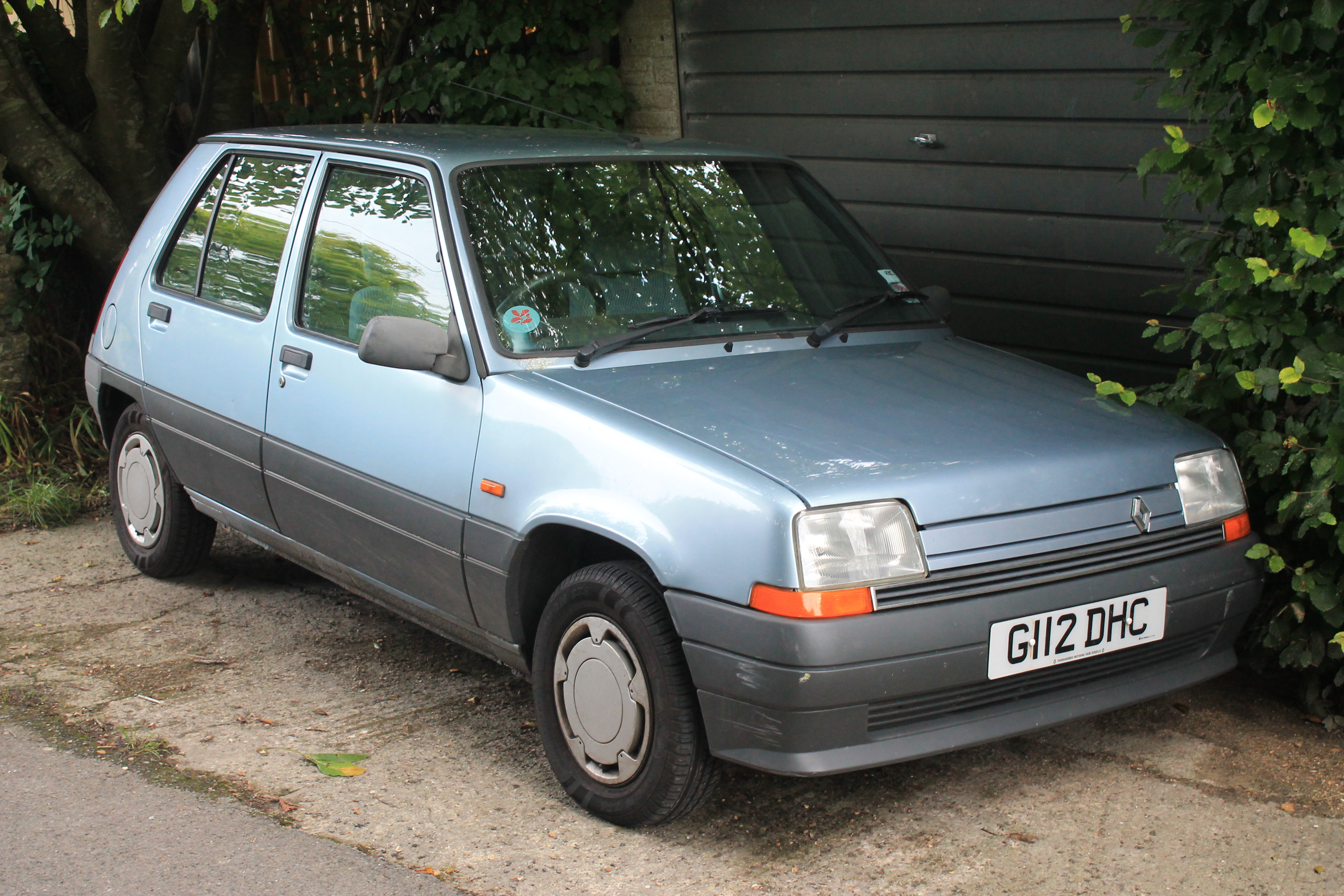
- Second generation R5

Overview
- Manufacturer: Renault
- Production: 1972–1996

Body and chassis
- Class: Supermini (B)

Chronology
- Successor: Renault Clio; Renault Twingo

The Renault 5 is a supermini car produced by the French manufacturer Renault from 1972 to 1996 over two generations. It is a hatchback with either three or five doors and seating for five passengers. The first generation (also known as the R5 or Le Car), which was made from 1972 to 1985, has a front mid-engine, front-wheel-drive layout. The second generation (also known as the Super 5 or Supercinq), which was produced from 1984 to 1996, has a front-engine, front-wheel-drive layout.

The R5 was marketed in the United States and Canada as Le Car, from 1976 until 1983. Renault marketed a four-door saloon car variant, the Renault 7, manufactured from 1974 until 1984 in Spain by Renault's subsidiary FASA-Renault and exported to select markets.

The Renault 5 became the best-selling car in France from 1972 until 1986, with a total production exceeding 5.5 million over 14 years, making it France's most popular car.

== First generation (1972–1985) ==
Renault 5 (first generation)
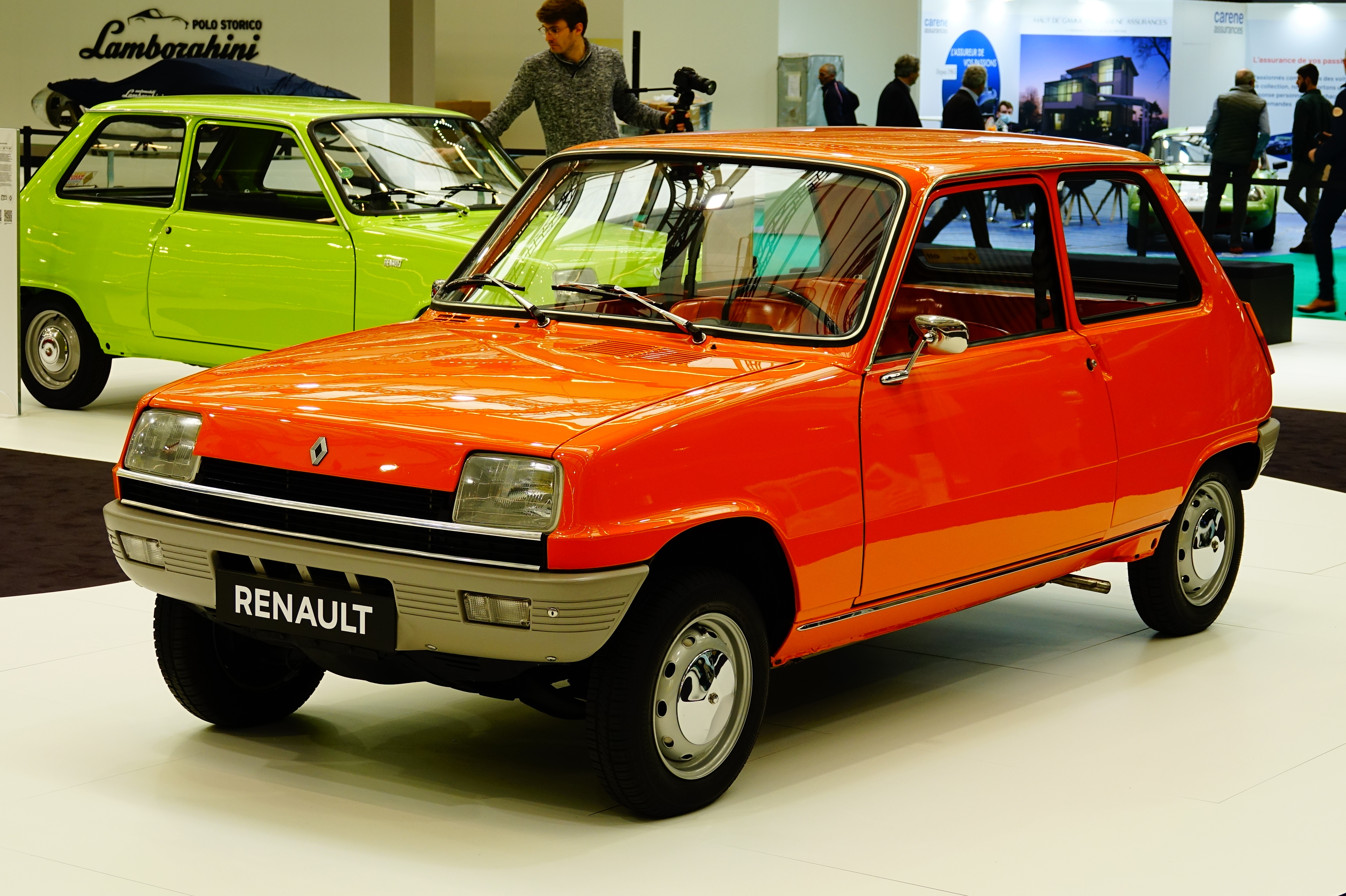
- First generation R5, front view

Overview
- Also called: Renault Le Car (USA and Canada); Lectric Leopard (USA); Pars Khodro Sepand (Iran)
- Production: 1972–1985
- Assembly: France: Flins; France: Dieppe (Alpine); France: Douai; Spain: Valladolid (FASA-Renault); Venezuela: Mariara; Iran: Tehran (SAIPA/Pars Khodro); Mexico: Ciudad Sahagún; South Africa: Durban (Motor Assemblies); Yugoslavia: Novo Mesto (IMV)
- Designer: Michel Boué

Body and chassis
- Body style: 3/5-door hatchback
- Layout: FMF layout
- Related: Renault 4; Renault 7; Renault Rodeo; Pars Khodro PK

Powertrain
- Engine: 782 cc Ventoux I4; 845 cc Ventoux I4; 956 cc C1C I4; 1108 cc C1E I4; 1289 cc 810 I4; 1397 cc C1J I4; 1397 cc C6J turbo I4
- Transmission: 4/5-speed manual 3-speed automatic

Dimensions
- Wheelbase: 2,419 mm (95.2 in)
- Length: 3,521 mm (138.6 in)
- Width: 1,525 mm (60.0 in)
- Height: 1,410 mm (55.5 in)
- Kerb weight: 730–810 kg (1,609–1,786 lb)

The first images and details of the Renault 5 were published on 10 December 1971, and the car's formal launch followed on 28 January 1972.

The Renault 5 was styled by Michel Boué, who designed the car in his spare time, outside of his regular duties. When Renault executives learned of Boué's work, they were so impressed by his concept that they immediately authorized a formal development program. The R5 featured a steeply sloping rear hatchback. Boué had wanted the tail-lights to go all the way up from the bumper into the C-pillar, in the fashion of the much later Fiat Punto and Volvo 850 estate, but the lights remained at a more conventional level.

It was launched onto the right-hand drive U.K. market in the autumn of 1972, where alongside the recently launched Fiat 127 it competed as an imported but more modern alternative to British Leyland's Mini and Chrysler Europe's Hillman Imp — and without competitors from Ford or Vauxhall.

The Renault 5 narrowly missed out on the 1973 European Car of the Year award, which was instead given to the Audi 80.

Boué died of cancer at the end of 1972, just a few months after the car he designed was launched.

The R5 borrowed mechanicals from the successful Renault 4, using a longitudinally-mounted engine driving the front wheels with torsion bar suspension. OHV engines were the same as the Renault 4 and larger Renault 8. At the car's launch, the 782 cc and 956 cc versions were available depending on the model level. A "5TS/5LS" with the 1,289 cc engine from the Renault 12 was added from April 1974. As on the Renault 4, entry-level Renault 5s had their engine sizes increased to 845 cc in 1976, and at the top of the range, later models included the 1,397 cc version.

It was one of the first modern superminis, which capitalized on the new hatchback layout which Renault had pioneered on its 1961 Renault 4, and had expanded to its mid-range Renault 16 of 1965. The R5 was launched a year after the Datsun 100A arrived in the UK; and after the initial, booted fastback version of the Fiat 127 (during the year, the 127 became available with a hatchback). However, the R5 was launched three years before the Volkswagen Polo and Vauxhall Chevette, and four years before the Ford Fiesta – new superminis which met the growing demand for this type of car in Western Europe. British Leyland was working on a new modern supermini during the 1970s, but the end product — the Austin Metro — was not launched until 1980. It was also introduced six months before the Honda Civic, which appeared later in July 1972, and one year before the Toyota Starlet.

Sales in Japan began in 1976, when both the two-door and four-door were available at Capital Car Dealerships. It was called the "Renault Go" as that is the Japanese word for "five". While initially sold with North American spec emissions equipment, it was changed to a French emissions package. The car was initially sold as left-hand drive, then changed to right-hand drive. The early Japanese 5s also used the North American Le Car's larger bumpers and different grille, incorporating round headlamps.

Although the mechanical components came from earlier models, body construction involved floor sections welded together with the other body panels, resulting in a monocoque structure. The approach had by then become mainstream among many European automakers, but represented an advance on the mechanically similar Renault 4 and Renault 6, both of which used a separate platform. The monocoque structure reduced the car's weight, but required investment in new production processes.

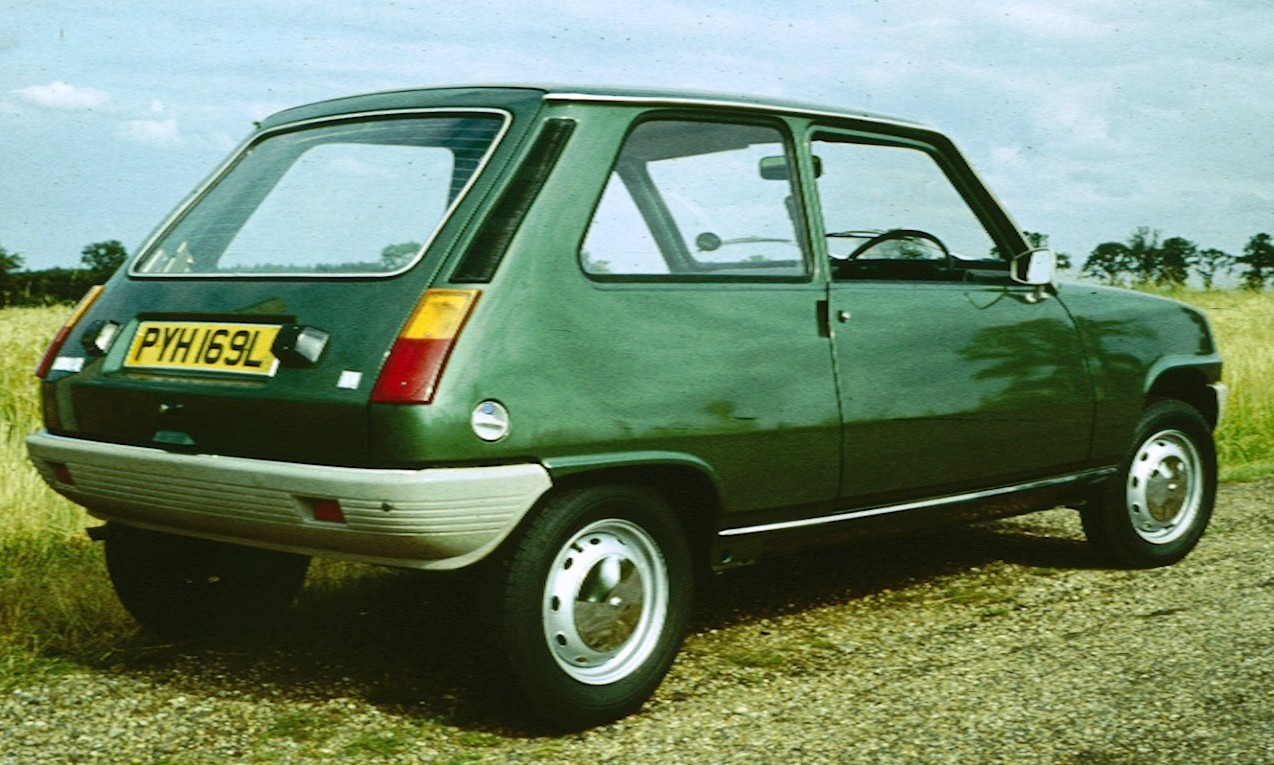
First generation, three door

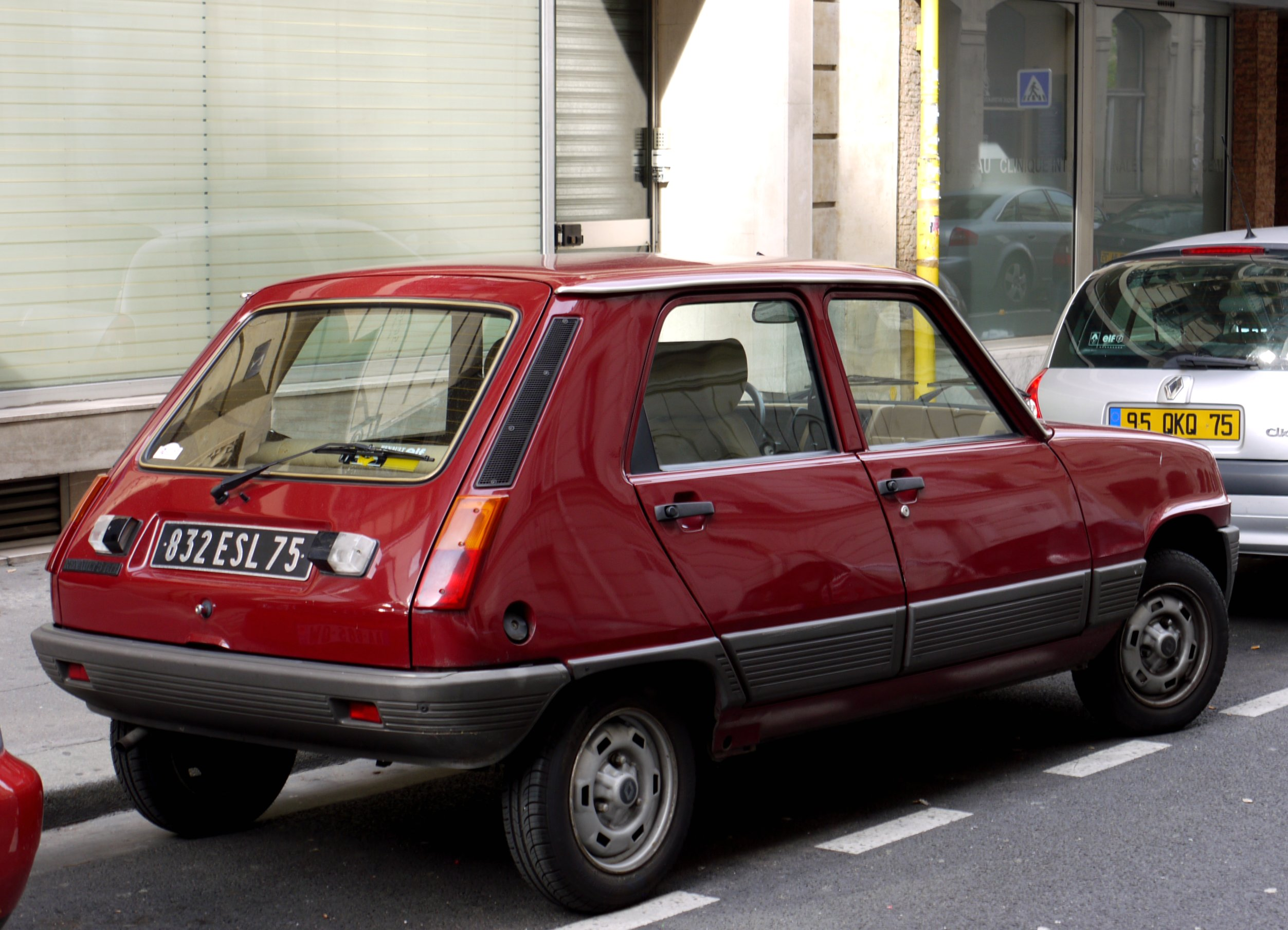
First generation, five doors: the five-door hatchback was added to the range in July 1979

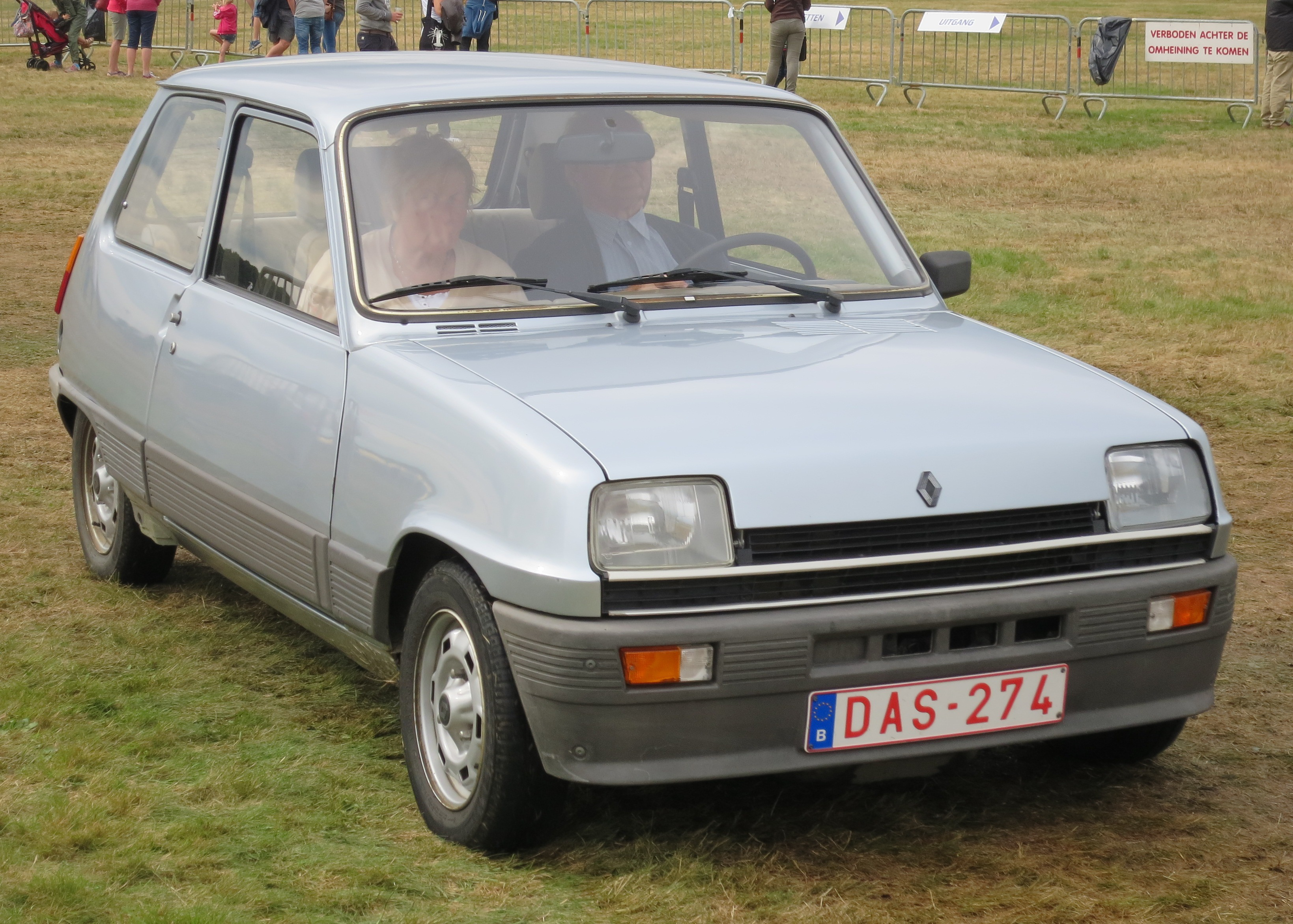
The GTL version, added in 1976, featured a 1,289cc engine tuned for economy rather than performance. The 5 GTL was distinguished from earlier versions by thick polyester protection panels along the sides.

The Renault 5 was targeted at cost-conscious customers, and the entry-level "L" version included the same 782 cc engine as the Renault 4 and drum brakes on all four wheels. In 1972, it was priced in France at below 10,000 francs. However, for many export markets, the entry-level version was excluded from the range, and front-wheel disc brakes were offered on the more powerful 956 cc "Renault 5TL" along with features as an alternator and reclining backrests for the front seats. From outside, the "TL" was differentiated from the "L" by a thin chrome strip below the doors.

The early production R5 used a dashboard-mounted gearshift like the Renault 4. It was linked by a rod that ran over the top of the engine to a single bend turning downwards; there it connected to a stick that came out of the gearbox, which was positioned directly in front of the engine. A floor-mounted lever employing a cable linkage replaced this arrangement in 1973. An automatic version, with the larger 1,289 cc engine, was added in early 1978. At the time, automatic cars usually represented just under five percent of the Renault 5 production. Door handles were formed by a cut-out in the side panel at the B-pillar just behind the front door, through which one could grab behind the door panel while pushing the button on it. The R5 was one of the first cars produced with plastic (polyester and fiberglass) bumpers, which came from a specialist Renault factory at Dreux. These covered a larger area of potential contact than conventional car bumpers of the time and survived low-speed parking shunts without permanently distorting. This helped the car gain a reputation as an "outstanding city car," and bumpers of this type subsequently became an industry standard.

The R5's engine was set well back in the engine bay behind the gearbox. The passenger compartment "is remarkably spacious". The Renault 5 body's drag coefficient was only 0.37 (with most European cars going up to 0.45).

Other versions of the first generation included the four-door saloon version called the Renault 7 built by FASA-Renault of Spain, where virtually all examples were sold. A five-door R5 was added to the range in 1979. The three-speed automatic transmission model, which received equipment similar to the R5 GTL, but with a 1,289 cc engine rated at 55 bhp (41 kW; 56 PS), a vinyl roof, and the TS' front seats, and also became available with five-door bodywork. In March 1981, the automatic received the 1.4 L engine that increased performance and fuel economy.

=== Renault 5 Alpine / Gordini / Copa ===
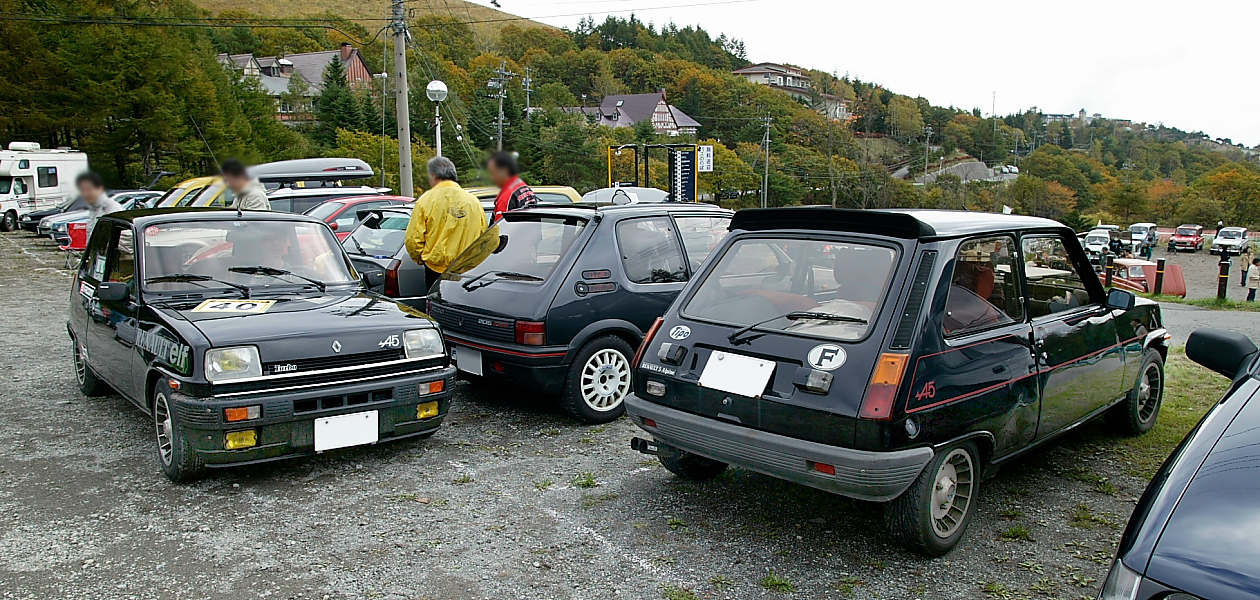
Renault 5 Alpine

The Renault 5 Alpine was one of the first 'hot hatches' launched in 1976 – two months before the original Volkswagen Golf GTi. The right-hand drive 5 Alpine was shown at the British Motor Show in 1978, with sales from 4 April 1979 in the U.K. – but as the Renault 5 Gordini, because Chrysler Europe already had the rights to the name "Alpine" in the U.K. They had just used it on the Chrysler Alpine, the U.K. badged RHD Simca 1307, introduced at that time. It was months before the 1976 VW Golf GTi right-hand drive, which took Volkswagen three years to convert to RHD.

Use of the name Gordini came from Amédée Gordini, a French car tuner with links with Renault and previous sporting models, such as the Renault 8. Those cars and the Alpine Turbo models were assembled at Alpine's Dieppe factory beginning in 1975. The U.K. launch price was £4,149 – nearly a third more than the previous top model, the 5 TS, at £3,187 – showing the considerable changes to the car, over the 64 PS (63 hp; 47 kW) 5 TS, which could not reach 161 km/h (100 mph), compared to the 93 PS (92 hp; 68 kW) Gordini, which could reach 177 km/h (110 mph).

The 1.4 L (1397 cc) OHV engine, mated to a five-speed gearbox, was based on the Renault "Sierra" pushrod engine, but having a crossflow cylinder head with hemispherical combustion chambers and developed 93 PS (68 kW; 92 hp), twice as much as a standard 1.1 L (1108 cc) Renault 5. The larger engine and its various performance parts meant that the spare wheel could no longer fit there and was relocated to the boot. The Alpine could be identified by special alloy wheels and front fog lights and was equipped with stiffened suspension, but still retaining the torsion bar at the rear with added anti-roll bars. Renault quoted a top speed of 110 mph (177 km/h) and tested in the July 1979 issue of UK magazine Car, it achieved a top speed of 110 mph (177 km/h) and 0–60 mph (0–97 km/h) in 9.7 seconds. The UK car magazine Motor road test figures quoted top speed of 104.7 mph (168.5 km/h) and 0–60 mph (0–97 km/h) in 9.7 seconds.

=== Renault 5 Alpine Turbo/Gordini Turbo/Copa Turbo ===
The Renault 5 Alpine Turbo was launched in 1982 as an upgraded successor to the naturally aspirated Alpine. In Britain, the car was still called Gordini rather than Alpine. Motor magazine undertook a road test of the Turbo in 1982 and while they appreciated the performance (top speed 179.9 km/h (111.8 mph), 0 to 97 kilometres per hour (0 to 60 mph) in 8.7 seconds), they were critical of its high price as it was £2 more than the larger Ford Escort XR3.

The 1.4 L (1,397 cc) engine in the Alpine/Gordini Turbo had a single Garrett T3 turbocharger, increasing the power output to 110 bhp (82 kW; 112 PS). Sales continued until 1984 when the second generation Renault 5 was launched, and the release of the Renault 5 GT Turbo in 1985.

=== Renault 5 Turbo ===
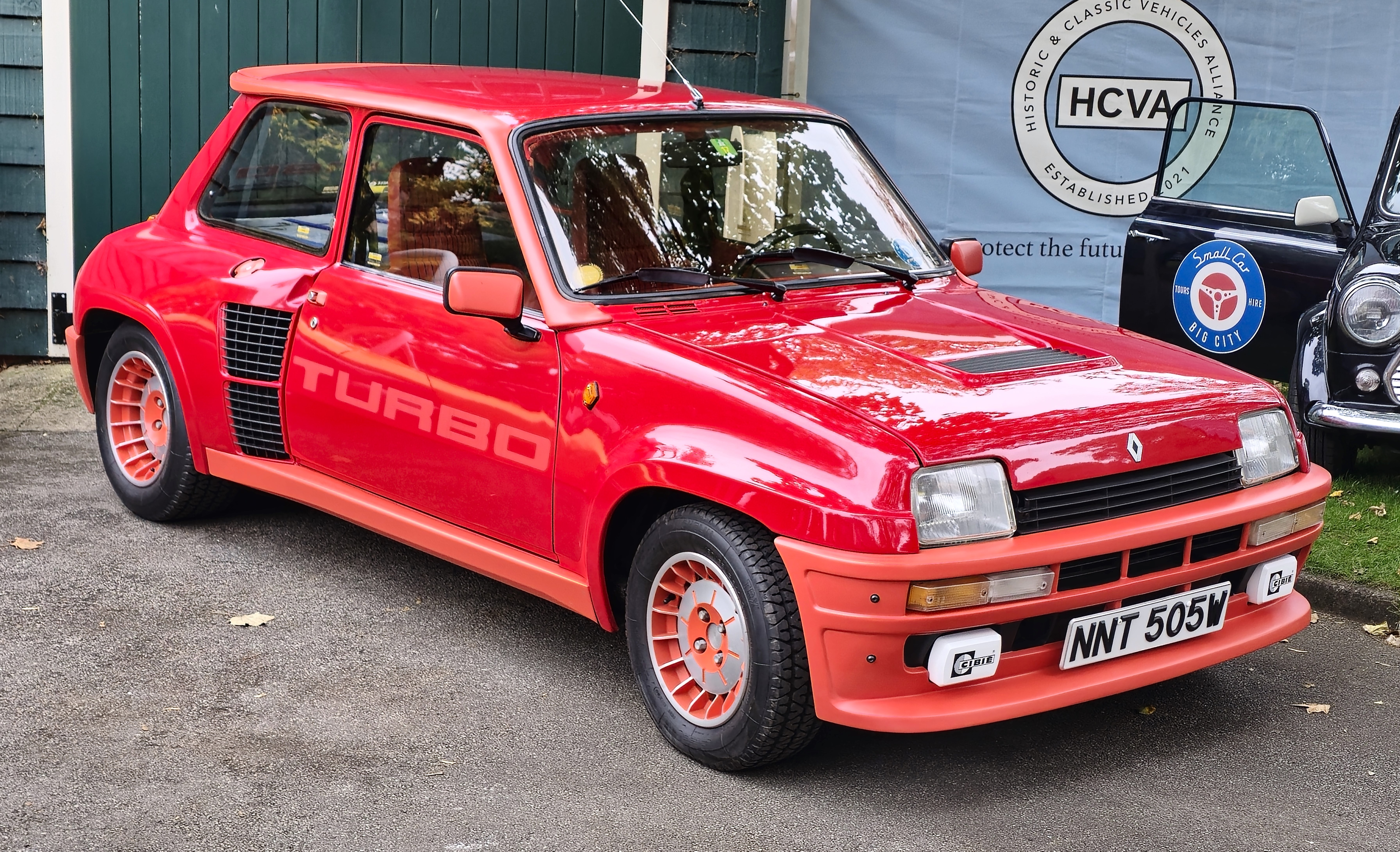
Renault 5 Turbo (mid-engined)

The Renault 5 Turbo should not be confused with the Alpine Turbo or GT Turbo as it was radically modified by mounting a turbocharged engine behind the driver in what is usually the passenger compartment, creating a mid-engined rally car. It was also driven by the rear wheels rather than the front wheels. The Renault 5 Turbo was made in many guises, eventually culminating with the Renault 5 Maxi Turbo. With 8-valves, the 1.4-litre turbocharged inline-four Cléon-Fonte engine produced 160 PS (158 hp; 118 kW) at 6000 rpm and maximum torque of 221 newton-metres (163 lb⋅ft) at 3250 rpm.

=== Renault Le Car ===
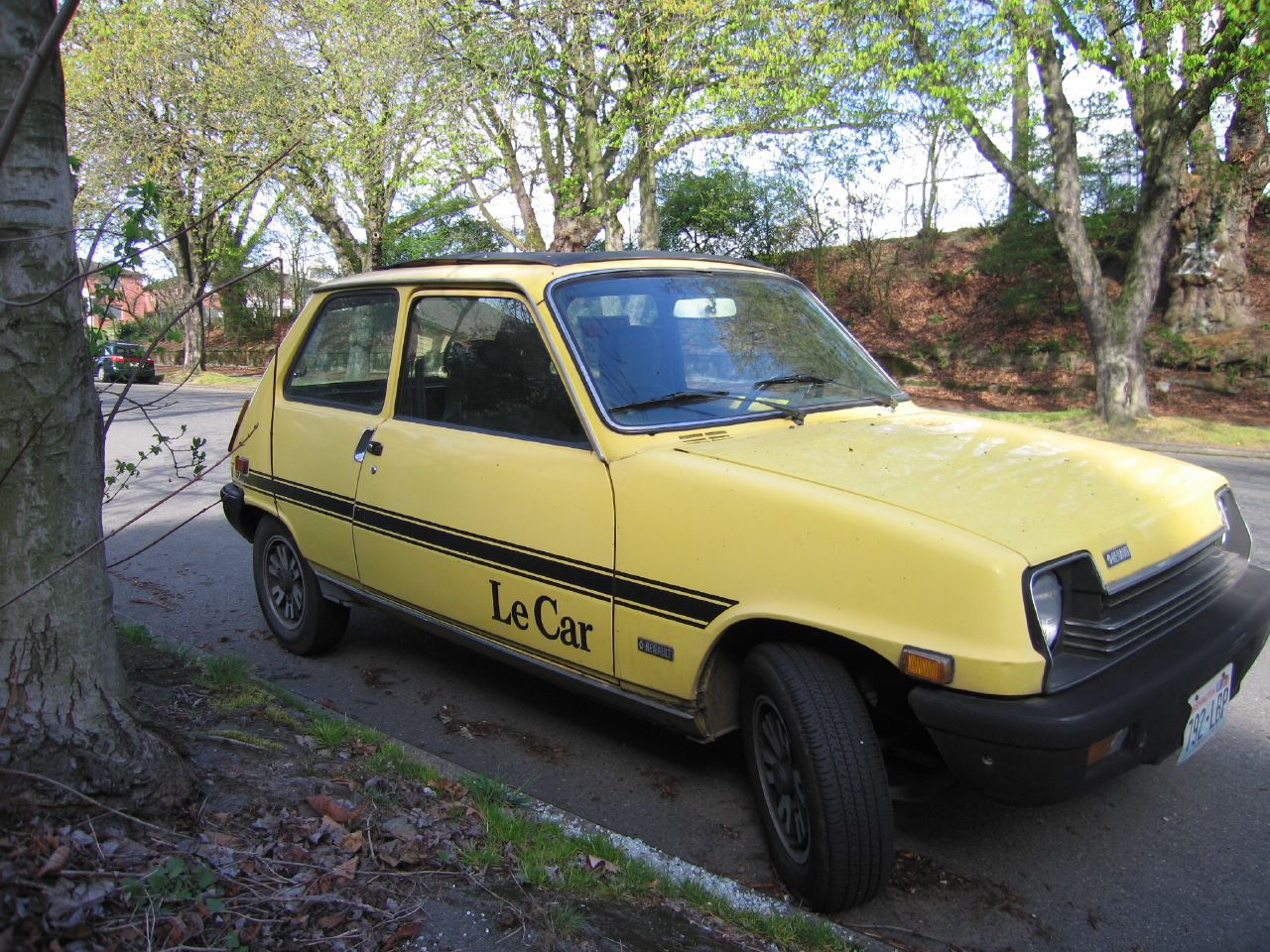
"Le Car" version marketed by AMC

Renault had about 250 dealerships in the United States. The North American Renault 5 debuted in 1976, but sales were disappointing, and many cars remained on dealer lots. Renault's response was to change advertising agencies and rebrand the vehicle for the following year as "Le Car." The new marketing campaign stressed the car's sporty character and successful European competition history.

Renault formed an alliance in January 1979, allowing Renault cars to be sold and serviced by American Motors Corporation (AMC) dealers. The automaker marketed it through its 1,300 dealers, where it competed in the United States against such front-wheel-drive subcompacts as the Honda Civic and Volkswagen Rabbit. It was described as a "French Rabbit" that "is low on style, but high on personality and practicality".

American Motors' ad agency launched the car in the U.S. with a marketing campaign emphasizing that it was Europe's best-selling automobile with millions of satisfied owners. It did not achieve such immediate success in the United States market, even though the Le Car was praised in road tests comparing "super-economy" cars for its interior room and smooth ride, with an economical [35 mpg_{‑US} (6.7 L/100 km; 42 mpg_{‑imp}) highway and 28 mpg_{‑US} (8.4 L/100 km; 34 mpg_{‑imp}) city] as well as its smooth-running engine. Advertisements also focused on the Le Car's standard features and low base price, actually comparing it to the imported Ford Fiesta, Honda Civic, and VW Rabbit.

The U.S. version featured a desmogged 1289 cc inline-four engine rated at 60 hp (45 kW). In 1977, it dominated the Sports Car Club of America "Showroom Stock Class C" class. Ever tightening emissions legislation meant that power was down to 51 hp (38 kW) by 1980.

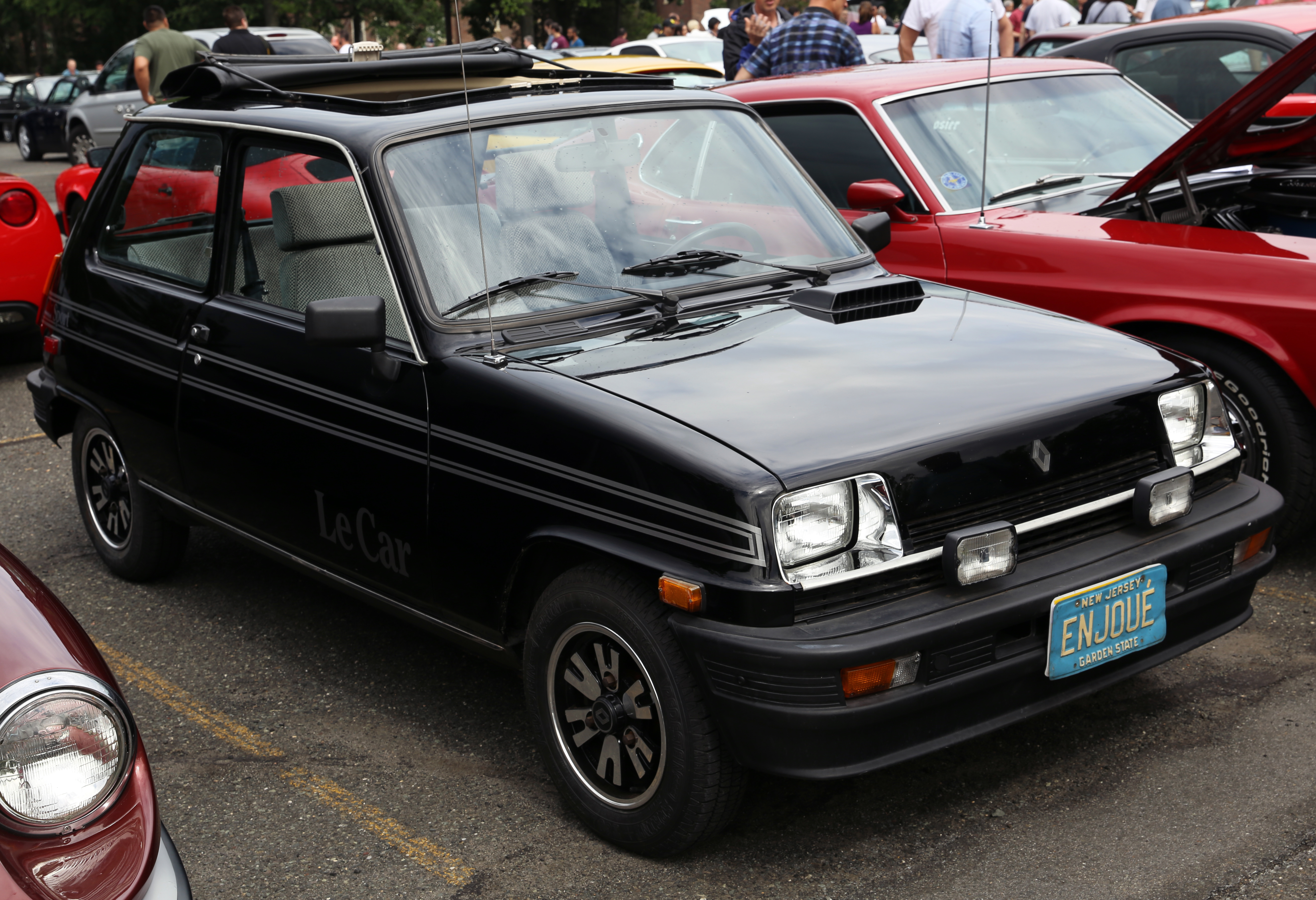
1983 Renault Le Car Sport

The Le Car was offered in three-door hatchback form only from 1976 until 1980. For the 1980 model year, the front end was updated to include a redesigned bumper, grille, and rectangular headlights. A five-door hatchback body style was added in the 1981 model year. Sales increased each year, from 6,800 in 1976 to 37,000 in 1982. Although the Le Car did not see popularity in the U.S., it sold reasonably well in Canada. Imports from France continued through 1983, when the car was replaced by the Kenosha, Wisconsin—built Renault 11-based Renault Alliance. Sales in Canada continued until 1986, two years after the second generation Renault 5 (known as the Supercinq or Superfive) had replaced it in the European market. Despite the 'Le Car' brand being created specifically for the North American market, Renault later applied the name to special edition versions of the Renault 5 in Europe from 1979 onward.

The Le Car was used as a law enforcement vehicle. The La Conner, Washington, police department acquired three of the vehicles for its fleet in the late-1970s. Because they were early adopters, Renault advertised Le Car's versatility in a full-page ad illustrating its use by the department. The chief of police, Russ Anderson, was quoted "Gas is killing us. With Le Car, we were able to decrease our budget and increase our mobility." Another small town, Ogunquit, Maine, used five Renault 5s as their police cars in the late 1970s and early 1980s.

Heuliez built and sold van conversions as Le Car Van. The rear side panels were replaced with plastic panels incorporating a round porthole window and a new liftgate featuring a smaller window. The interior was red velour. It was available both in two- and four-seat versions. Between 1979 and 1983, about 450 Le Car Vans were built.

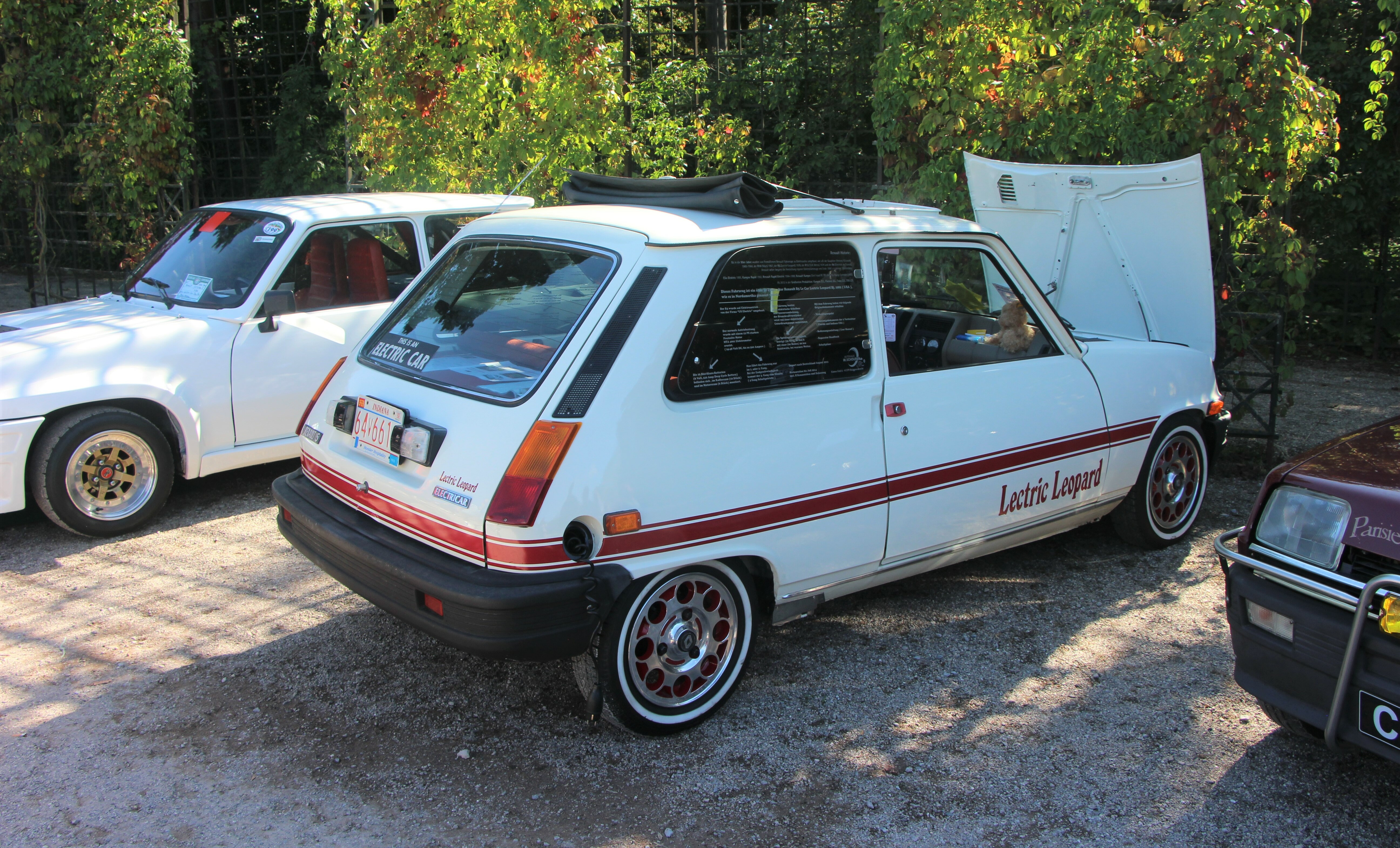
Lectric Leopard (1979)

U.S. Electricar, based in Athol, Massachusetts, performed electric vehicle conversions on the Renault Le Car, installing sixteen six-volt lead-acid batteries, providing a modest range of 60 km (37 mi). In 1978, the converted cars were rebranded "Lectric Leopard" and marketed to government agencies.

=== Chronology ===
- January 1972: Introduction of the Renault 5 in L and TL forms. Both models (which were available as three-door hatchbacks) had folding rear seats, grey bumpers, wind-up front windows, and dashboard-mounted gear shift levers. The TL was better equipped and had a vanity mirror for the front seat passenger, three ashtrays (one under the gear shift and two in the rear), two separate reclining front seats instead of one bench seat, front pull handles, and three storage pockets as well as a heated rear window.
- September 1972: The Renault 5 was launched on the British market in right-hand drive form.
- 1973: Gear lever moved from dashboard to floor, between the front seats.
- April 1974: Introduction of the R5 LS, same as the R5 TL but with a larger 1.3 engine, different design steel wheels, H4 iodine headlights, electric windscreen washers, fully carpeted floor ahead of the front seats, carpeted rear parcel shelf, electronic rev counter, daily totalizer, two-speed ventilation system, rear wiper, and an illuminated ashtray with cigarette lighter.
- September 1974: R5 LS renamed R5 TS. The TS had all features of the previous LS, plus new front seats with integrated head restraints, black bumpers, illuminated heater panel, front spoiler, clock, opening rear quarter lights and reversing lights.
- February 1976: Introduction of the R5 Alpine, with 1397 cc engine with hemispherical combustion chambers, high compression ratio, and special five-speed manual gearbox. The R5 GTL was also launched in 1976 with the 1289 cc engine from the R5 TS (rated at 42 bhp (31 kW; 43 PS), the equipment specification of the R5 TL plus grey side protection strips, and some features from the R5 TS such as the styled wheels, reversing lights, cigarette lighter, illuminated heater panel, and electric windscreen washers.
- 1977: The R5 GTL featured opening rear quarter side windows and the R5 L included the new 845 cc engine.
- January 1978: Introduction of the R5 automatic, essentially a GTL with a three-speed automatic transmission and some features from the TS.
- August 1979: Five-door model presented and improvements to the whole range, like new dashboard, new heating/ventilation controls, new seats and inner door locks
- 1980: Five-door TL, GTL, and automatic models arrive
- 1982: Introduction of the R5 TX and the hot hatch R5 Alpine Turbo, a replacement for the R5 Alpine with a Garrett T3 turbo, new alloy wheels, stiffer suspension, and disc brakes on all four wheels.
- 1984: The R5 is replaced by an all-new second-generation model.

=== Engines ===
- B1B 0.8 L (845 cc; 51.6 cu in) 8-valve I4; 37 PS (27 kW; 36 hp); top speed: 126 km/h (78 mph); 0–100 km/h (0–62 mph): 22.3 s
- C1C (689) 1.0 L (956 cc; 58.3 cu in) 8-valve I4; 42 PS (31 kW; 41 hp); top speed: 130 km/h (81 mph) also with 44 PS (32 kW; 43 hp); top speed: 135 km/h (84 mph)

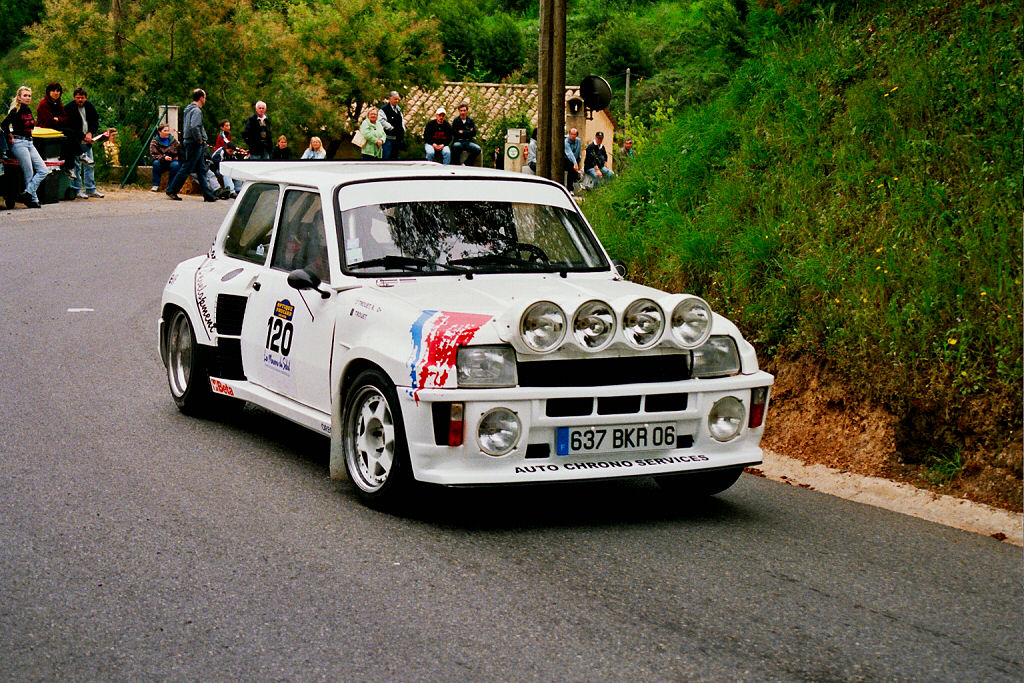
Renault 5 Turbo rally car

- C1E (688) 1.1 L (1,108 cc; 67.6 cu in) 8-valve I4; 45 PS (33 kW; 44 hp); top speed: 136 km/h (85 mph); 0–100 km/h (0–62 mph): 21.4 s
- 810 1.3 L (1,289 cc; 78.7 cu in) 8-valve I4; 55 PS (40 kW; 54 hp); top speed: 140 km/h (87 mph) (automatic)
- 810 1.3 L (1,289 cc; 78.7 cu in) 8-valve I4; 64 PS (47 kW; 63 hp); top speed: 154 km/h (96 mph); 0–100 km/h (0–62 mph): 15.6 s
- C1J (847) 1.4 L (1,397 cc; 85.3 cu in) 8-valve I4; 63 PS (46 kW; 62 hp); top speed: 142 km/h (88 mph); 0–100 km/h (0–62 mph): 21.4 s (automatic)
- C6J 1.4 L (1,397 cc; 85.3 cu in) turbo 8-valve I4; 110 PS (81 kW; 108 hp); top speed: 185 km/h (115 mph); 0–100 km/h (0–62 mph): 9.1 s
- C1J 1.4 L (1,397 cc; 85.3 cu in) turbo 8-valve I4; 160 PS (118 kW; 158 hp); top speed: 204 km/h (127 mph); 0–100 km/h (0–62 mph): 6.9 s

=== Motorsport ===
The Renault 5 Alpine version was raced in Group 2. In the 1978 Monte Carlo, Renault 5 Alpines came second and third overall, despite a powerful team entry from Fiat and Lancia.

In 1978, a rally Group 4 (later Group B) version was introduced. It was named the Renault 5 Turbo, but being mid-engined and rear-wheel drive, this car had little technical resemblance to the road-going version. Though retaining the shape and general look of the 5, only the door panels were shared with the standard version. Driven by Jean Ragnotti, this car won the 1981 Monte Carlo Rally for its first race. The 2WD R5 turbo soon faced competition from new 4WD vehicles that were faster on dirt; however, the Renault remained among the fastest of its era on paved roads.

=== Production elsewhere ===
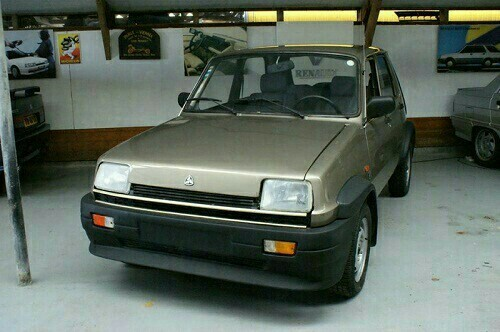
Pars Khodro Renault 5 (Renault PK)

Iran

The original Renault 5 continued to be produced in Iran by SAIPA, then by Pars Khodro (a SAIPA subsidiary), as the Sepand. In 2001, the Renault PK went on sale: for this version, the Sepand's Renault 5 platform was replaced with that of a Kia Pride, while a modified version of the Renault 5's bodywork was kept. The Sepand II, restyled in 2000, was kept in production with the original Renault underpinnings for a little while longer as a lower-cost alternative.

South Africa

Assembly in South Africa began in late 1975, in Durban. The car was built in Toyota's local plant and sold through their network. The Renault 5 was only available with one engine, the 1.3 L unit used in the European R5 TS rated at 49.29 kW (67.0 PS; 66.1 hp) SAE. There was a base model, with vinyl seats and lap belts only, and the upmarket LS and LSS models. These received fabric interiors, side stripes, a vinyl roof, more sound deadening, and other comfort details. The LSS also included a central console and a full-length fabric sunroof. Many extras used in Europe, such as a rear window wiper and a tachometer, were unavailable in South Africa because it would make it impossible to meet local content regulations. Local content was 56% at introduction; this was to be increased steadily as production wore on.

By 1979, the lineup was restricted to the GTL and the TS, both still with the 1289 cc engine but now with 34 or 46 kW (46 or 63 PS; 46 or 62 hp) ISO respectively.

Yugoslavia

IMV from Novo Mesto, SR Slovenia, built several Renault models since 1972, including the Renault 5 for the Yugoslav market.

== Second generation (1984–1996) ==
Renault 5 (second generation)
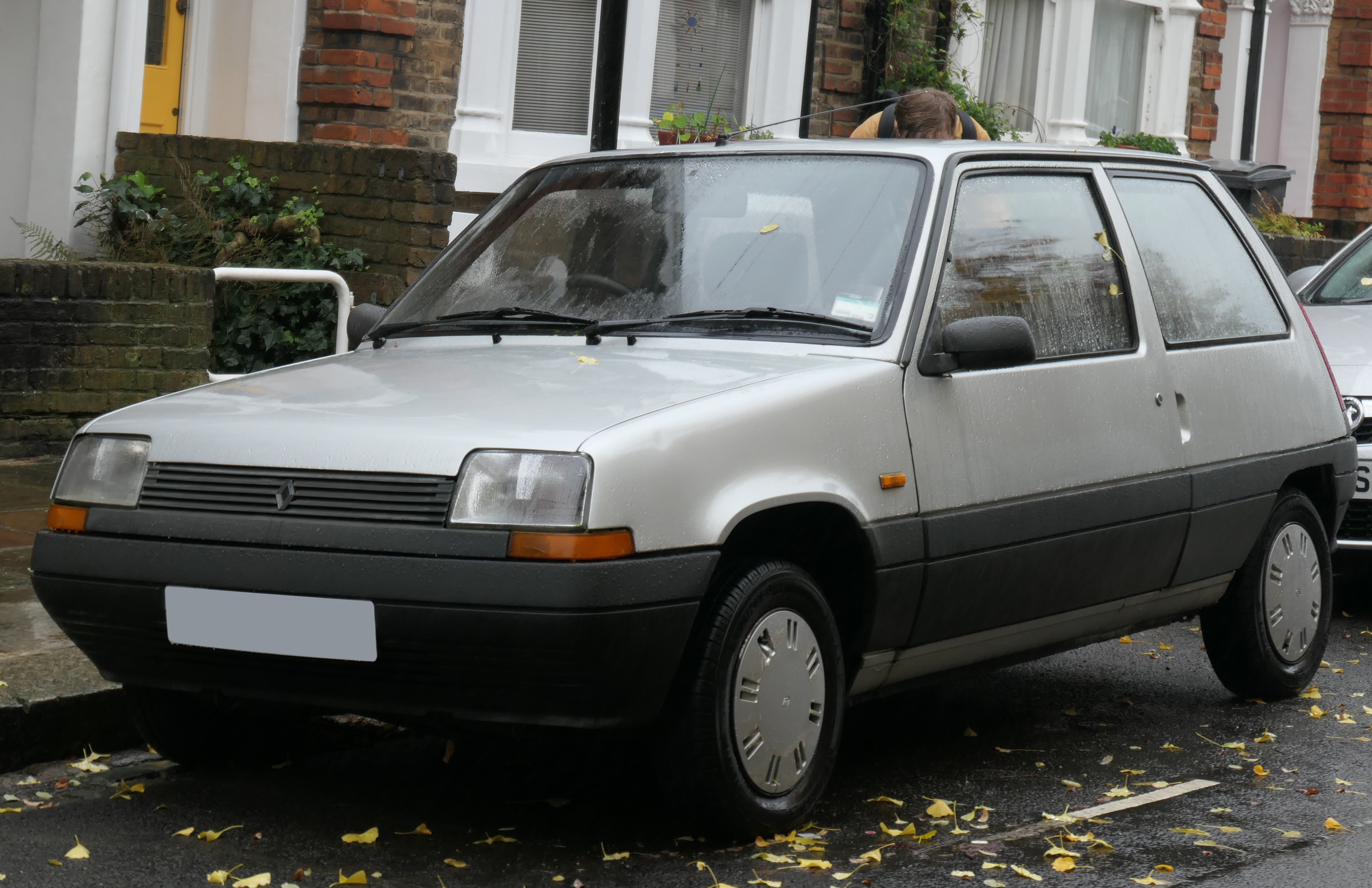
- Second generation R5, 3-doors (pre-facelift)

Overview
- Also called: Renault Supercinq; Renault Supercinque; Renault Supercinco
- Production: 1984–1996
- Assembly: France: Boulogne-Billancourt; France: Dieppe (Alpine); Spain: Palencia (FASA-Renault); Slovenia: Novo Mesto (Renault Slovenia)
- Designer: Marcello Gandini

Body and chassis
- Body style: 3/5-door hatchback
- Layout: FF layout
- Related: Renault Express

Powertrain
- Engine: 956 cc C1C I4; 1108 cc C1E I4; 1237 cc C1G I4; 1390 cc C3J MPFI I4; 1397 cc C1J/C2J I4; 1397 cc C1J Turbo I4; 1721 cc F2N I4; 1721 cc F3N I4; 1596 cc F8M diesel I4
- Transmission: 3-speed automatic 4-speed manual 5-speed manual

Dimensions
- Wheelbase: 2,407 mm (94.8 in) (3-door); 2,467 mm (97.1 in) (5-door)
- Length: 3,591 mm (141.4 in) (3-door); 3,651 mm (143.7 in) (5-door)
- Width: 1,584 mm (62.4 in)
- Height: 1,387 mm (54.6 in) (3-door); 1,397 mm (55.0 in) (5-door)
- Kerb weight: 695–840 kg (1,532–1,852 lb)

The second generation R5, marketed as the Renault 5 (or Supercinq, Superfive), launched in October 1984 — within 18 months of Ford, General Motors, Peugeot, Fiat and Nissan launching competitors in the supermini sector. Initially, It was only available with a three-door body, leading to a somewhat slow introduction. Right-hand drive models for the UK market were launched in January 1985.

Although it closely resembled the first generation car, the bodyshell and platform were completely new (the platform was based on that of the bigger Renault 9 and 11 models); the styling was by Marcello Gandini. The new body was wider and longer with 20 percent more glass area, more interior space, and a lower drag coefficient of (0.35), as well as 4.10 L/100 km; 68.9 mpg_{‑imp} (57.4 mpg_{‑US}) at 90 km/h (56 mph) in the economy models. The most significant changes were the adoption of a transversely-mounted powertrain from the 9 and 11 and MacPherson strut front suspension. The five-door version arrived in May 1985, with a 60 mm (2.4 in) extended wheelbase.

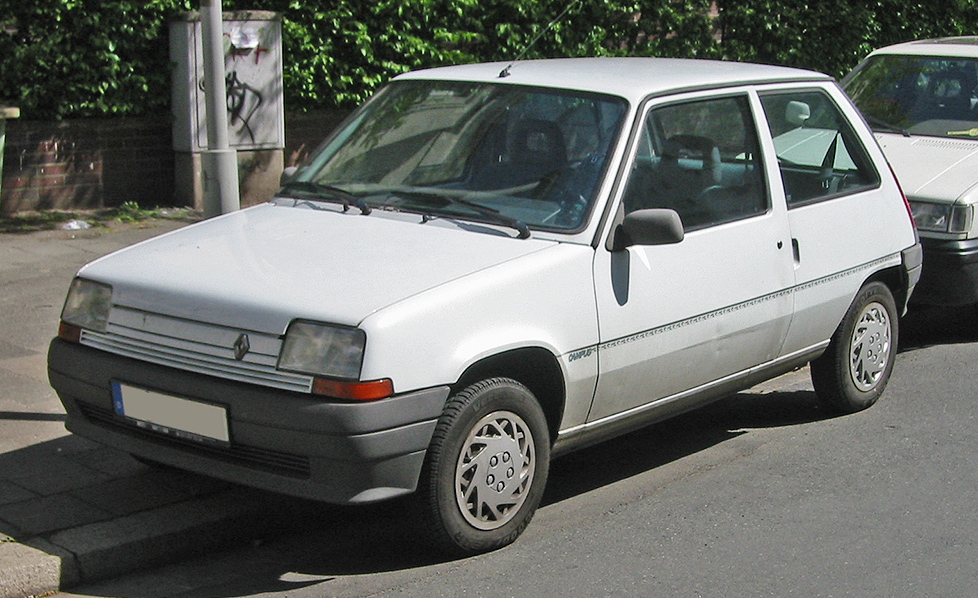
Second generation R5, 3-doors (post-facelift)

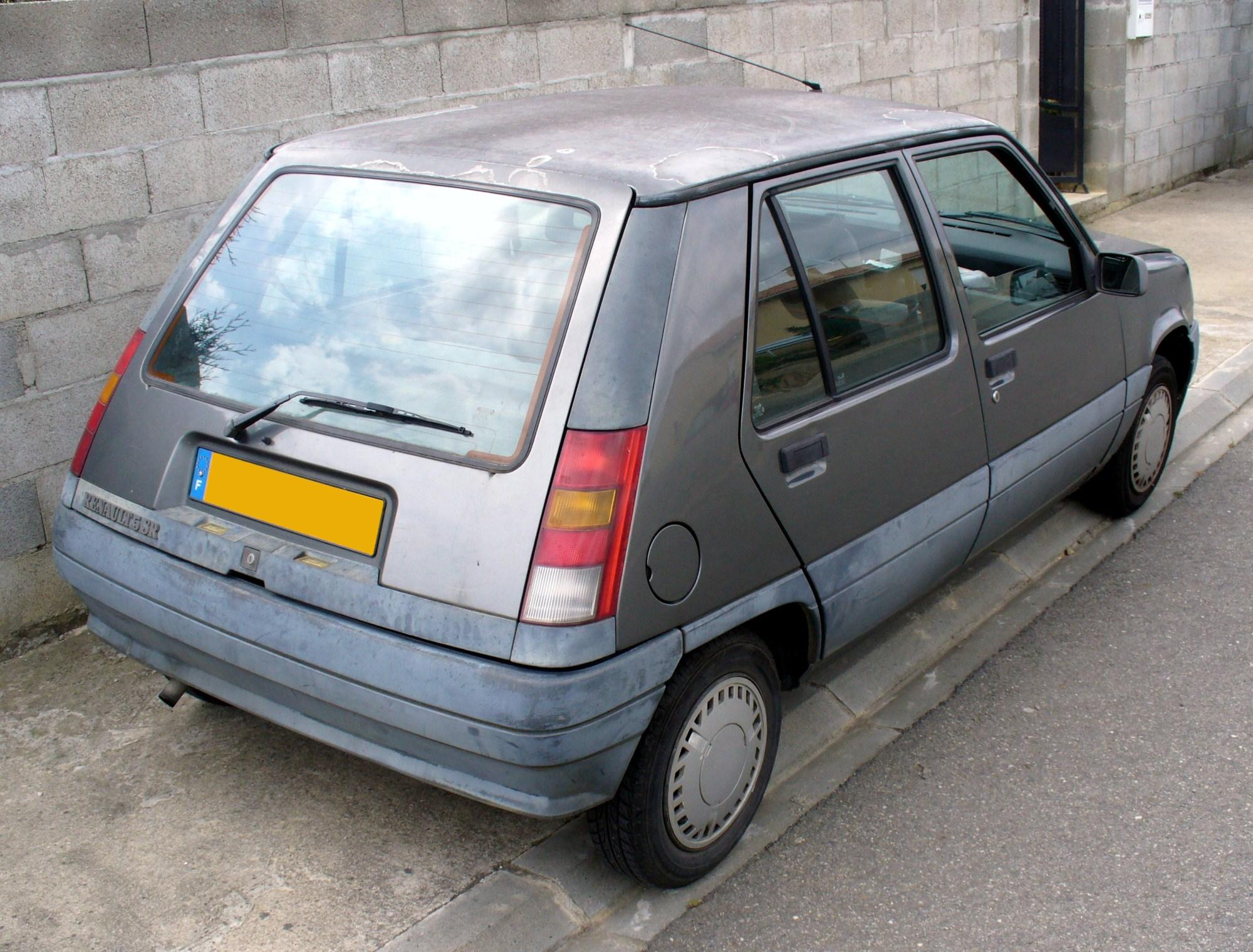
Second generation, 5-doors (pre-facelift)

The second generation launched in four trim levels: TC, TL, GTL, and Automatic. The entry-level TC had the 956 cc engine of ((31 kW (42 bhp), while the TL had the 1108 cc engine of (35 kW (47 bhp), and the GTL, Automatic, TS and TSE had the 1397 cc engine (rated at 44 kW; 59 hp (60 PS) for the GTL, 50 kW; 67 hp (68 PS) for the Automatic, and 53 kW; 71 hp (72 PS) for the TS and TSE). The TC and TL had four-speed manual gearboxes, while the GTL, TS, and TSE had five-speed manual gearboxes (optional on the TL), and the Automatic had a three-speed automatic gearbox. 1987 saw the introduction of the 1721 cc F2N engine in the GTX, GTE (F3N), and in July also in the luxurious Baccara . The Baccara was sold as the Monaco in the United Kingdom, as the "Exclusiv" in Germany, and as the "Limited" in Italy. Italian buyers also had the option of the 1.4 engine in the top version, whereas only the 1.7 was available elsewhere. Diesel versions arrived in November 1985, mostly completing the range.

It was planned to market the vehicle as a downsized successor, substituting the AMC Pacer in the United States, which affected the design of the R5. Within the alliance of Renault and the American Motors Corporation, only its predecessor was marketed in the U.S.

Renault used the naturally aspirated 1.7 L from the Renault 9/11, with multipoint fuel injection, in addition to the sports-orientated 1.4 L turbo. Under the name GTE, it produced 70 kW; 94 hp (95 PS) with a catalytic converter. Although not as fast as the turbo model, it featured the same interior and exterior sports appearance, as well as identical suspension and brakes. The Baccara and GTX versions used the 1.7 engine — with the GTX featuring a full leather interior, power steering, electric windows, sunroof, high-specification audio equipment, with available air-conditioning and an onboard computer. The latter was effectively the same, but the leather interior was an option and there were other detail changes. As with the previous generation, the 5 Turbo was again assembled at the Alpine plant in Dieppe, where forty cars per day were constructed in 1985.

In 1990, the R5 was effectively replaced by the Clio, which was a sales success across Europe. Production of the R5 was transferred to the Revoz factory in Yugoslavia (since 1991 called Slovenia) when the Clio was launched. It remained on sale with only the 1.1 L, 1.4 L petrol, and 1.6 L naturally aspirated diesel engines.

The GT Turbo, with its turbocharged 1.4 engine and a top speed of more than 190 km/h (120 mph), was discontinued in 1991 on the launch of the Clio 16-valve.

A new 1.4 L engine with a catalytic converter engine used in the Clio was introduced during December 1992, which also marked the end of the R5 Diesel (retail market commercial fleet models kept this option). The most common variant available after the Clio had been introduced as a minimally equipped model named the R5 Campus until the car's 12-year production ended in 1996. It also marked the end of the R5 designation after nearly 25 years and the discontinuation of numerical model designations for Renault cars that had been used for much of the company's history.

The Campus sold more strongly in the United Kingdom than elsewhere, because the Renault Twingo (which addressed the same market) was only sold in LHD and exclusively in mainland Europe. In 2011, it was recommended as one of "Britain's best bangers", by Car Mechanics Magazine because of the number of inexpensive, low mileage, full-service history, and used cars on the market. The Campus name was revived in 2005 with the Renault Clio II.

=== Renault 5 GT Turbo ===
A "hot hatch" version, the GT Turbo, was introduced in February 1985. It used a modified four-cylinder, eight-valve Cléon 1397 cc engine, a pushrod unit dating back to the 1962 original (in 1108 cc form). It was turbocharged with an air-cooled Garrett T2 turbocharger. Weighing a mere 850 kg (1,874 lb), and producing 85 kW; 113 hp (115 PS), the GT Turbo had an excellent power-to-weight ratio, permitting it to accelerate from a standstill to 60 mph (97 km/h) in 7.5 seconds.

It came with plastic side skirts to differentiate it from the standard 5. Turbo lag was an issue, along with poor hot starting, and was considered rather difficult to control. The same engine was used in the Renault 9 and 11 Turbos. The regular 43-litre (9.5 imp gal) fuel tank was considered too small for the Turbo, and a 7-litre (1.5 imp gal) supplementary tank was installed at the rear left of the car, and the 5 GT Turbo also received an oil cooler. Suspension upgrades also meant that the ride height was lowered by 38 mm (1.5 in) in front while a new rear "four-bar" suspension, with a 31 mm (1.2 in) wider track, lowered the rear of the car by 32 mm (1.3 in). The car's steering, at 3 1/4 turns from lock to lock, was also faster than the regular cars. Disc brakes on all four wheels with ventilated rotors on the front. The aerodynamic 5.5-inch wide aluminium wheels were similar to those of the Renault Alpine V6 GT.

In 1987, the facelifted Phase II was launched. Major changes in the Phase II version included installing watercooling to the turbocharger, aiding the Phase I's oil-cooled setup, which extended the life of the turbo. It also received a new ignition system which permitted it to rev 500 rpm higher. These changes boosted engine output to over 88 kW; 118 hp (120 PS). Externally, the car was revamped, with changes (including new bumpers and arches) that reduced the car's drag coefficient from 0.36 to 0.35—giving Phase II a 0–100 km/h time of 7.5 seconds. In 1989 the GT Turbo received a new interior, and in 1990 the special edition Raider model (available only in metallic blue, with different interior and wheels) was launched. In late 1991, the Renault 5 GT Turbo was discontinued and superseded by the Clio 16V and the Clio Williams.

The Renault 5 GT Turbo's 1989 Rallye Côte d'Ivoire victory remains the only overall WRC victory for a Group N car.

WRC victories

No.	Event	Season	Driver	Co-driver	Car
1	(Ivory Coast) 21e Rallye Côte d'Ivoire	1989	(France) Alain Oreille	(France) Gilles Thimonier	Renault 5 GT Turbo

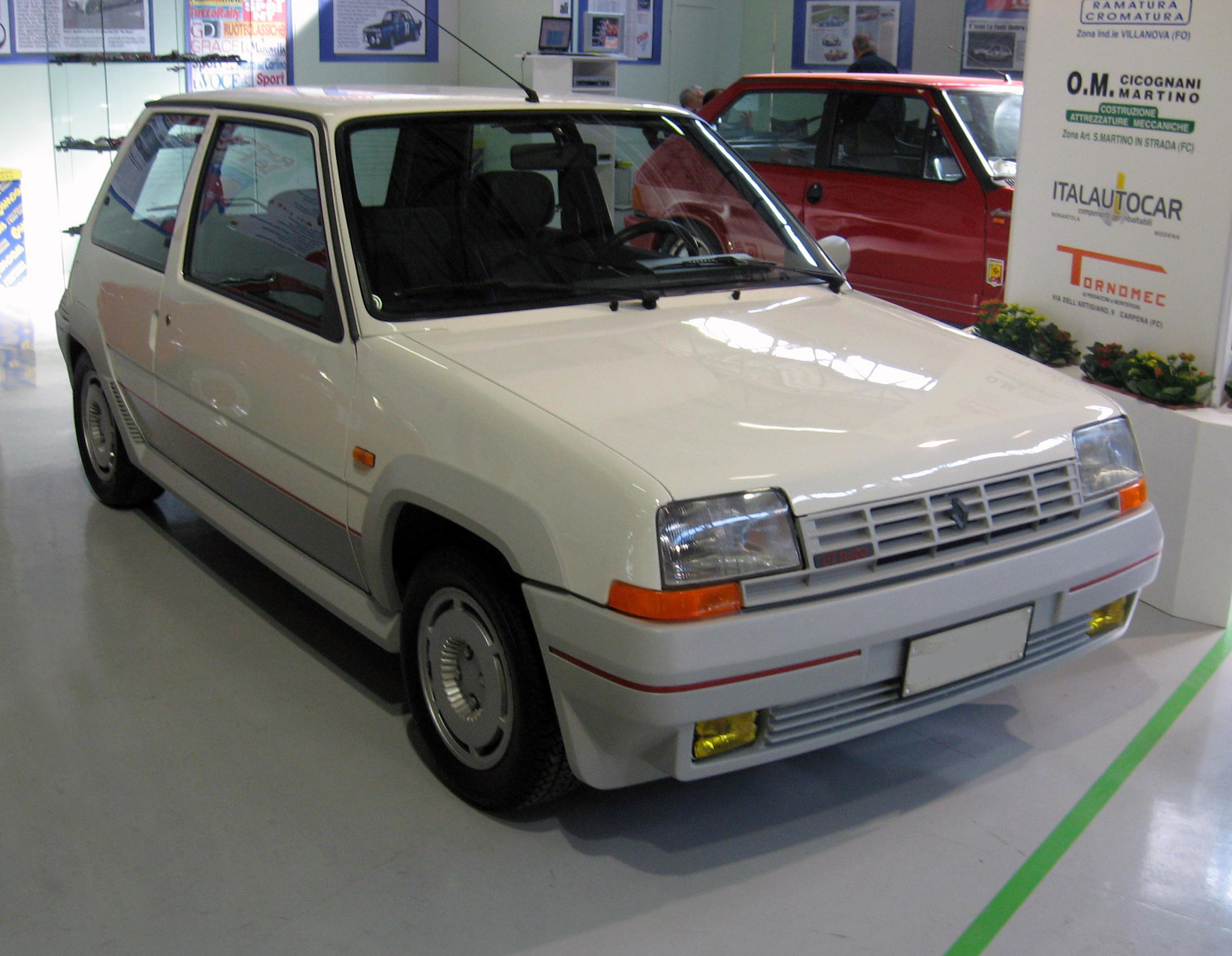
1985 Renault 5 GT Turbo (pre-facelift)

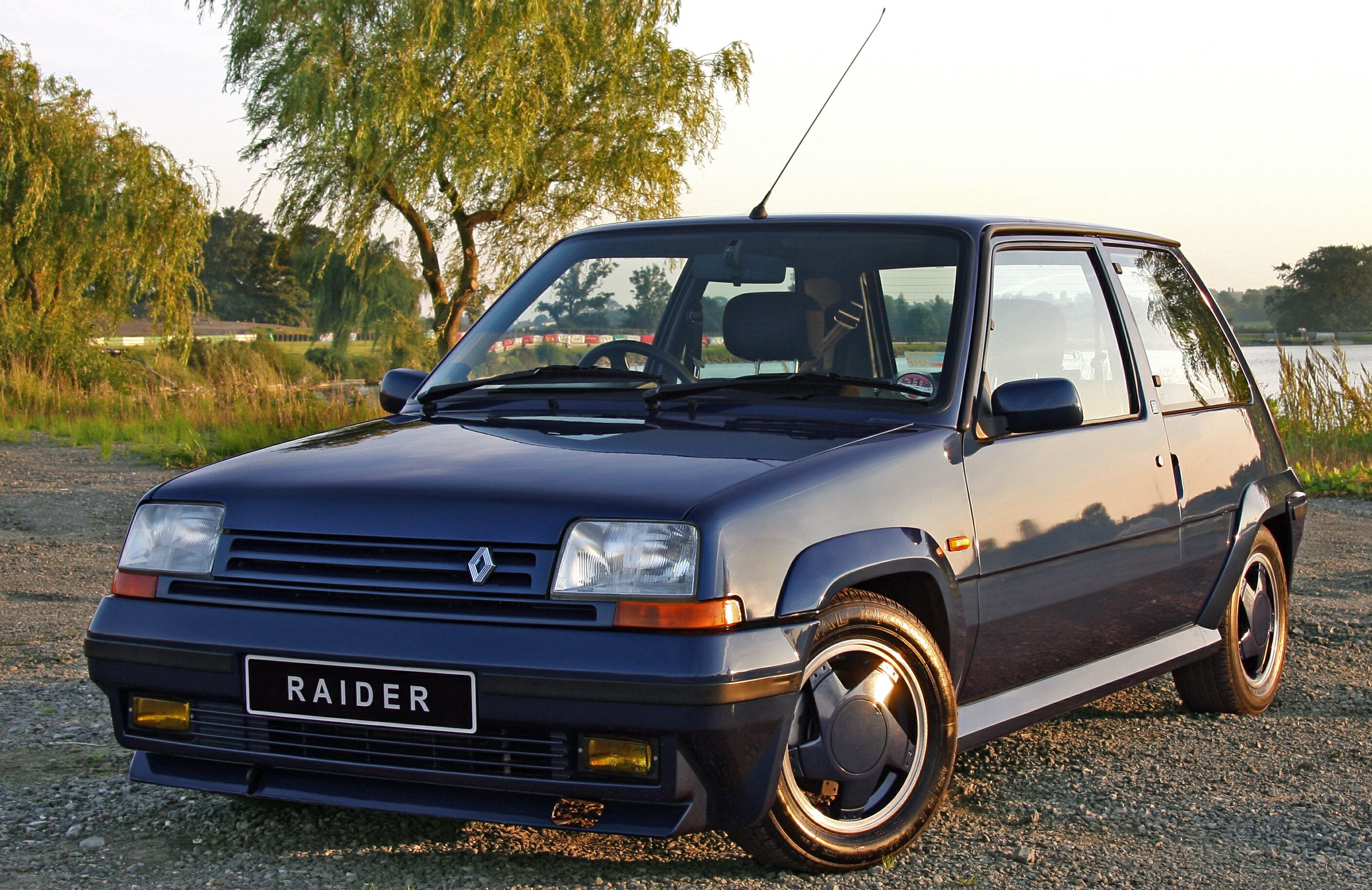
Renault 5 GT Turbo Raider

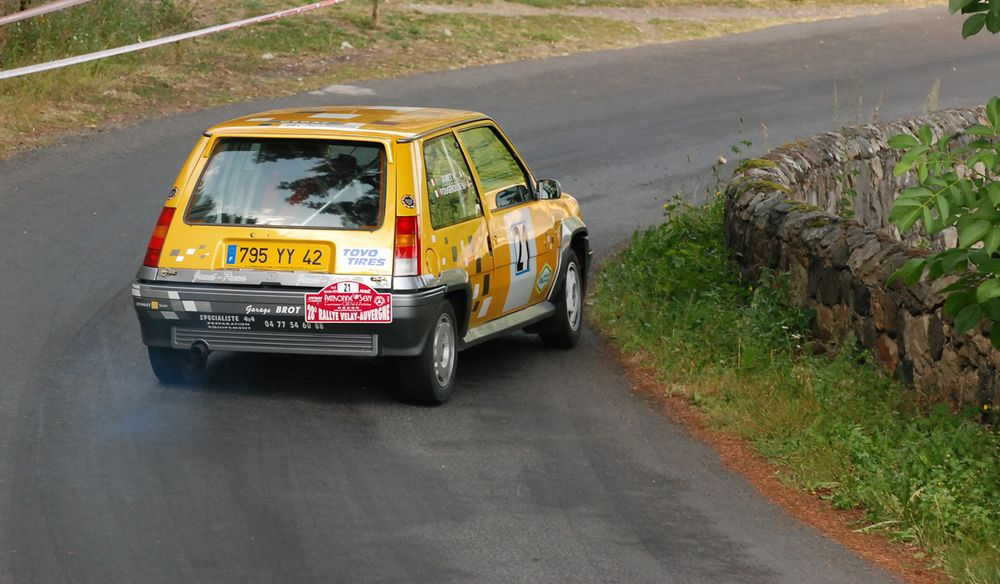
Renault 5 GT Turbo in the 2010 Rallye Velay Auvergne (Group N)

Roger Saunders and Alex Postan took part in the 1987 British Touring Car Championship season using a 5 GT Turbo.

=== Engines ===
	Body work	Trim	Model; Codes	Engine; Code	Displacement cc	Fuel System	Max. power cv/at rpm	Max. torque Nm/at rpm	Transmission	Brakes (front / rear)	Unladen mass (kg)	Max speedo max km/h	Acceler. 0–100 km/h (s)	Fuel Cons. (l/100 km)	Years of production
Petrol
1.0^{1}	3 door	C, TC	C400	C1C	956	Carburetor single barrel	42/5750	63/3000	4 sp. manual	D/DR	695	137	19"3	6.1	02/1985–07/1987
1.0^{1}	3 door	C Société	S400	C1C	956	Carburetor single barrel	42/5750	63/3000	4 sp. manual	D/DR	695	137	19"3	6.1	02/1985–05/1987
1.0^{1}	5 door	TC	B400	C1C	956	Carburetor single barrel	42/5750	63/3000	4 sp. manual	D/DR	710	137	19"3	6.1	02/1985–07/1987
1.1	3 door	L	C401	C1E	1108	Carburetor single barrel	47/5250	79/2500	4 sp. manual	D/DR	695	143	16"	5.5	09/1984–07/1986
1.1	3 door	TL	C401	C1E	1108	Carburetor single barrel	47/5250	79/2500	4 sp. manual	D/DR	695	143	16"	5.5	09/1984–05/1985
1.1	3 door	GL, GL Société	C401	C1E	1108	Carburetor single barrel	47/5250	79/2500	4 sp. manual	D/DR	695	143	16"	5.5	02/1985–07/1987
1.1	5 door	GL, GL Société	B401	C1E	1108	Carburetor single barrel	47/5250	79/2500	4 sp. manual	D/DR	710	143	16"	5.5	02/1985–07/1987
1.1	3 / 5 door	GTL	C401 / B401	C1E	1108	Carburetor single barrel	47/5250	79/2500	5 sp. manual	D/DR	750	143	16"	5.2	02/1985–07/1987
1.1	3 / 5 door	Five	C401 / B401	C1E	1108	Carburetor single barrel	47/5250	79/2500	4 sp. manual	D/DR	695	143	16"	5.5	07/1987–01/1993
1.1	3 / 5 door	SL	C401 / B401	C1E	1108	Carburetor single barrel	47/5250	79/2500	4 sp. manual	D/DR	695	143	16"	5.5	07/1987–07/1990
1.2	3 / 5 door	SR	C40F / B40F	C1G	1237	Carburetor single barrel	55/5250	88/3000	4 sp. manual - 5 sp. manual (GTR)	D/DR	745	155	-	5.9	07/1987–07/1989
1.2	3 / 5 door	TR / GTR	C40F / B40F	C1G	1237	Carburetor single barrel	55/5250	88/3000	4 sp. manual - 5 sp. manual (GTR)	D/DR	745	155	-	5.9	07/1987–07/1990
1.4	3 / 5 door	Five / Saga	C407 / B407	C3J	1390	Electronic injection	60/4750	100/3000	5 sp. manual	D/DR	750	158	-	6.8	02/1993–03/1996
1.4	3 / 5 door	GTL	C402 / B402	C1J	1397	Carburetor single barrel	60/5250	102/2500	5 sp. manual	D/DR	750	158	14"	5.9	09/1984–07/1987
1.4	3 / 5 door	Automatic	C403 / B403	C2J	1397	Carburetor; Double barrel	68/5250	104/3500	3 sp. Automatic	D/DR	800	154	16"5	6.8	02/1985–07/1991
1.4	3 / 5 door	GTS	C403 / B403	C2J	1397	Carburetor; Double barrel	72/5750^{2}	104/3500	5 sp. manual	D/DR	765	167	11"5	6.6	09/1984–07/1987
1.4	3 / 5 door	GTS	C403 / B403	C2J	1397	Carburetor; Double barrel	68/5250	104/3500	5 sp. manual	D/DR	765	165	-	6.1	07/1987–07/1990
1.4	3 door	TS	C403	C2J	1397	Carburetor; Double barrel	72/5750^{2}	104/3500	5 sp. manual	D/DR	750	167	11"5	6.6	02/1985–07/1987
1.4	3 door	TSE	C403	C2J	1397	Carburetor; Double barrel	72/5750^{2}	104/3500	5 sp. manual	D/DR	750	167	11"5	6.6	09/1984–07/1987
1.4	3 door	GT Turbo	C405	C1J	1397	Carburetor; Double barrel	115/5750	165/3000	5 sp. manual	D/D	830	201	7"6	7.4	02/1985–07/1987
1.4	3 door	GT Turbo	C405	C1J	1397	Carburetor; Double barrel	120/5750	165/3750	5 sp. manual	D/D	830	204	7"6	7.4	07/1987–07/1991
1.7	3 door	Baccara	C40G	F2N	1721	Carburetor	90/5500	135/3500	5 sp. manual	D/DR	870	180	10"	6.6	07/1987–07/1990
1.7	3 / 5 door	GTX	C40G / B40G	F2N	1721	Carburetor	90/5500	135/3500	5 sp. manual	D/DR	870	180	10"	6.6	07/1987–07/1990
1.7	3 door	GTE, Baccara, GTX	C40G	F3N	1721	Electronic injection	95/5250	143/3000	5 sp. manual	D/DR	870	185	9"3	7.9	07/1987–07/1990
Diesel
Diesel	3 / 5 door	D, TD, Five D, SD, GTD	C404 / B404	F8M	1595	Diesel Aspirated indirect injection	55/4800	100/2250	5 sp. manual	D/DR	815	150	16"5	5.1	11/1985–07/1990
Diesel	3 / 5 door	D Société, TD Société	S405	F8M	1595	Diesel Aspirated indirect injection	55/4800	100/2250	5 sp. manual	D/DR	815	150	16"5	5.1	11/1985–07/1990
Note:^{1}For the Italian market, also available in the Campus, Five, and SC^{2}For the Italian market, also available in the Limited (local name for the Baccara/Monaco)

=== Renault Express ===
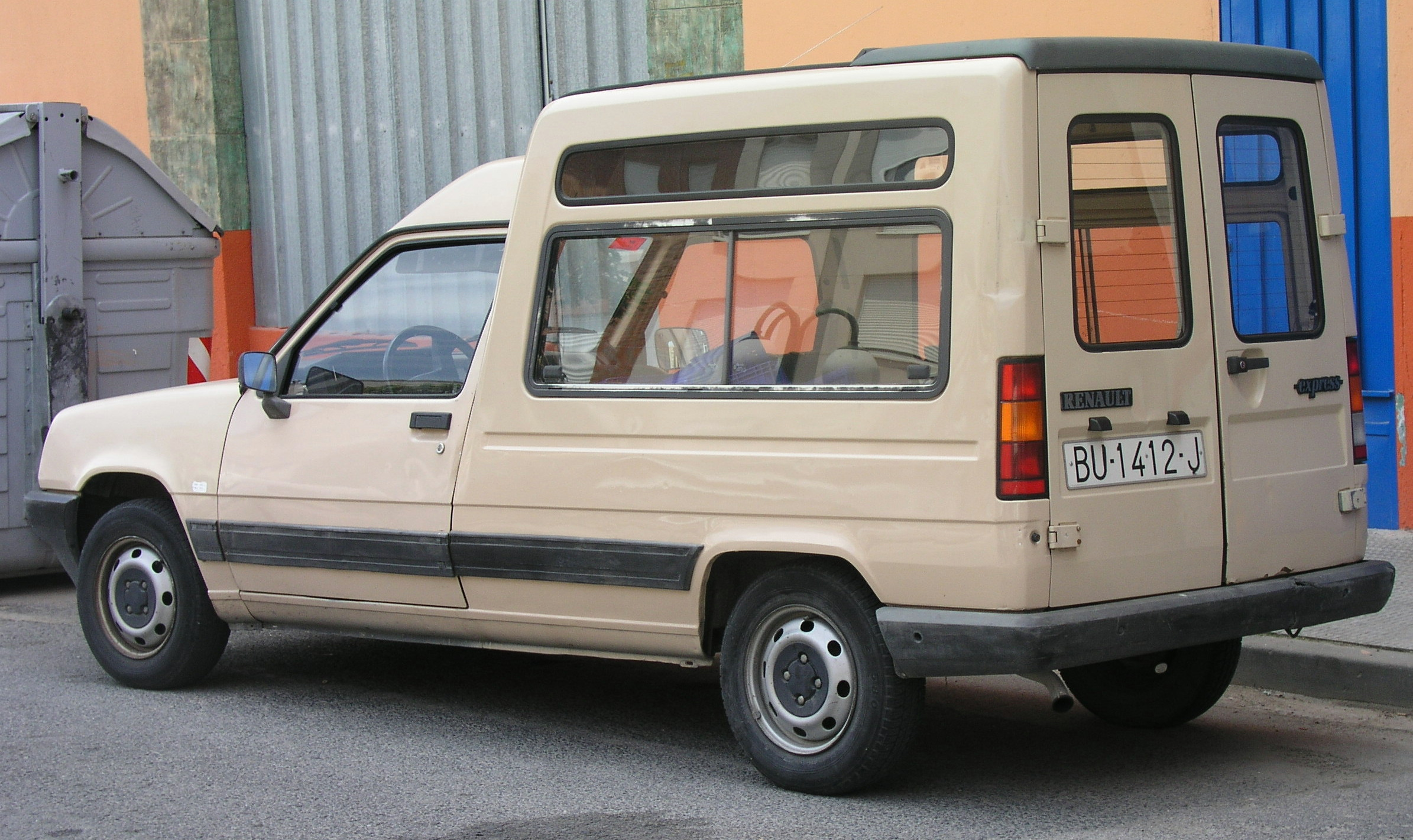
The Renault Express, a panel van version of the second generation Renault 5

The second-generation R5 also included a panel van version known as the Renault Express. It was commercialized in some European countries, such as the Renault Extra (the UK and Ireland) or Renault Rapid (mainly German speaking countries). This car was intended to replace the R4 F6 panel van, which had ceased production in 1986.

=== EBS convertible ===
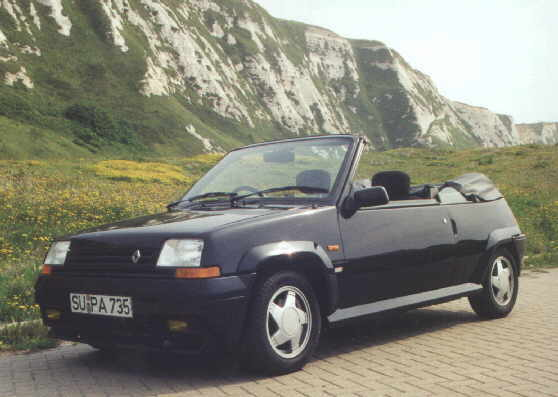
GT Turbo EBS convertible

In 1989, the Belgian company EBS produced convertible versions of the Renault 5 (1,400 in total), almost all of which were left-hand drive. A total of 14 of the 1,400 cars produced were based on the right-hand drive GT Turbo Phase II.

== Revival ==
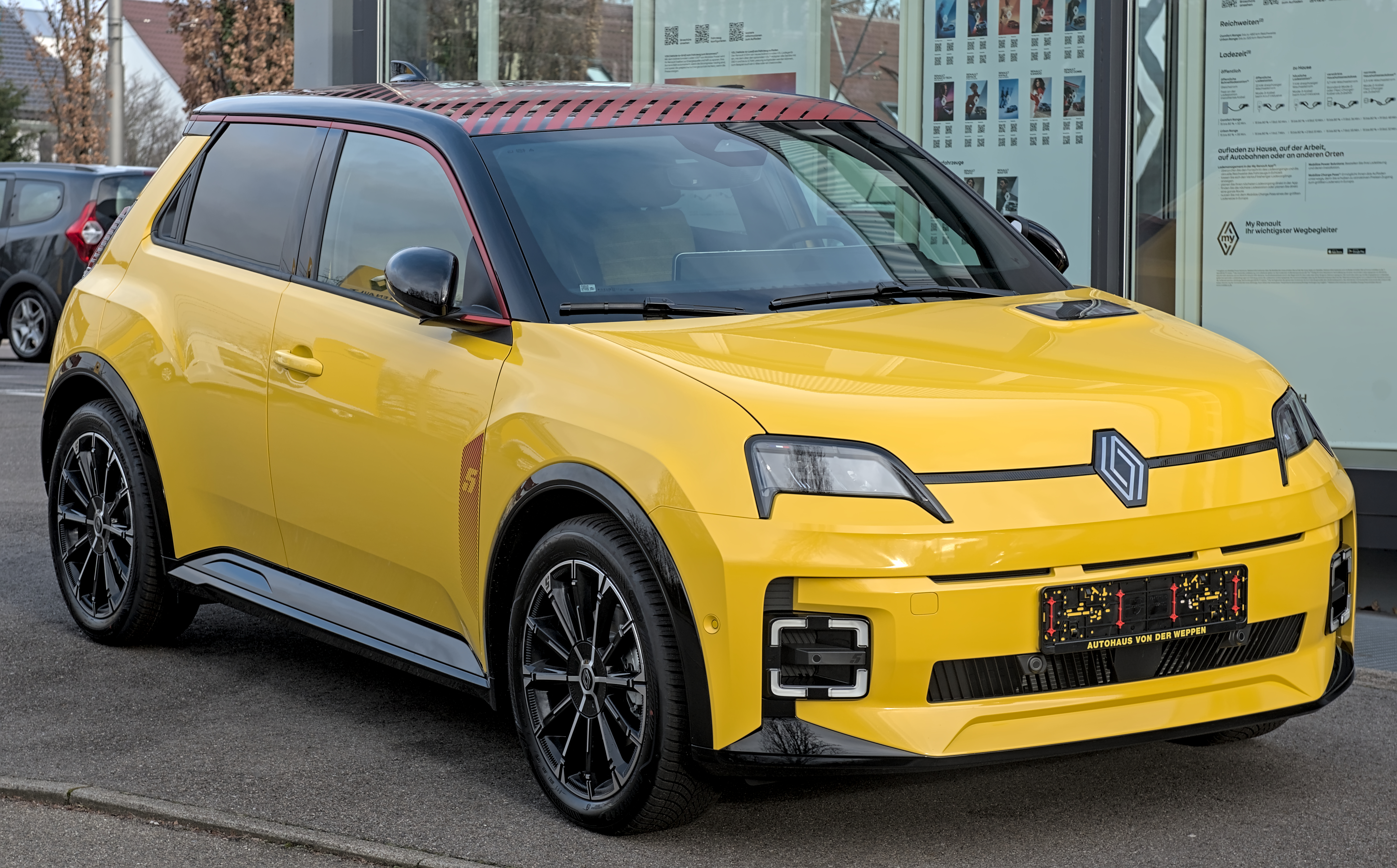
Renault 5 E-Tech

The Renault 5 nameplate returned in February 2024 as an electric-powered hatchback bearing design cues inspired by the original design and the Renault 5 Turbo. An Alpine version is said to be in development as well. The Renault 5 E-tech won the European Car of the Year award in 2025.

== Production ==
Overall production of the Renault 5 and all its variants: 9,017,276 units, comprising:

Model	Years	Units
Renault 5 French	1972–1985	5,276,630
Iranian R5	1987–1992	49,270
R5 Turbo	1980–1986	4,987
R5 Maxi	1985–1986	154
R5 society	1975–1984	218,795
Siete (Spanish R5 4-door)	1974–1982	30,790 (some sites show production between 159,000 and 160,000)
Supercinq	1984–1996	3,436,650

Renault 5 Production (not including Supercinq)
Year	All R5 except Societé & Turbo	Societé (van)	5 Turbo	5 Maxi	R7
1971–2	126376				
1973	249135				
1974	345499				5600
1975	339609	929		28	200
1976	408856	14018		27	207
1977	442905	19216		30	322
1978	444118	16429		27	269
1979	469815	19040		22	939
1980	666026	30369	804		14334
1981	587145	31755	571		6513
1982	496332	32644	445		2406
1983	423047	33612	1345		
1984	241851	20783	1497		
1985	25395		182		
1986	10521		143	20	
1987	2947				
1988	6000				
1989	3500				
1990	7645				
1991	19831				
1992	9347				
