= ACL =

ACL may refer to:

== Companies and organizations ==
- ACL Cables, a cable manufacturing company in Sri Lanka
- Administration for Community Living, US, funds groups that support elderly and disabled
- American Classical League, promotes study of Ancient Rome, Ancient Greece, Latin and Greek
- Association for Computational Linguistics, international professional association
- Association of Costs Lawyers, England and Wales
- Ateliers et Chantiers de la Loire, a French shipbuilding company
- Ateliers de Construction du Livradois, later Teilhol, a French car manufacturer
- Atlantic Coast Line Railroad, US
- Atlantic Container Line, a shipping company
- Australian Christian Lobby, a right wing Christian campaigning group

== Computing ==
- Access-control list in computer security
- ACL2, theorem prover
- Agent Communications Language or FIPA-ACL
- Allegro Common Lisp, commercial Common Lisp implementation developed by Franz Inc.
- Anti-Corruption Layer, a term from Domain-driven design
- Asynchronous connection-oriented logical transport, Bluetooth protocol

== Entertainment ==
- Austin City Limits, a television show
- Austin City Limits Music Festival

== Medicine ==
- Anterior cruciate ligament, a ligament of the knee
- Anti-cardiolipin antibodies
- ATP citrate synthase, or ATP citrate lyase, an enzyme

== Sports ==
- AFC Champions League Elite, Asian football competition
- American Cornhole League (cornhole involves the throwing of beanbags)
- Afghanistan Champions League (association football)
- Arena Coventry Limited, owner of the Coventry sports arena in England
- Arizona Complex League, a US baseball league

== Transportation infrastructure ==
- Aguaclara Airport in Casanare Department, Colombia (IATA code ACL)
- Acle railway station, UK (station code: ACL)
- Atlantic City Line, New Jersey, US

== Other uses ==
- Akar-Bale language, an extinct Great Andamanese language (ISO 639-3 code ACL)
- Australian Consumer Law
- Christian Liberal Alliance (ACL), a Romanian electoral alliance

== See also ==
- ACLS (disambiguation)
- ACI (disambiguation)
- AC1 (disambiguation)
