= SEAB =

SEAB may refer to:

- Singapore Examinations and Assessment Board, a Singaporean statutory board under the Ministry of Education
- Societe d'Exploitation et d'Application des Brevet, a defunct French motor vehicle manufacturer
