= ACLS =

ACLS may refer to:

- Acrocallosal syndrome, a genetic disease
- Advanced cardiac life support, a set of clinical interventions for the emergency treatment of life-threatening cardiovascular conditions
- American Council of Learned Societies, a federation of s company producing equipment for the semiconductor manufacturing industry
- Automatic Carrier Landing System
- Association of Canada Lands Surveyors, the licensing body for professional surveyors practicing on federal lands in Canada

== See also ==
- ACL (disambiguation)
- CLS (disambiguation)
- CL (disambiguation)
