= Career Advancement Accounts =

Career Advancement Accounts are an attempt to better educate low-income individuals created by George W. Bush as part of the American Competitiveness Initiative. It is being administered through Employment and Training Administration.
