= Renault 6 =

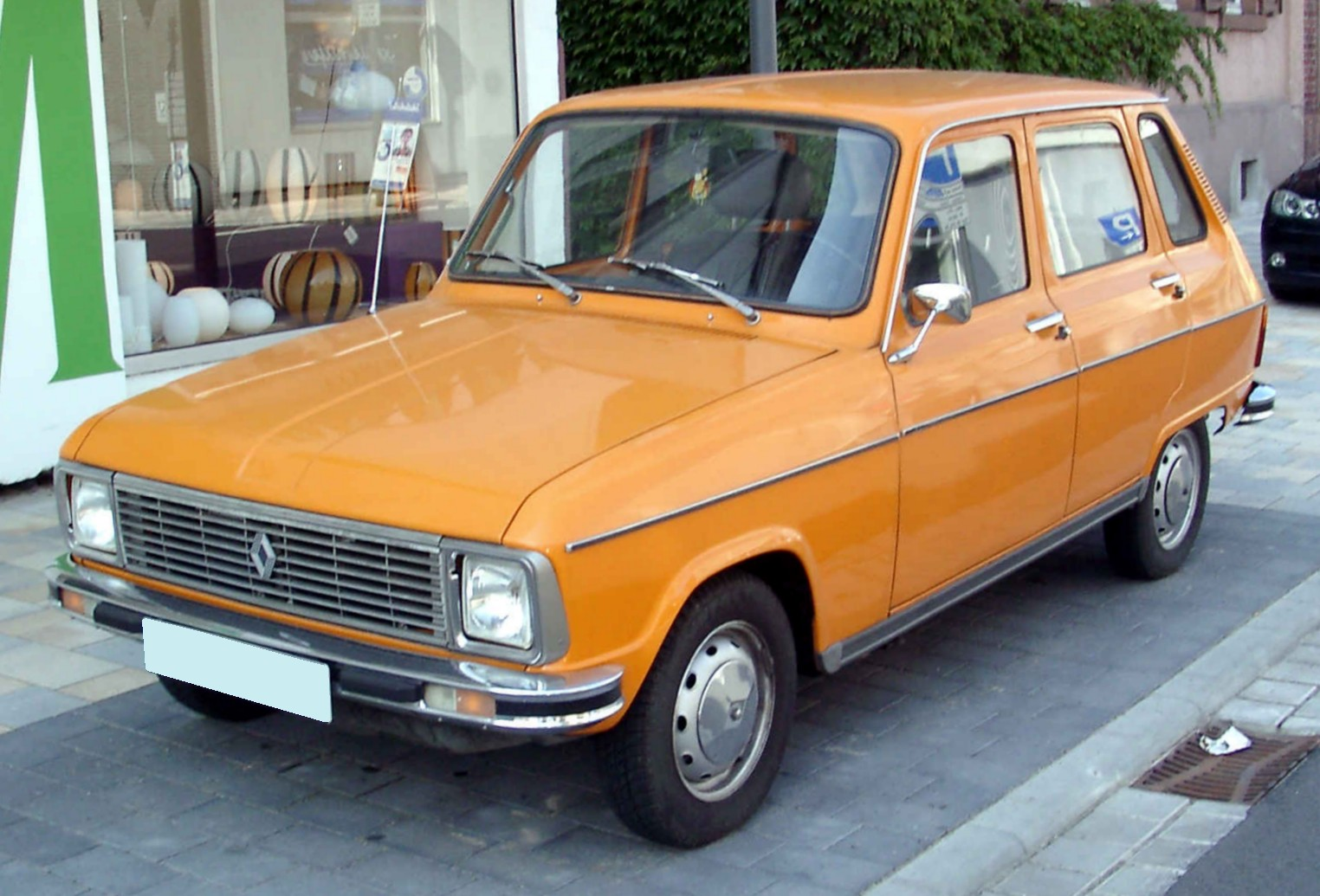
- 1974–1980 facelifted model

Overview
- Manufacturer: Renault
- Production: 1968–1986
- Assembly: France: Boulogne-Billancourt; Belgium: Haren-Vilvoorde (RIB); Spain: Valladolid (FASA-Renault); Argentina: Santa Isabel (IKA); Colombia: Envigado (SOFASA)

Body and chassis
- Class: C-segment subcompact economy family car
- Body style: 5-door hatchback
- Layout: Front-engine, front-wheel drive
- Related: Renault 4

Powertrain
- Engine: 845 cc 800-02/B1B I4; 956 cc C1C I4 (Spain); 1108 cc C1E I4

Dimensions
- Wheelbase: 2,400 mm (94.5 in) (left); 2,450 mm (96.5 in) (right)
- Length: 3,860 mm (152.0 in)
- Width: 1,540 mm (60.6 in)
- Height: 1,500 mm (59.1 in)
- Curb weight: 750 kg (1,653 lb)

Chronology
- Predecessor: Renault Dauphine
- Successor: Renault 5 Renault 14

The Renault 6 or R6 is a C-segment small family car, manufactured and marketed by French automaker Renault from 1968 to 1986. The Renault 6 used the Renault 4's platform, initially including its small 845 cc (51.6 cu in) engine, but its five-door hatchback body was larger and more modern. Visually it resembled the larger D-segment Renault 16.

The Renault 6 was launched at the 1968 Paris Motor Show, and was intended as an upmarket alternative to the 20 cm (8 in) shorter R4; and the R6 aimed to compete with the Citroën Ami 6 and the just launched Citroën Dyane (both based on the Citroën 2CV. It used a dashboard-mounted gear-lever with forward, over-the-engine reaching gear-shift linkage, principally the same as those used in both the Renault 4, and in the subcompact Citroëns it competed against.

The R6 was produced in France from October 1968 and sold in Europe until 1980, continuing elsewhere until 1986.

== Development ==
In its first two years of production, the R6 was criticised by the press for the R4-derived engine's lack of power in the heavier R6. In part because of this, the R6 had worse fuel economy than the larger but outdated, rear-engined Renault 8 saloon, which had a bigger engine and still performed better.

=== 1970 ===
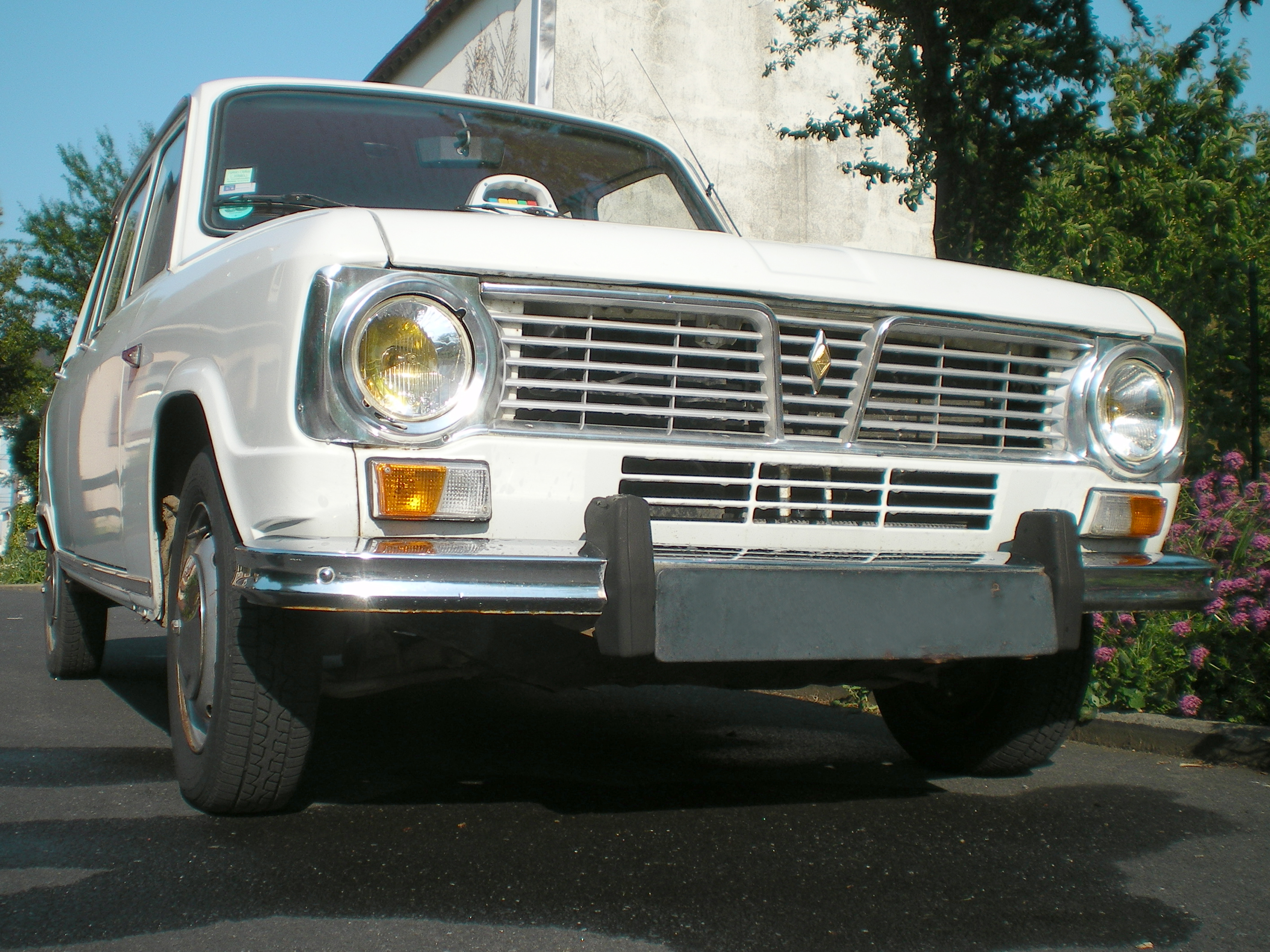
1971 Renault 6 1100, pre-facelift model with additional grille

A variant of the R6 using the 1.1 L (67 cu in) Cléon-Fonte engine (an engine used in the Renault 8 since 1962) was unveiled at the 1970 Paris Motor Show and was widely regarded as a big improvement. Power was increased from 34 to 45 PS (34 to 44 hp; 25 to 33 kW). The smaller engined model continued to be available until June 1979; it was sold as the Renault 6 L after August 1977.

The new car also had higher equipment levels as well as a new gearbox, cooling system and front disc brakes. The new cooling system necessitated a supplementary grille beneath the original one (in the place occupied by the license plate of the R6-850), while the disc brakes meant slightly redesigned rims with openings in them. For the Spanish market the R6 was made available with a 956 cc (58.3 cu in) engine, due to vehicles over 1,040 cc (63 cu in) receiving higher taxation under Spanish regulations. Later, a 1,037 cc (63.3 cu in) engine was fitted, and from 1981 the 1,108 cc (67.6 cu in) unit appeared in the 6 GTL. The one-litre version has 50 PS (37 kW) DIN and this engine was also fitted to Spanish-built 5s and 7s. The R6 continued to be built in Spain until 1986, with a total of 328,000 cars built there.

In 1973 the Teilhol/ACL-built 6 Rodéo appeared. This was an open, plastic-bodied utility vehicle in the style of the Citroën Méhari, which was sold by selected Renault dealers. A four-wheel-drive system by Sinpar was also available to the Rodéo as well as the 6 saloon.

=== Facelift ===
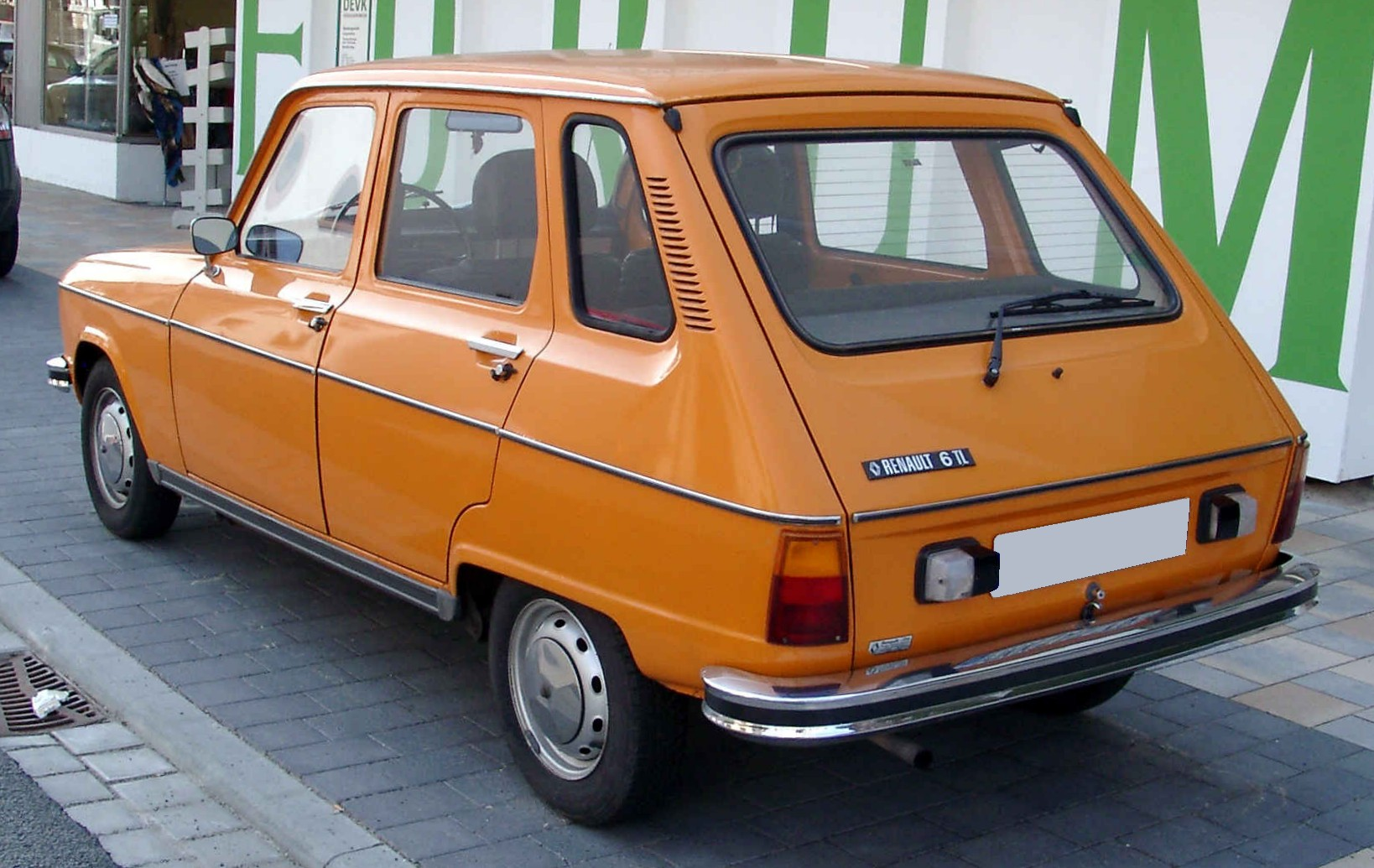
Renault 6, rear view of facelifted model

In June 1973 the R6 was revamped with square headlights, new rear lights, a plastic grille, and new bumpers. The front indicator lights also moved from between the bumper and the headlights to the bumper itself. The mechanicals remained untouched. In 1978 there was a very mild facelift, with a black grille being the most obvious change.

== International production ==
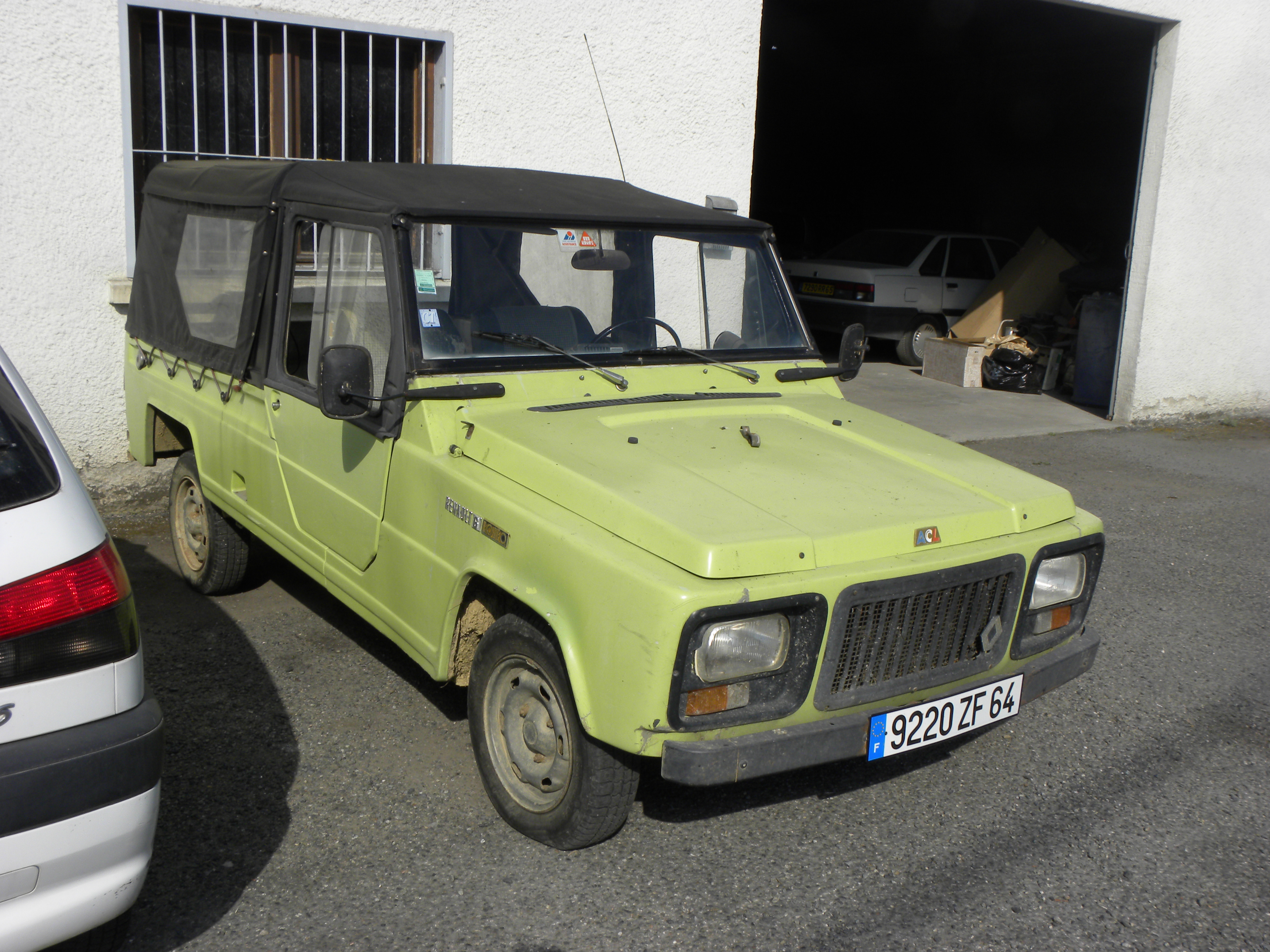
Renault 6 Rodéo

Production and sales in France and most of Europe ended in 1980 with no direct successor, but in Spain and Argentina the car was still produced and sold until 1986. Renault had launched a similar-sized hatchback, the Renault 14, in 1976 - aiming it directly at Volkswagen's highly successful new Golf, which popularised the hatchback bodystyle on cars of this size more than any other model in Europe at this time.

In Argentina, where the car was built by IKA-Renault, the original design (without the additional grille seen on European 1100s) continued until it received a facelift in 1978 along with a name change to "6 GTL". This meant a one-piece black grille, including the headlight surrounds, as well as black bumpers. Meanwhile, a 1397 cc engine (M1400) with 60 PS (44 kW) SAE was fitted to the Argentinian-made cars. From 1969 until 1978 it was fitted with an 1118 cc version of the Cléon engine (M1100) with 51 PS (38 kW). In total, 80,869 R6s were built in Argentina, with the pre-facelift model accounting for 57,534 (71 percent) of the total.

In Colombia the car was discontinued in 1984, when the Renault 9 started production.
