= ACI =

ACI may refer to:

== Arts and media ==
- Ace Combat Infinity, a combat flight simulation video game
- Air Crash Investigation, an alternate name for the television series Mayday
- Assassin's Creed (video game), the first entry in the long-running Assassin's Creed series

== Businesses and organizations ==
=== In aviation ===
- Aero Club of India, the apex body of all flying clubs and the governing body for air sports in India
- Aircalin, an airline (ICAO code: ACI)
- Air Cargo Inc., an organization that provides information to the freight forwarding industry
- Airports Council International, international trade group of the world's commercial aviation industry, based in Montreal, Canada
- Aviators Code Initiative, an organization advancing flight safety and professionalism
- Aviazione Cobelligerante Italiana, the air force of the Royalist "Badoglio government" in southern Italy during the last years of World War II
- Alderney Airport in Guernsey (IATA airport code ACI)

=== In education ===
- Agincourt Collegiate Institute, a secondary school in Toronto, Canada
- Albertson College of Idaho, now known as the College of Idaho, a small liberal-arts college in Idaho
- American Collegiate Institute, Izmir Amerikan Lisesi, located at İzmir, Turkey

=== Other businesses and organizations ===
- ACI (conglomerate), a Bangladeshi conglomerate
- ACI Worldwide, a payments software company
- Adriatic Croatia International Club, a chain of marinas in Croatia (ACI Marina)
- Albertsons Companies, Inc., an American supermarket chain
- American Concrete Institute, a non-profit standards-developing organization
- American Constitutional Initiative, a non-profit organization that promotes progressive change
- Anti-Corruption Ireland, a political group created by Gemma O'Doherty
- Arch Coal Inc., a U.S. coal mining company
- Aurora Cable Internet, a digital cable television, cable internet and VOIP provider in Aurora, Ontario
- Automobile Club d'Italia, a member of the Fédération Internationale de l'Automobile
- Allied Communications Inc., a defunct television syndicator

== Language ==
- Accusative and infinitive a.k.a. accusativus cum infinitivo, a construction in Latin grammar
- Aka-Cari language, an extinct Great Andamanese language

== Places ==
- Aci Castello (Sicilian: Jaci Casteddu), a city and comune in the Province of Catania in Sicily, Italy
- Acı, Pasinler
- Acireale, Sicilian city sometimes abbreviated Aci
- Adult Correctional Institutions, facilities operated by the Rhode Island Department of Corrections
- Alderney Airport in Guernsey (IATA airport code ACI)
- Jaci (river), also called the Aci

== Science and technology ==
- Adjacent-channel interference, power from a signal in an adjacent channel
- The nitronate moiety, alternately called ACI)
- Application container image, a specification for the format and environment of virtualization containers, initiated by CoreOS
- Autologous chondrocyte implantation, a medical treatment for articular cartilage damage
- Automatic Car Identification, a railroad barcode system that preceded the automatic equipment identification
- Cisco Application Centric Infrastructure, Cisco's implementation of software-defined networking

== Other uses ==
- Anti-Coercion Instrument, a regulation of the European Union aiming to protect the EU and its member states from economic coercion by third countries
- Acis (Italian: Aci) of Acis and Galatea, in Greek mythology
- American Competitiveness Initiative, a federal program intended to help America maintain competitiveness
