= Societe d'Exploitation et d'Application des Brevet =

French microcar manufacturer

SEAB (Societe d'Exploitation et d'Application des Brevet) was a manufacturer of plastic asr bodies and microcars. It was located in Villejuif, Paris.

== SEAB Flipper and Donky Microcars ==
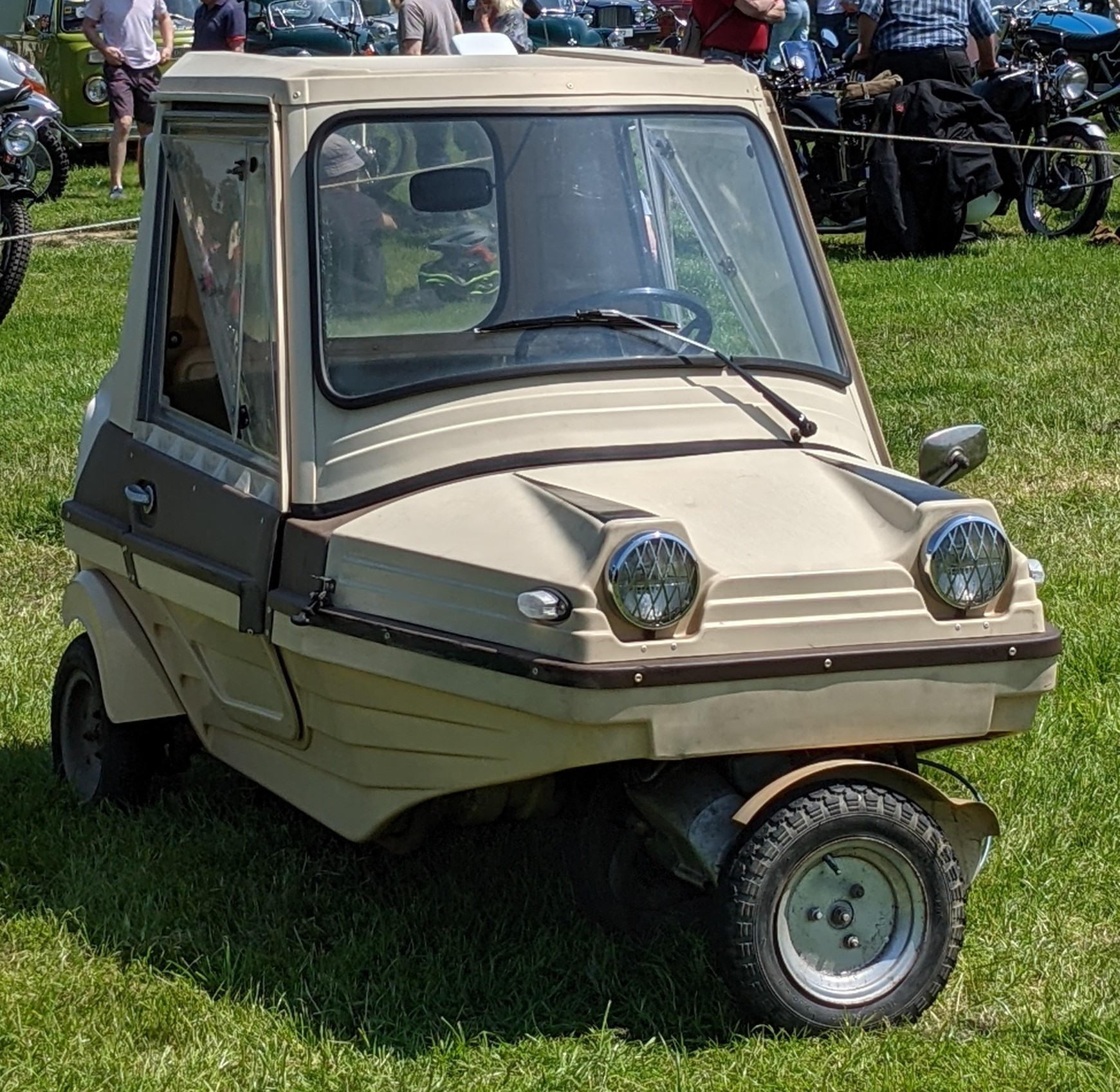
Flipper 1

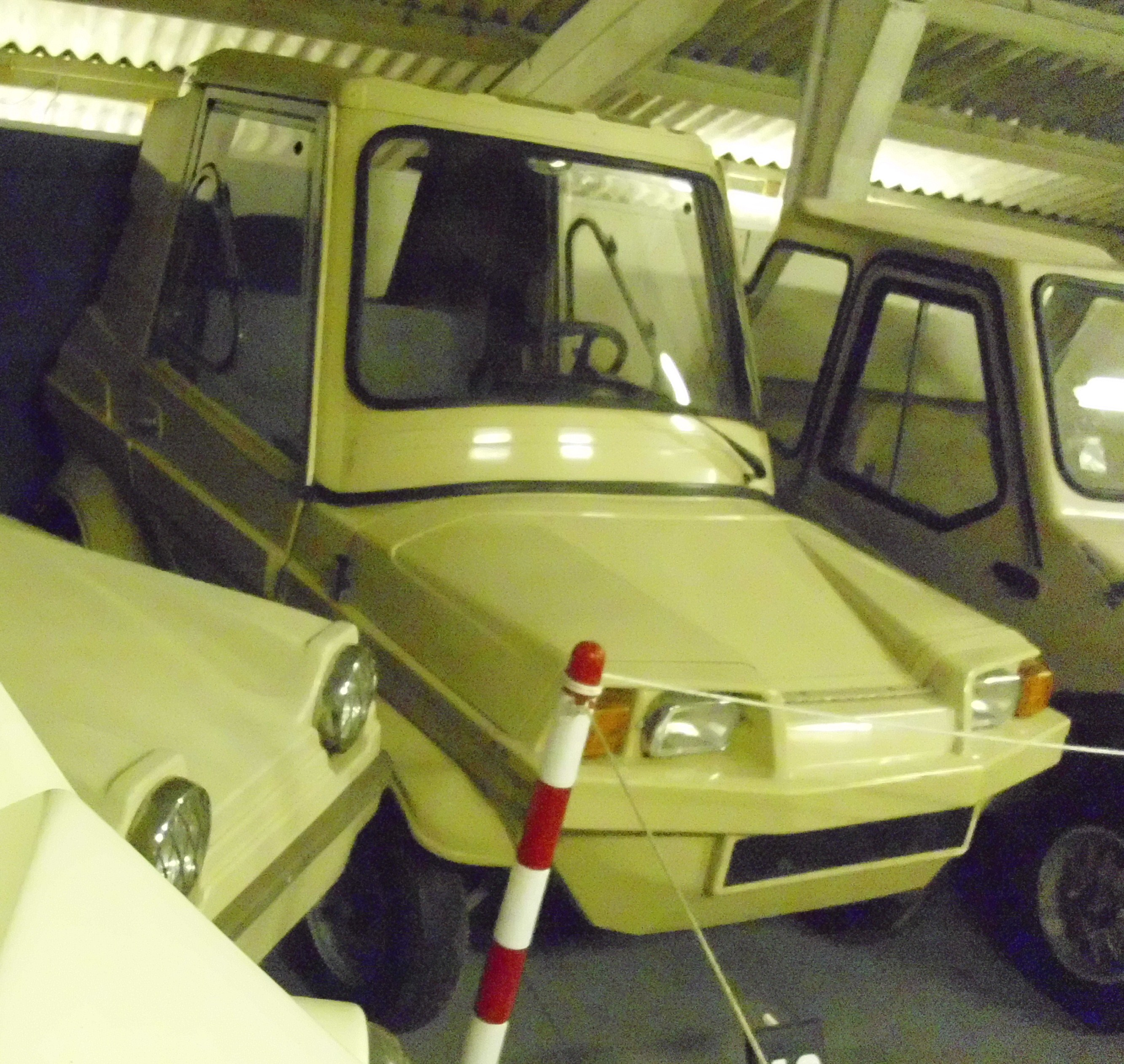
Flipper II

Between 1978 and 1984 SEAB manufactured the Flipper microcar. There were three versions. The Flipper 1 made from 1978 to 1980, the Flipper II from 1980 till production ceased in 1984, and the Donky, which had no doors, roof, or windshield. There was a third version of the Flipper, the Flipper III, made in 1984 but this did not go into production before the company ceased business.

The Flipper 1 was a front engine, front-wheel drive microcar. Powered by an air-cooled 47cc Sachs Adlx two-stroke engine through a 2 speed automatic transmission. It did not have a reverse gear because the steering turned 360 degrees.

Both the Flipper's were designed to meet France's unlicensed driver (voitures sans permis) rules The rules at the time allowed anyone over 14 without a drivers licence to drive cars meeting a set specification which included having a pedal power option like a bicycle in the style of a moped.

== Citroen Mehari ==
SEAB manufactured the bodies for the Citroen Mehari.
