= Renault Rodeo =

Off-road mini sport utility vehicle

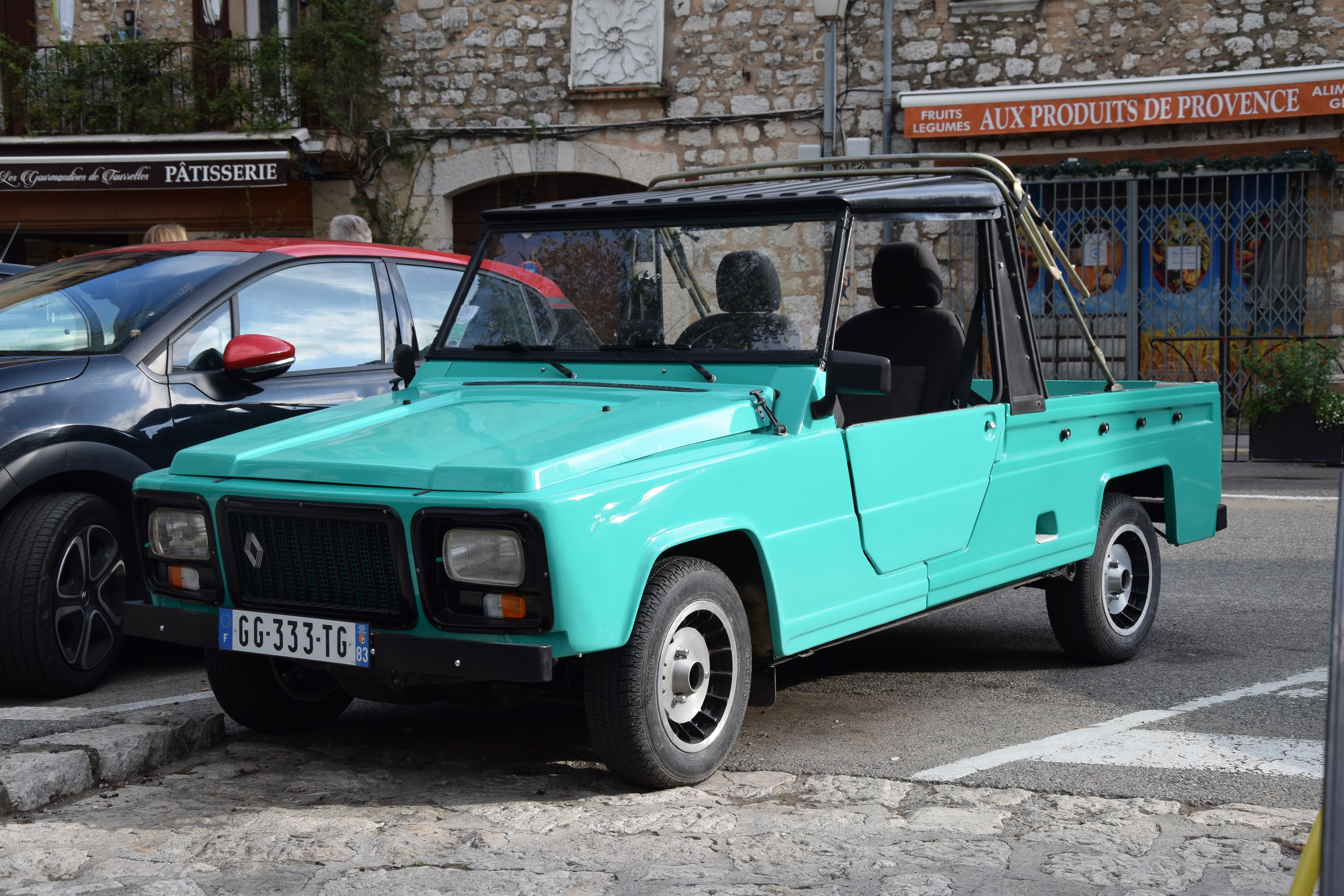

Overview
- Manufacturer: Renault
- Also called: ACL Rodeo; Renault Rodeo 4 Renault Rodeo 6 Rodeo 5 Rodeo Hoggar
- Production: 1970–1987; 60,000 produced

Body and chassis
- Class: Off-road mini SUV
- Body style: 2-door cabriolet SUV
- Layout: Front-engine, front-wheel drive / four-wheel drive
- Related: Renault 4

Powertrain
- Engine: Petrol (4 cyl.) : 845 cc (34 PS), 1108 cc (47 PS) and 1289 cc (45 PS)

Dimensions
- Length: 3,660 mm (144.1 in)
- Width: 1,589 mm (62.6 in)
- Height: 1,595 mm (62.8 in)
- Curb weight: 645 kg (1,422.0 lb)-860 kg (1,896.0 lb)

The Renault Rodeo was a series of off-road mini SUVs produced between 1970 and 1987 by ACL for Renault. In total there were three generations of the Rodeo. At first the car was called the ACL Rodeo and the name was changed to Renault Rodeo in July 1976. The vehicle was front wheel drive, but it could also be ordered with four-wheel-drive technology supplied by Sinpar.

== Rodeo 4 (1970–1981) ==
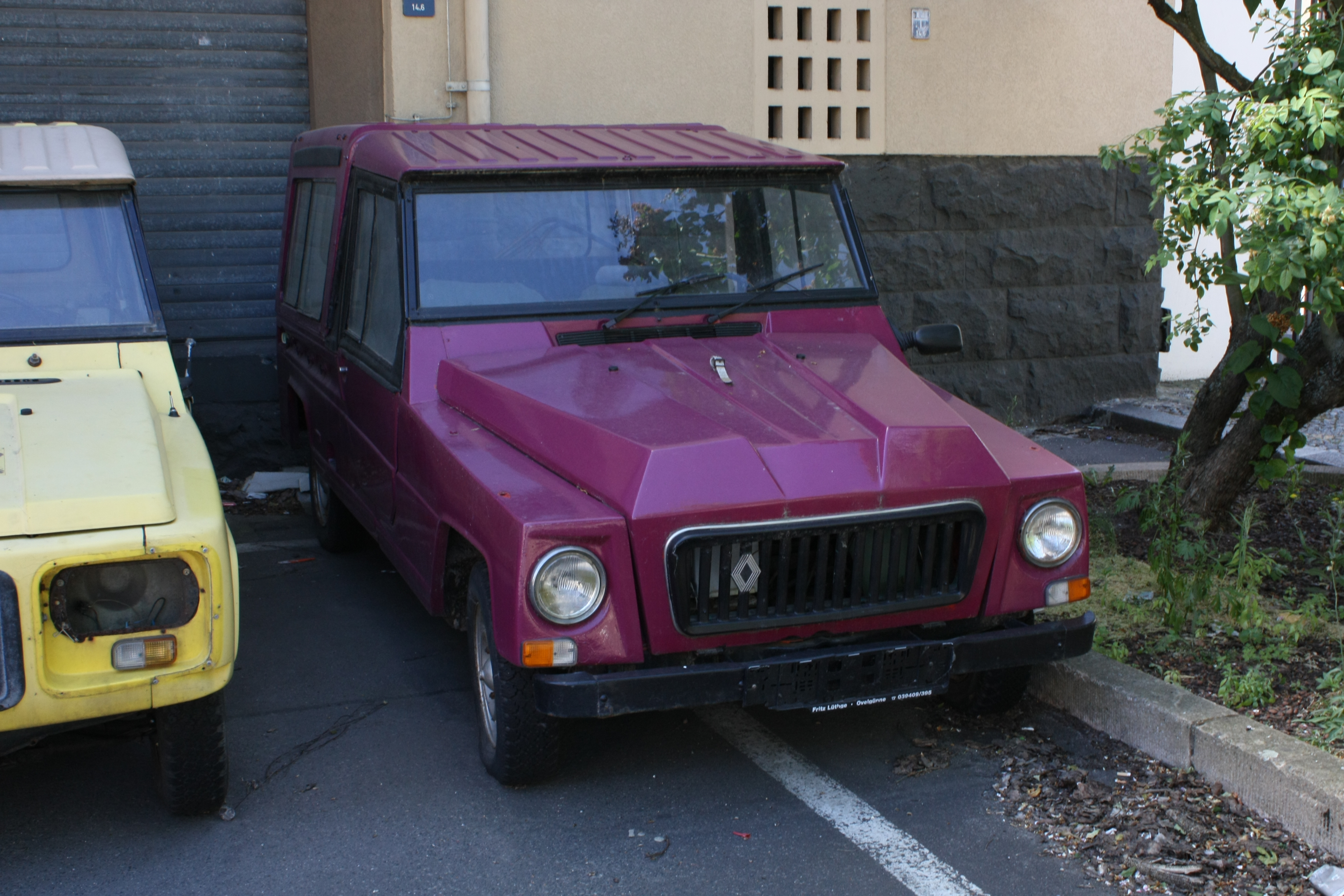
Rodéo 4

The original Rodeo 4 was based on the platform of the Renault 4 van, with an 845 cc engine.

== Rodeo 6 (1972–1981) ==
In 1972, a second model appeared, now known as the Rodeo 6. It was still based on the platform of the R4 van, but with the 1108 cc engine of the Renault 6. In 1979, the Rodeo 6 was improved and adopted the 1289 cc engine of the Renault 5. The Rodeo 4 and the Rodeo 6 coexisted from 1972 to 1981.

== Rodeo 5 (1981–1987) ==
A new model with a smaller and entirely new body replaced the Rodeos 4 and 6 in 1981, called Rodeo 5 or simply Rodeo. A limited series of all wheel drive versions were built in 1984 only, called the Rodeo Hoggar.

== The "Trafic" Rodeo ==
The Rodeo name was also used by Renault in Argentina to designate a local variant of the Renault Trafic (1st generation), which had a flat rear chassis and a flatbed with dropping sides and rear (similar to a pick-up). The flatbed was designed to be removable, allowing Rodeo buyers to use it as a rolling chassis for mounting specific rear compartments.

== See also ==
- Renault Farma
- BMC Mini Moke
- Volkswagen Type 181
- Fiat Ghia Jolly
- Citroën Méhari
- Meyers Manx
