= CLS =

CLS may refer to:

== Academic fields ==
- Critical legal studies, school of legal philosophy
- Constrained least square statistical estimator
- CLs method to set bounds on particle physics model parameters
- The .cls file extension, used to hold LaTeX manuscripts - see LaTeX § Compatibility and converters

== Education ==
- California Labor School, San Francisco, US 1942–57
- City of London School, UK
- Covington Latin School, Kentucky, US
- Crystal Lake South High School, Illinois, US
- Chicago Law School at The University of Chicago, US
- Columbia Law School at Columbia University, US
- Concordia Lutheran Seminary, Alberta, Canada
- Cornell Law School at Cornell University, US
- Critical Language Scholarship Program of the US State Department

== Societies and associations ==
- Caribbean Labour Solidarity, based in London, UK
- Chicago Linguistic Society
- Chinese Language Society
- Christian Legal Society
- Communist League of Struggle, US, 1931–1937

== Software and technology ==
- Cable landing station, where a submarine cable comes ashore
- Common Language Specification, Microsoft
- CLS (command) to clear computer screen in several environments
  - CLS (CONFIG.SYS directive), in DR-DOS
- Creative Lighting System, in Nikon speedlights

== Medical and science ==
- Computational Science, an academical research discipline
- Canadian Light Source, a synchrotron light source
- Clinical laboratory science, another name for Medical Technology or Medical Laboratory Science
- Combat lifesaver, US non-medical military role

== Music ==
- City of London Sinfonia
- CLS Music, a record label

== Transportation and vehicles ==
- Capsule launch system for space capsules
- Mercedes-Benz CLS-Class, automobile models
- CLS, the station code of Chester-le-Street railway station, England

== Business and finance ==
- CLS Group, a global financial market utility
- Celestica, New York Stock Exchange symbol
- CLS Communication, translation services
- CLS Holdings, UK investment company
- Core Labor Standards, ILO
- Crown Liquor Saloon, ornate bar in Belfast, Northern Ireland

== Construction ==
- Canadian Lumber Standard
