= Canadian Lumber Standard =

Type and standard/grade of processed and sawn lumber

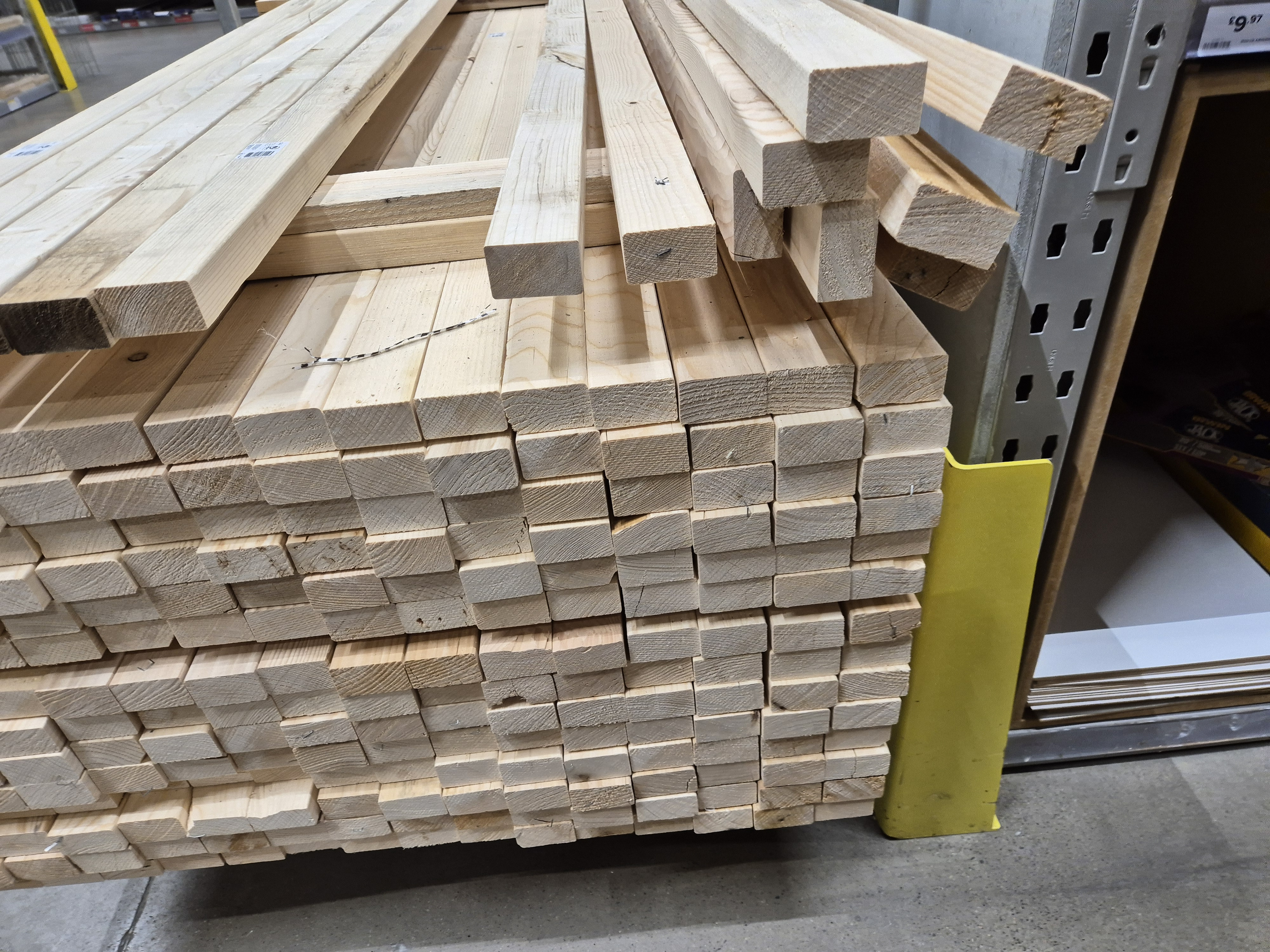
An example of CLS 16 sold commercially in a hardware/DIY shop in the United Kingdom

Canadian Lumber Standard, typically abbrievated as CLS, is a type and standard/grade of processed and sawn lumber (timber) used in many countries.

== History ==
CLS was originally a product of Canada used in the construction of sturdy timber-framed houses as rated by the Canadian Lumber Standards Accreditation Board (CLSAB). Following the end of the Cold War it was increasingly used by manufacturers in Baltic countries as a reference grade for export to the UK and other Western European countries. For these reasons, Latvian CLS, Swedish CLS and other European graded timber are now available, despite not originating from Canada. Most CLS now originates from Europe, including Scandinavia.

== Usage ==
CLS is primarily used in internal construction because of is strength and durability. As such, CLS is widely utilised as a general standard for timber suitable for wall studs, DIY and other construction projects, including housebuilding. It is very commonly employed in conventional timber frames for roofs, lofts and attics. It is typically used in the UK for timber wall studs.

For use outside, CLS timber should be treated for external use.

== Details ==
CLS timber is kiln-dried and is white wood. Tree sources include Fir, Pine and Spruce.

CLS is planed and finished with eased or rounded edges. CLS timber is commonly graded at two strengths, C16 or C24. C24 is the stronger and is typically more expensive.

It is often pressure treated and may also be treated with pesticides to stop insect and fungal growth.
