= Teilhol =

French automobile manufacturer

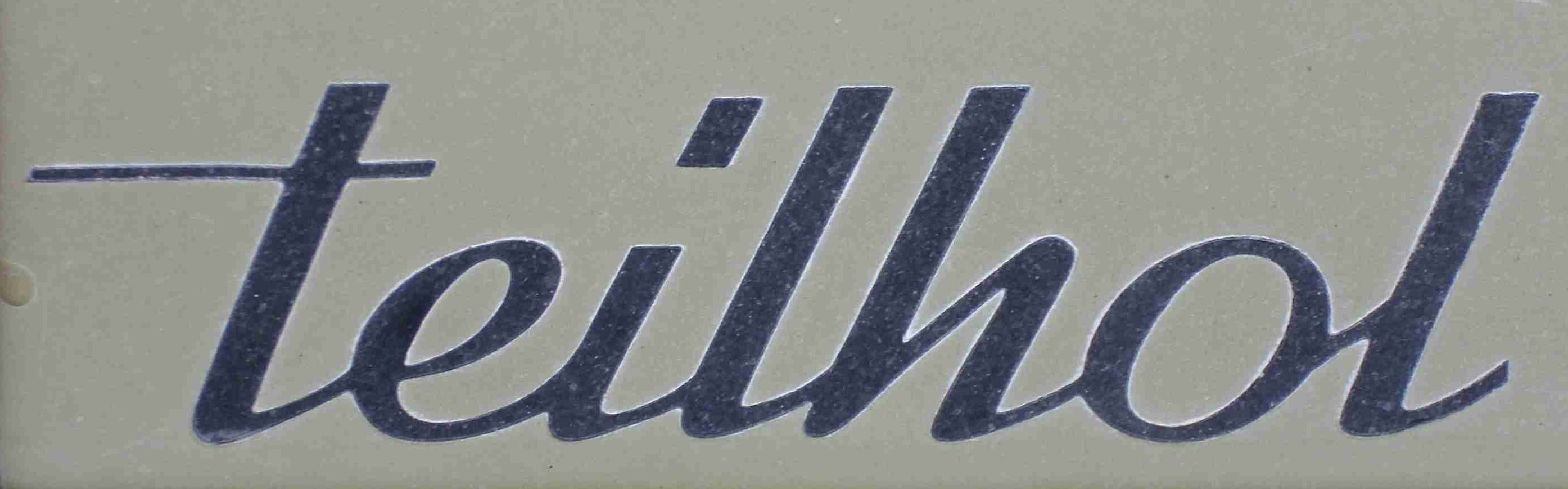
- Formerly: ACL
- Industry: Automotive
- Founded: 1958
- Founder: Raoul Teilhol
- Defunct: March 1990
- Fate: Bankruptcy
- Headquarters: Courpière, France
- Area served: France; Belgium
- Key people: Guy Teilhol
- Products: Cars
- Brands: Teilhol; Renault; Citroën
- Parent: 2CA

Teilhol was a French automobile manufacturer founded in 1958 by Raoul Teilhol as ACL (Ateliers de Construction du Livradois). In 1978, the company was renamed after its founder.

In 2006, 2CA (Concept Composites Auvergne) began making parts for Teilhol cars once again.

Raoul Teilhol died at age 86 on 18 April 2008.

== 1970s ==
=== Partnership with Renault ===
In the early 70s, Teilhol (then called ACL) finalised a partnership with Renault. This was initially to provide parts for current Renault vehicles, for example raised roofs for the Estafette van. Teilhol also later produced Renault 4 pickups.

Later, as beach cars such as the Citroën Méhari (which came out in May 1968) became more popular, Renault turned to Teilhol to provide a Renault-badged competitor. Teilhol therefore designed and began producing the Renault Rodeo 4 and 6, and later the 5 too. While the Rodeo 4 was based on the Renault 4, the Rodeo 6 and 5 were based on the Renault 6, with the 5 having a modernised design. However, all three variants used parts from various other Renault models to keep costs down. While the cars initially bore the names of both companies, this changed in the mid-70s, and ACL/Teilhol logos were no longer present on later models.

=== Citadine ===
Thanks to the security of the contract with Renault and increased income from the popular Rodeos, Raoul Teilhol was able to expand the production capacities of the company by opening factories and workshops in Ambert and Arlanc, the latter of which continues to produce Teilhol car parts as 2CA.

With the addition of new production lines and employees, Teilhol began making small city cars which did not require a driving licence, badged as TVE (Teilhol Véhicules Electrique). The most famous was the Citadine, an electric car which came out in 1972. Similar in apparition to the Isetta, the 3-wheeler car could fit 2 people and had a range of around 50 km, the distance between the Arlanc factory and Teilhol's headquarters in Courpière. It spawned many trims, including the 4-wheel Handicar for wheelchair users or the tiny Citacom flatbed. Additionally, TVE built the Messagette, which had an improved range of up to 100 km and was intended for use by city-dwellers to visit recreation getaways such as beaches or the countryside. A number of Messagettes were converted for utility purposes and sold to airports for use as service vehicle alongside Citacoms.

== 1980s ==
=== Simply ===
The Citadine and its variants never sold more than a few hundred models, and by the early 80s Teilhol decided to produce more conventional petrol and diesel microcars, primarily the Simply. Launched in 1981 with either a 49cc or 125cc engine (T50 and T125 trim respectively), this 4-wheeler proved a little more popular and led to diesel editions with larger engines (325 & 400D, TD and TLX).
