= AC1 =

AC1 may refer to:

- AC1, a ranking grading within the Royal Air Force between 1919 and 1964
- AC1, a candidate phylum of bacteria
- AC^{1}, a complexity class in circuit complexity
- AC1 Sentinel, an Australian cruiser tank
- AC-1, an IEC Utilization Category
- Action Comics #1, containing the first appearances of several superheroes
- Atlantic Crossing 1, an optical submarine telecommunications cable system
- Assassin's Creed (video game), the first game in the Assassin's Creed series
- The Shady Dragon Inn, a Dungeons & Dragons accessory with the code AC1
