= Aguaclara Airport =

- IATA: ACL; ICAO: none

Summary
- Location: Aguaclara, Colombia
- Elevation AMSL: 1,033 ft / 315 m
- Coordinates: 04°44′49″N 072°59′26″W

Map

Runways
Direction	Length		Surface
Direction	ft	m	Surface
	2,624	800

Aguaclara Airport (IATA: ACL) is an airport in Aguaclara, Colombia.
