= American Constitutional Initiative =

Advocacy group for a progressive view of the American constitution and laws

American Constitutional Initiative (ACI)
- Type: Non-profit, Advocacy group
- Services: Research, lobbying, direct-appeal campaigns
- Fields: Enhancing equality, preserving liberty, and protecting human rights

American Constitutional Initiative (commonly known as ACI) is a non-profit advocacy group that defines its mission as promoting intellectually sound change to American legal and political landscape. ACI employs research, lobbying, and direct-appeal campaigns to advocate a progressive vision of America's Constitution and laws.
