= Citroën Méhari =

Lightweight recreational and utility vehicle

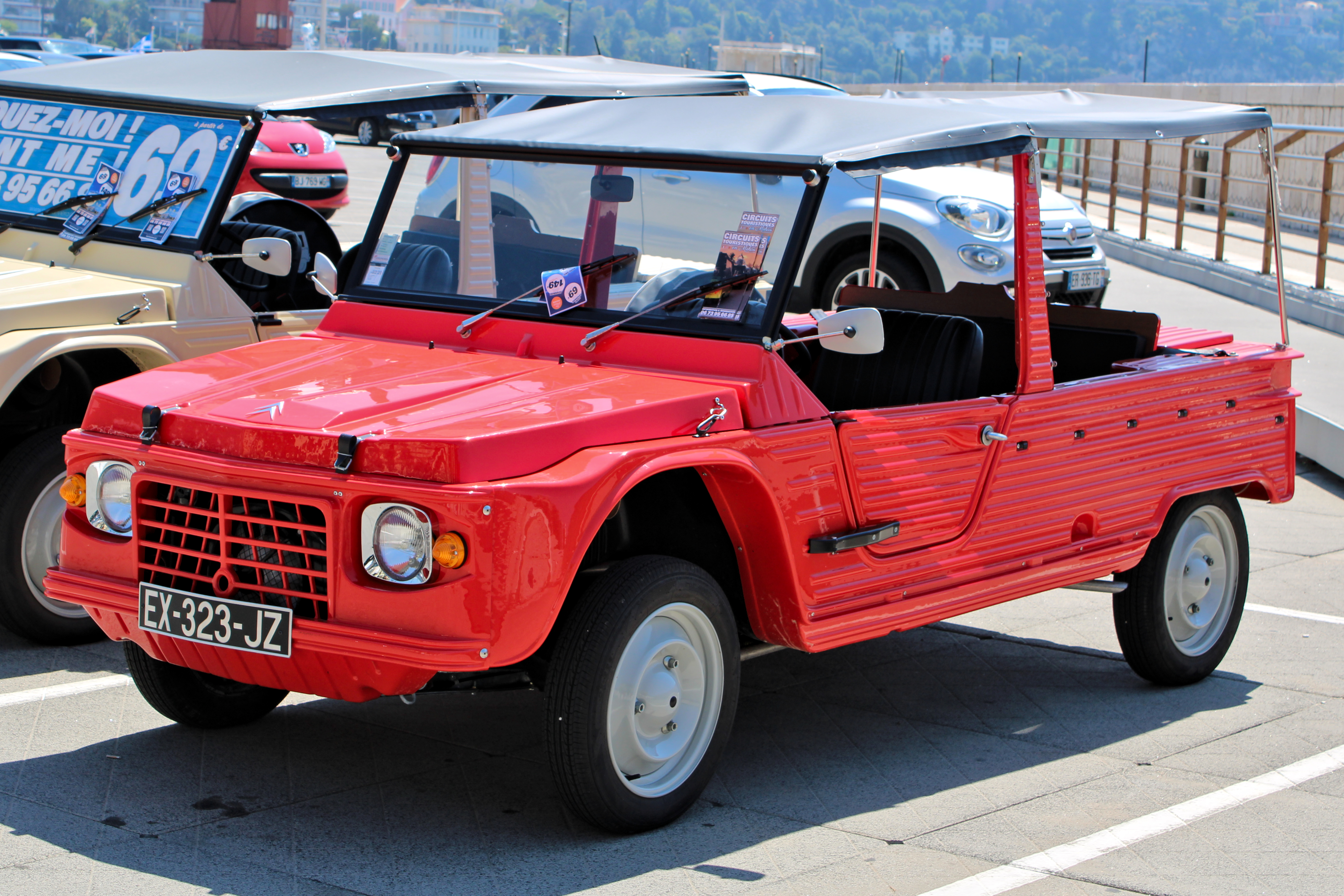

Overview
- Manufacturer: Citroën
- Production: 1968–1988
- Assembly: France: Villejuif (S.E.A.B.); France: Bezons (E.N.A.C.); France: Paris; France: Levallois-Perret; France: Rennes La-Janais; Argentina: Buenos Aires (Citroën Argentina, S.A./IES); Belgium: Forest (Citroën Forest factory); Portugal: Mangualde (Mangualde Plant); Spain: Vigo (Vigo Plant); Uruguay: Montevideo (Nordex S.A.); Yugoslavia: Slovenia (Smrtnik factory)
- Designer: Roland de La Poype

Body and chassis
- Class: Off-road compact SUV (J)
- Body style: 2-door utility roadster
- Layout: Front engine, front-wheel drive / four-wheel drive
- Platform: Citroën 2CV platform
- Related: Citroën Dyane 6; Baby Brousse; Citroën FAF

Powertrain
- Engine: 602 cc, air-cooled flat-2

Dimensions
- Wheelbase: 2,400 mm (94.5 in)
- Length: 3,520 mm (138.6 in)
- Width: 1,530 mm (60.2 in)
- Height: 1,640 mm (64.6 in)
- Curb weight: 570 kg (1,256.6 lb)

Chronology
- Successor: Citroën E-Méhari (for Méhari Nameplate)

The Citroën Méhari is a lightweight recreational and utility vehicle, manufactured and marketed by French carmaker Citroën over 18 years in a single generation. Built in front-wheel (1968–1988) and four-wheel drive (1980–1983) variants, it features ABS plastic bodywork with optional/removable doors and foldable, stowable, fabric convertible top.

The Méhari weighed approximately 535 kg (1,179 lb), and featured the fully independent suspension and chassis of all Citroën 'A-Series' vehicles, using the 602 cc (36.7 cu in) variant of the flat twin petrol engine shared with the 2CV6, Dyane, and Citroën Ami. The car also uses the Dyane's headlights and bezels, and 4WD units differ externally by having the spare wheel on the hood, in a molded recess.

The car is named after the fast-running dromedary camel, the méhari, which can be used for racing or transport. Citroën manufactured 144,953 Méharis between the car's French launch in May 1968 and the end of production in 1988.

The Méhari and variants were built in many additional variants (under license or not), in a host of other countries, including versions with a fiberglass instead of ABS body, and 2WD version with spare wheel on the hood.

== Production history ==
=== Origin ===
The Méhari was designed by French World War II fighter ace Count Roland de la Poype, who headed the French company SEAB - Société d'Etudes et d'Applications des Brevets. He developed the idea of using a plastic, rather than fiberglass body. De la Poype evaluated the fashionable Mini Moke and was determined to improve on its low ground clearance, hard suspension, and rust-prone body.

This company was already a supplier to Citroën, and SEAB developed a working concept of the car before presenting it to its client. SEAB used the somewhat stronger chassis of a 2CV Fourgonette; production cars used that of the Dyane 6.

In 1977, for the 1978 model year, the Mehari was facelifted, with a revised front and grille.

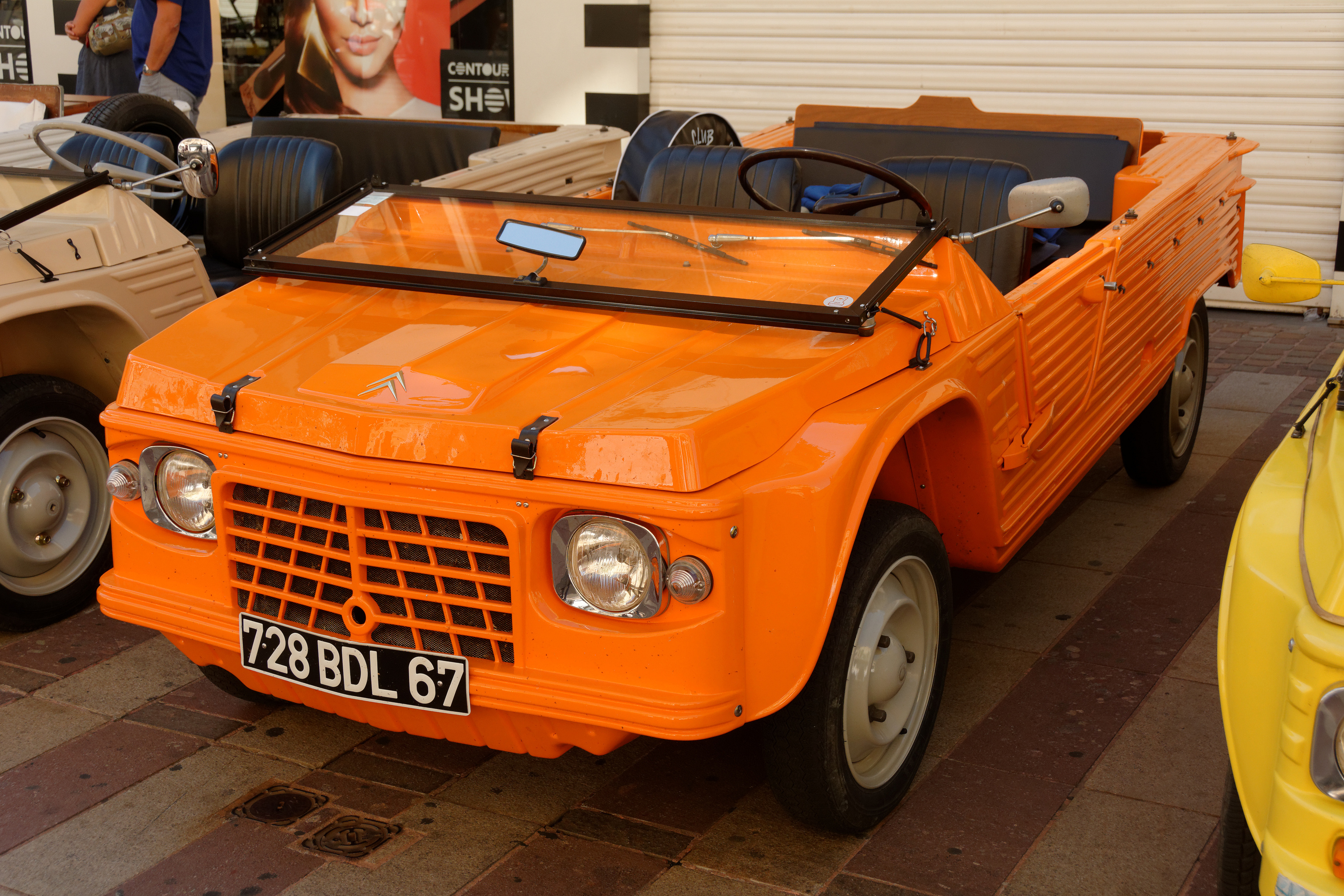
Pre-facelift Méhari (front)

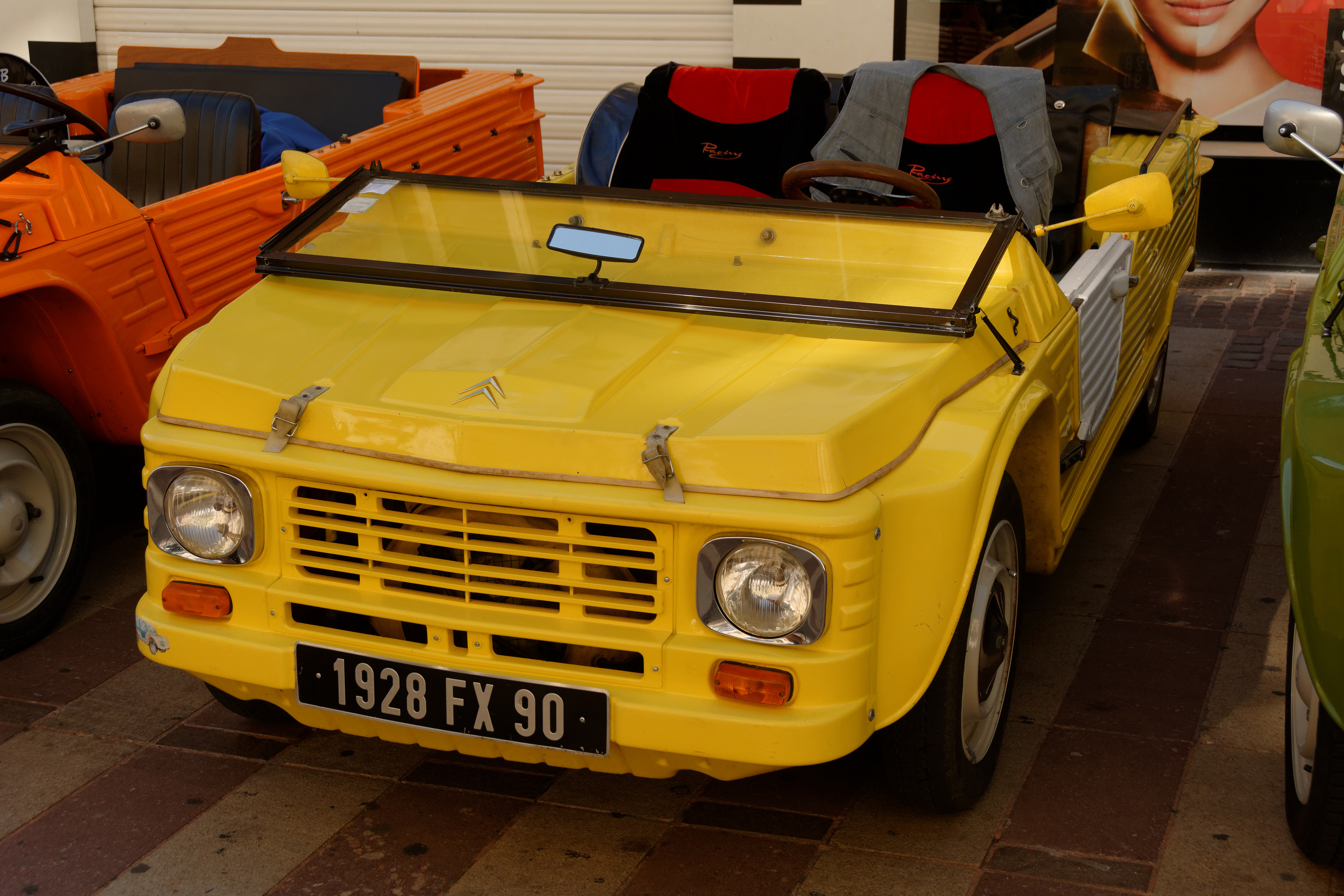
Facelifted Méhari (front)

=== French military ===
The French Army purchased 7,064 Méharis – some of which were modified to have 24 V electric power to operate the two-way radio.

=== Méhari 4x4 ===
In 1979, Citroën launched the Méhari 4x4 with drive to all four wheels. Unlike the Citroën 2CV Sahara 4x4, this car had only one engine, rather than one engine per axle. The 4x4 used the heavier Ami Super's floorpan and suspension parts, and also received inboard rear disc brakes. At the time, the Méhari 4x4 was one of the few 4x4s with four-wheel independent suspension. The car had all wheel disc brakes.

The body is distinguished by its spare wheel mounted on the specially designed bonnet, its steel bullbars front and rear, and tail lights similar to those of the Citroën Acadiane van. For 1982 it also received flared wheel arches and larger, optional tyres.

The 4x4 version has a gearbox with four normal speeds and a three-speed transfer gearbox for crossing slopes of up to 60 percent. To help protect the engine while using the reduction gear, the 4x4 also received a standard tachometer.

Méhari 4x4 production stopped in 1983. The French Army, the intended main customer, was not interested. The 4x4 therefore only sold to private buyers, in small numbers as it cost twice as much as the standard, two-wheel drive car.

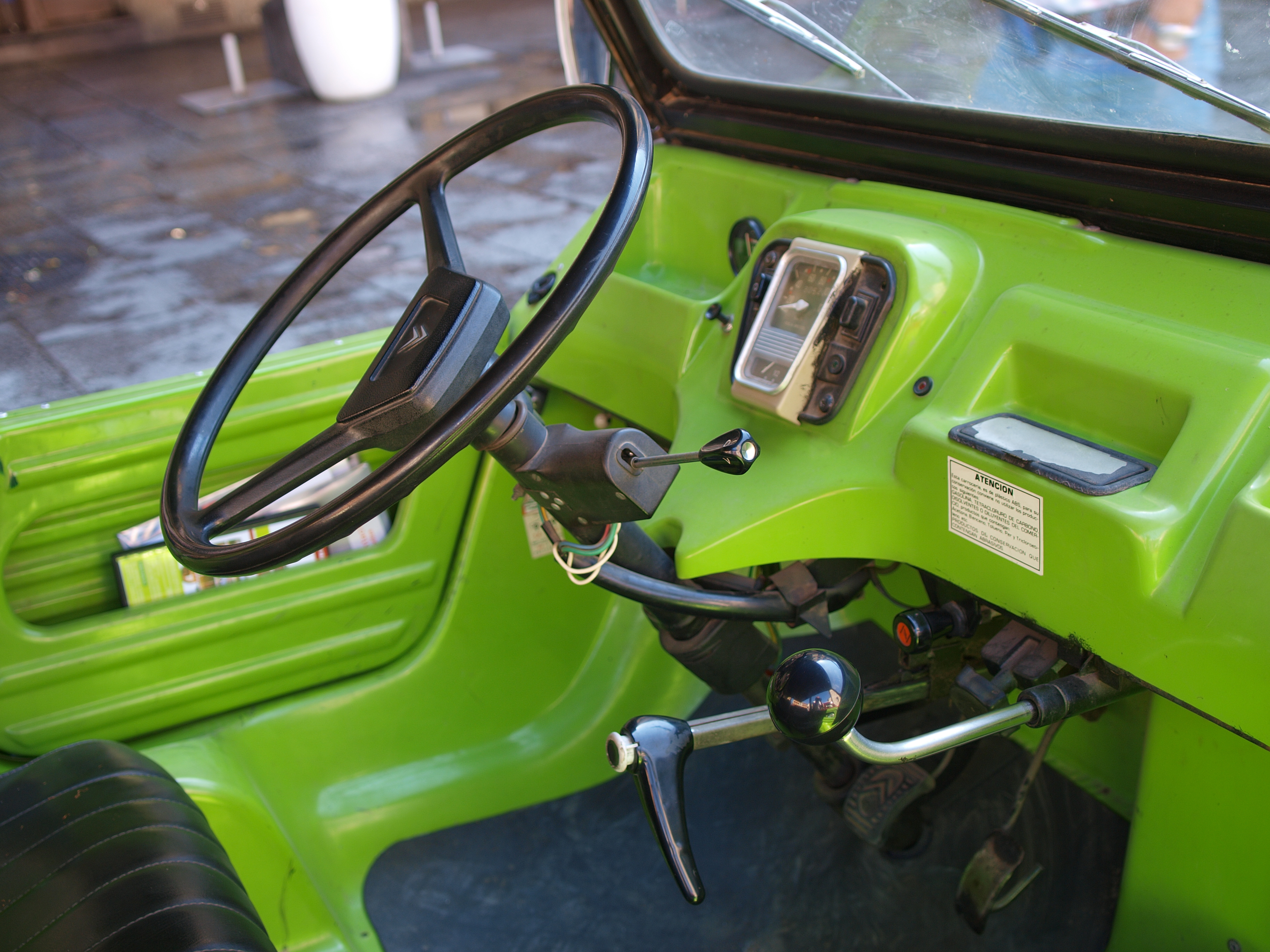
Dashboard of a 2WD Méhari

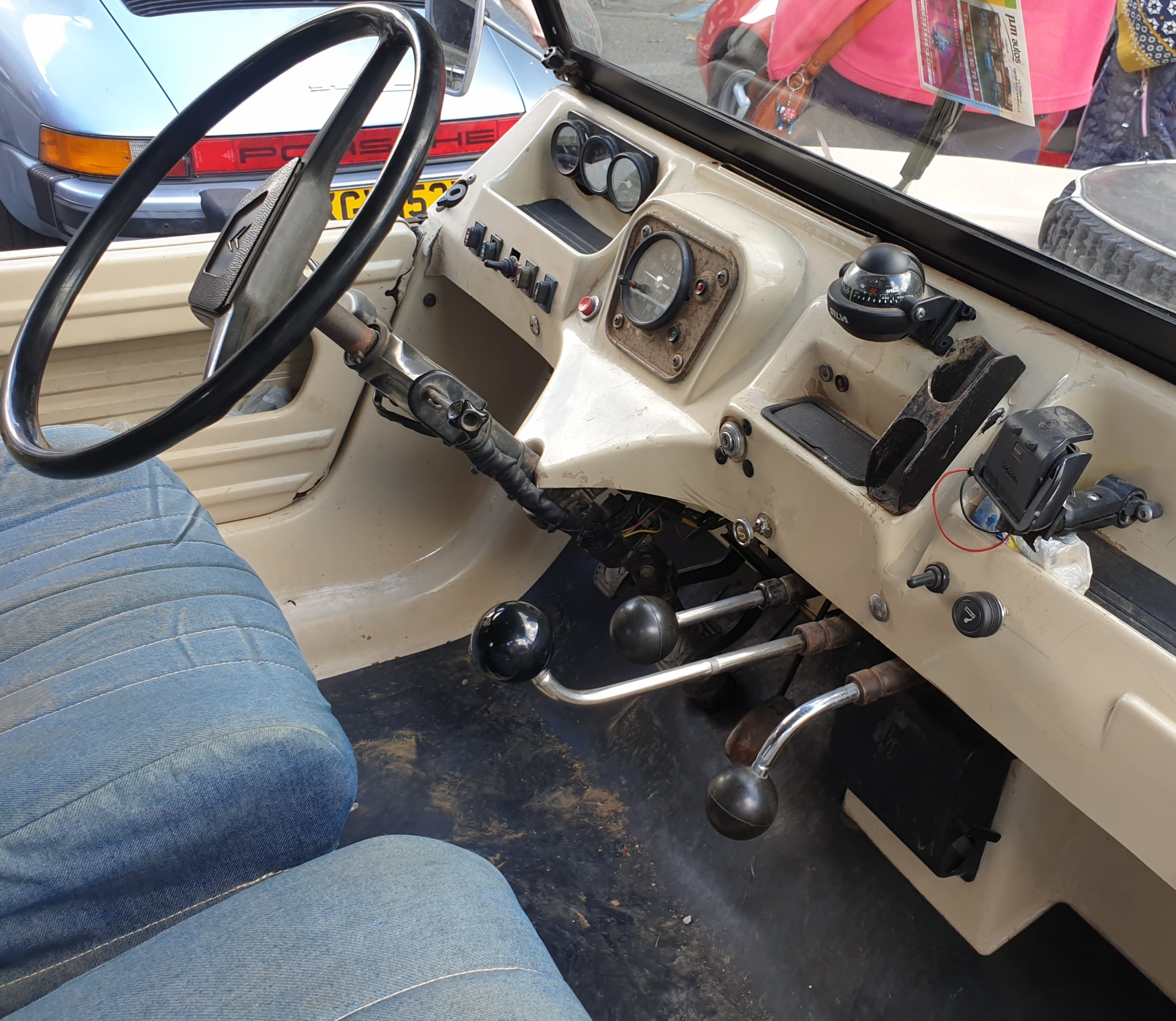
Dashboard of 4WD Méhari interior – note levers and additional gauges

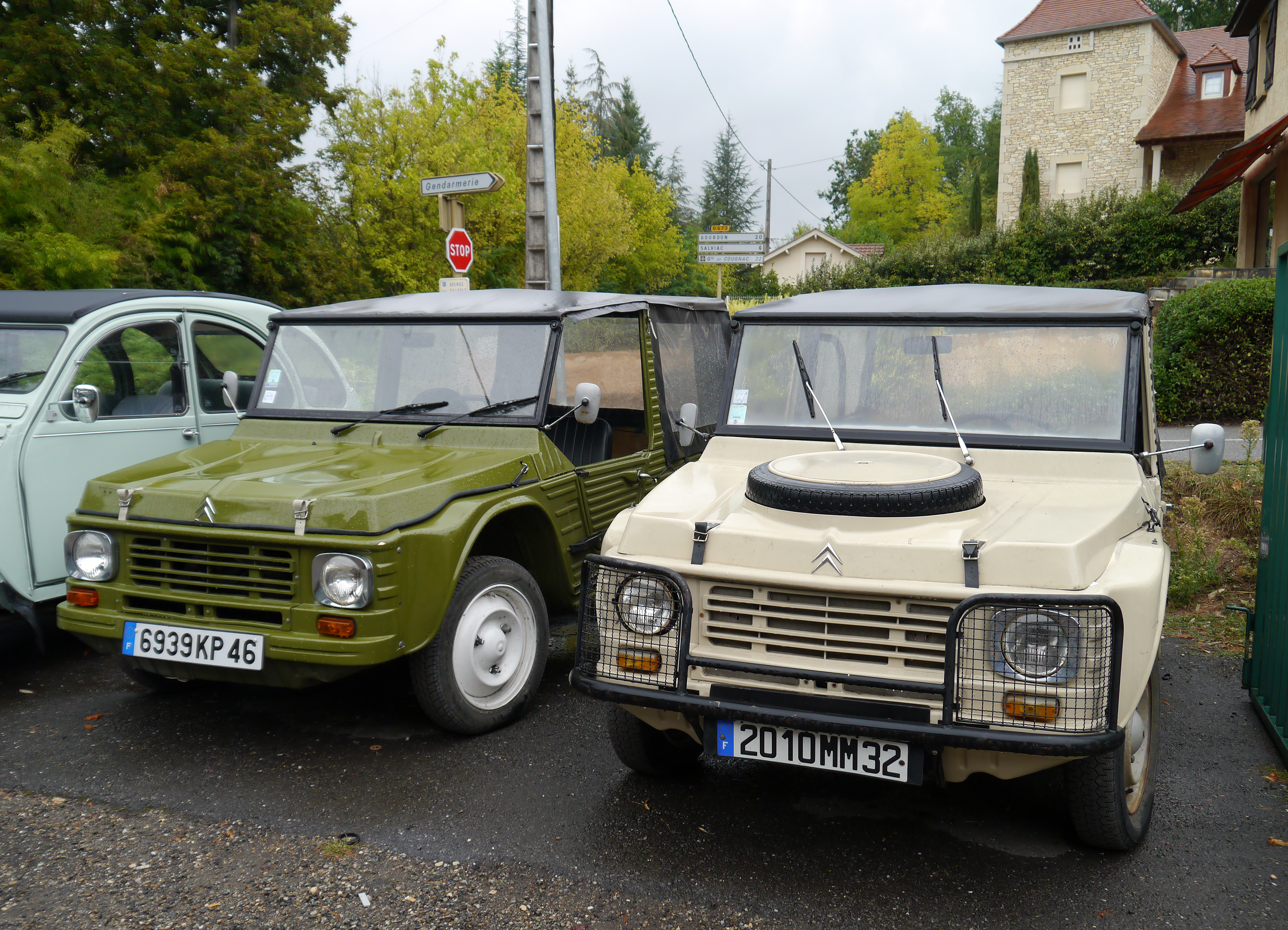
2WD left, 4WD right, with spare wheel on the bonnet

=== Limited editions ===
Two limited-edition versions of the Méhari were sold:

- Azur: initially planned in a limited edition of 700 copies, the Mehari Azur was then integrated into the normal range given the great success achieved. The Azur was distinguished from the other Méhari by its white body with blue doors, grille and soft top. The seats were upholstered in blue-and-white striped fabric.
- Plage: at the same time as the Azur the Plage series was introduced, reserved for the markets of the Iberian Peninsula. The car, produced in Mangualde, in Portugal (where a new production node for the Méhari had been activated). It was characterized by a yellow body with white rims.

== International production and sales ==
=== Irish military ===
Citroën Méhari was also in service with the Irish Defence Forces, which bought a total of 12 vehicles in the late 1970s; most were sold at auction about 1985, but one is retained at the Defence Forces Training Centre in the Curragh Camp, County Kildare, Ireland.

=== Portugal ===
The Méhari was produced at the Mangualde factory, where it built 17,500 copies.

=== Spain ===
The Méhari was produced at the Vigo factory from late 1969 to 1980, of which 12,480 copies were produced. Imported models would continue to be marketed until 1987.

=== UK ===
The Méhari was never type approved for sale in the UK. The 2CV on which it was based also had a gap in UK sales, from 1961 to 1974.

=== United States ===
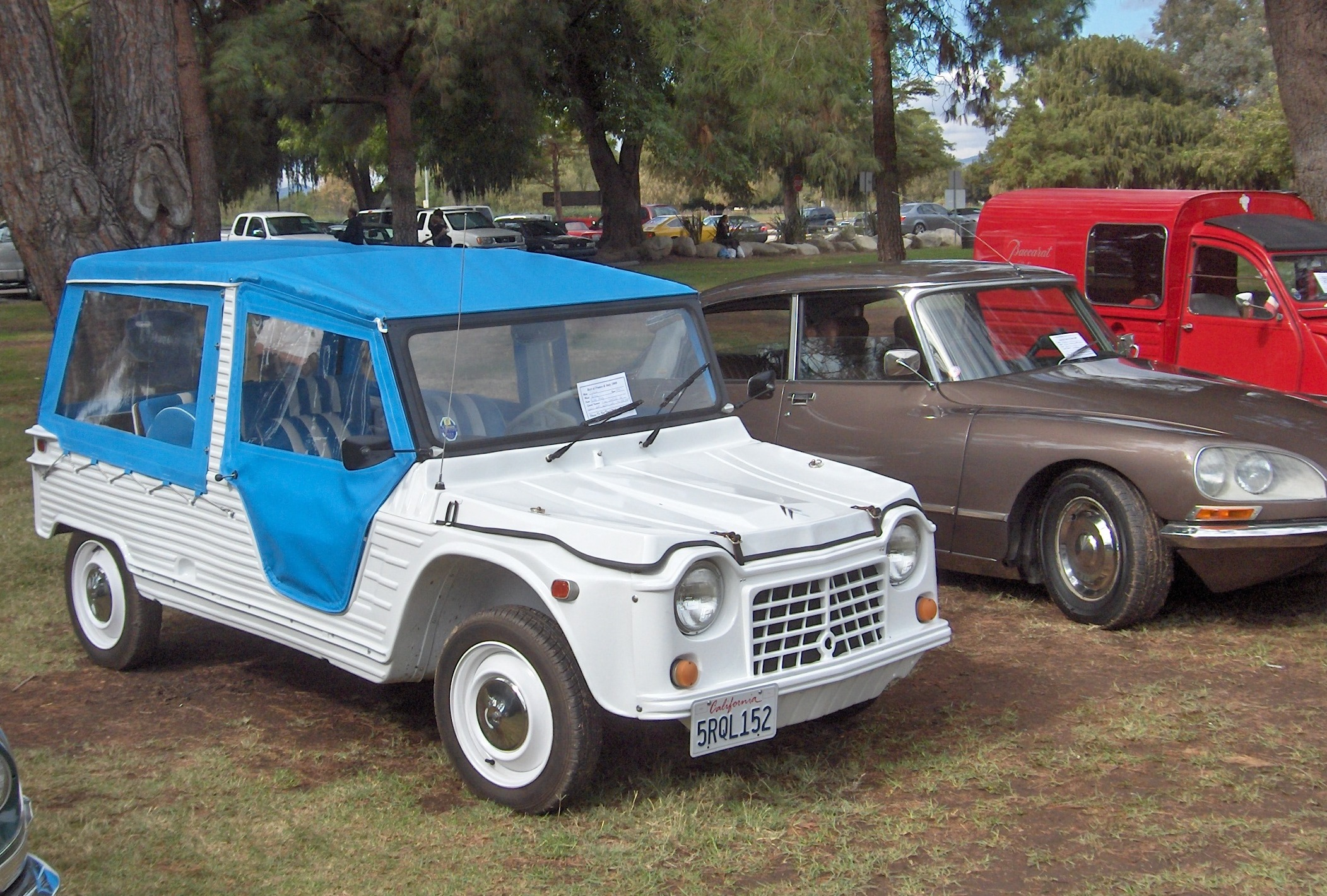
1970 Citroën Mehari, US model

Citroën marketed the Méhari in the United States for model years 1969–1970, where the vehicle was classified as a truck. As trucks had far more lenient National Highway Traffic Safety Administration safety standards than passenger cars in the US, the Méhari could be sold without seat belts. Budget Rent-A-Car offered them as rentals in Hawaii. Hearst Castle, in San Simeon, California, used them as groundskeeper cars.

Elvis Presley featured a US Model Méhari prominently in his 1973 broadcast Aloha from Hawaii Via Satellite

Revisions for the US market included:

- Altered front panel with larger 7" sealed-beam headlamps
- Lateral side marker lights
- Special boot lid with room for US registration plate and a lamp (Lucas) either side of it.
- Straight rear bumper.
- Two-speed wiper motor.
- Reversing lights.
- Hexagonal yellow "cats eyes" on front and rear sides.

=== Argentina and Uruguay ===
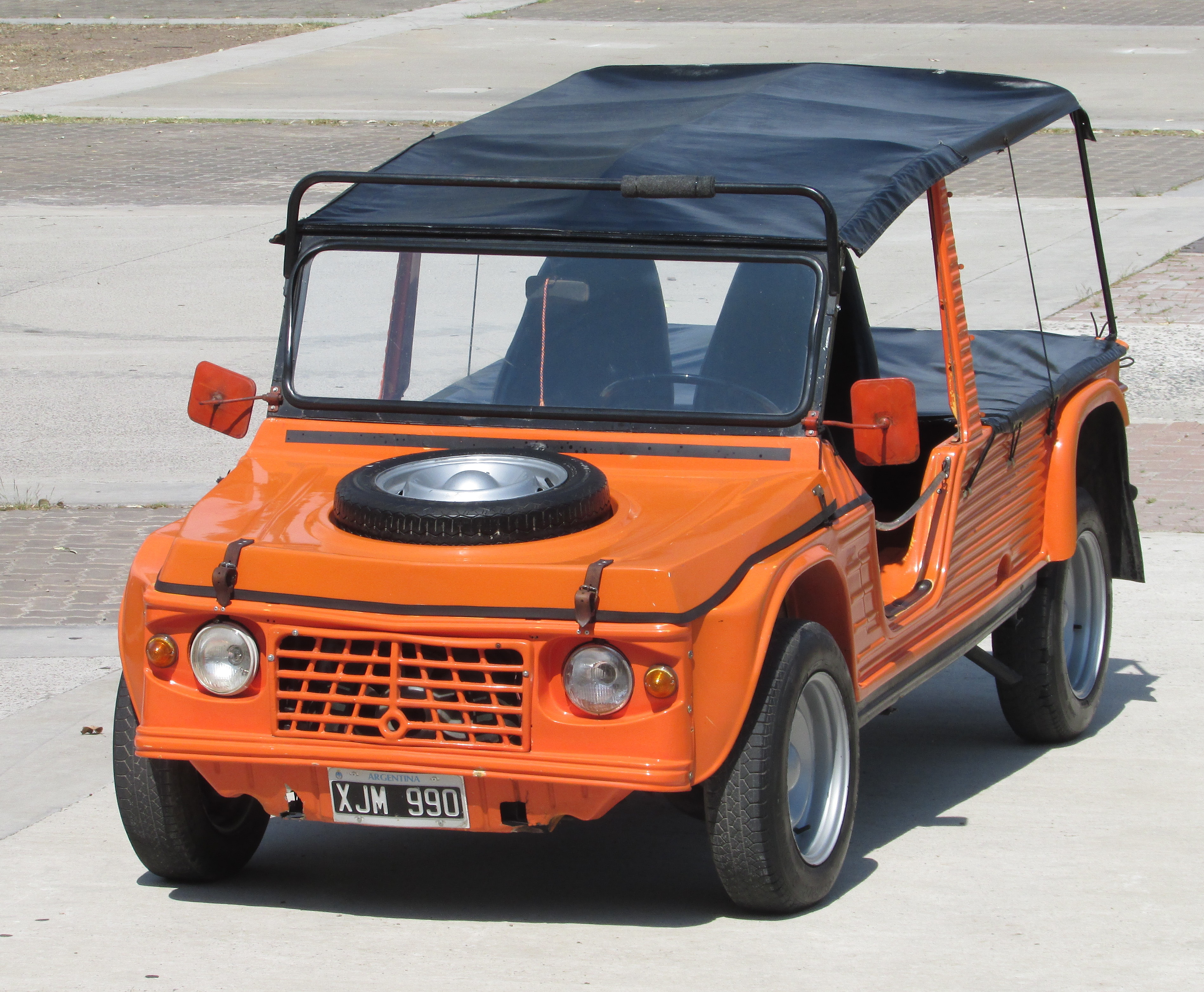
Méhari Argentina – note spare wheel on indented hood

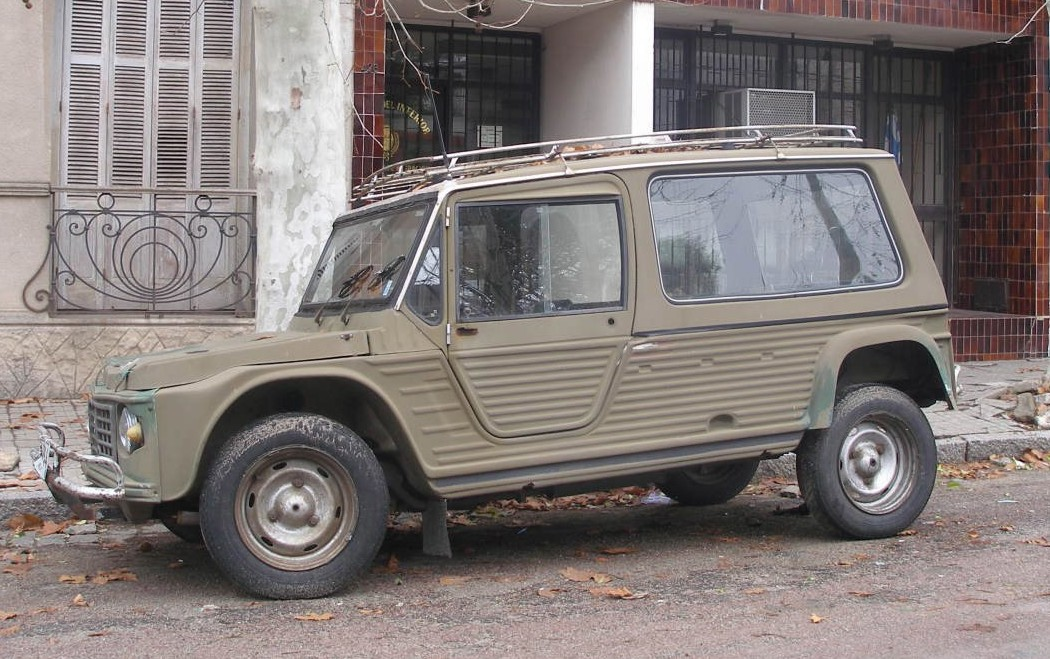
Méhari Ranger with distinctive hardtop, Uruguay

The Méhari was manufactured in Argentina by Citroën Argentina SA from 1971 to 1980, with 3,997 units produced. The body of the Argentine Méhari was manufactured in Uruguay by Dasur, and the chassis were sent from Argentina so that the Nordex company could make the final assembly. Nordex also built 14,000 units of the Méhari, of which 5,000 remained in Uruguay and 9,000 went to Argentina within the CAUCE trade agreement.

The Argentine Méhari used the 3CV (Citroën Ami) platform, with all its mechanics. Consequently it had drum brakes, and not discs, unlike its French predecessor. Its bodywork was mostly similar to its French sister, but made of fiberglass instead of the French original ABS plastic, as the necessary equipment to heat and cut plastic parts of this size was unavailable in the region. In addition, the rear wheel arches have a different shape, and the spare wheel was mounted on the hood, thus gaining luggage space. Contrary to French units with the spare on the hood, these were only front-wheel drive. A removable hardtop version was developed under the name Méhari Ranger.

In 1971 at the time of its presentation, the only color was red, although later some blue examples were made for the police department of Tucumán province. Coinciding with the launch of the 3CV M-28 in 1978, the Méhari II was launched, distinguished by its widened rims and its orange color. This model was advertised as la Naranja Mecanica ("The Clockwork Orange").

Citroën left Argentina following the collapse of the economy in the late 1970s. The Argentine company Industrias Eduardo Sal-Lari (IES) resurrected the model in 1984, this time under the name Safari or Gringa, which was produced until 1986. It maintained practically all the technical characteristics of the original model, but with flared wheel arches and big tires.

=== Baby Brousse & FAF ===
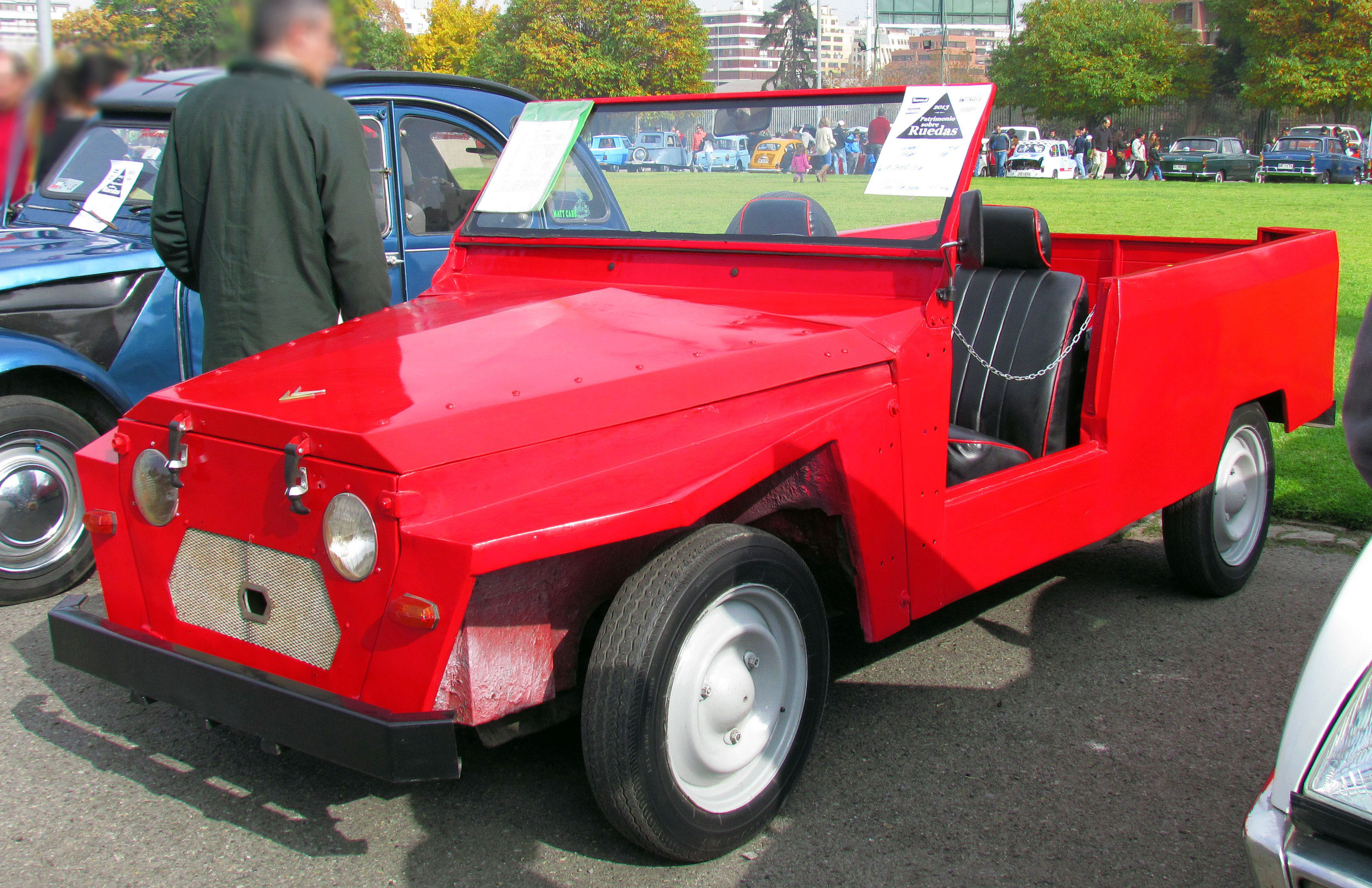
1974 Citroën Yagán

Citroën built metal-bodied variants of the A-Series, in many ways steel-bodied Méharis, in many countries around the world, including the Baby Brousse and the Citroën FAF.

Developed in Chile under the order of Salvador Allende in the year 1971 and produced between 1972 and 1974, the FAF Yagán version was inspired by the French Mèhari. At first, the possibility of importing the Mehari bodywork from Uruguay was considered, but its high price discouraged those responsible for the project. Despite being an artisanal vehicle – the Yagán was made entirely by hand and no type of dies or molds were used – some 1,500 units were produced at its factory in Arica, where other Citroën vehicles were also assembled, such as the Ami 8 and the 2CV. Distinctive about the Yagán was that the base chassis was that of the Citroën 2CV rather than the Méhari, and that the goal of 50% Chilean componentry was reached. Its failure was due to the high unit cost compared to higher quality models, in addition to the failed incorporation into the Chilean Army.

== Post-production, imitations ==
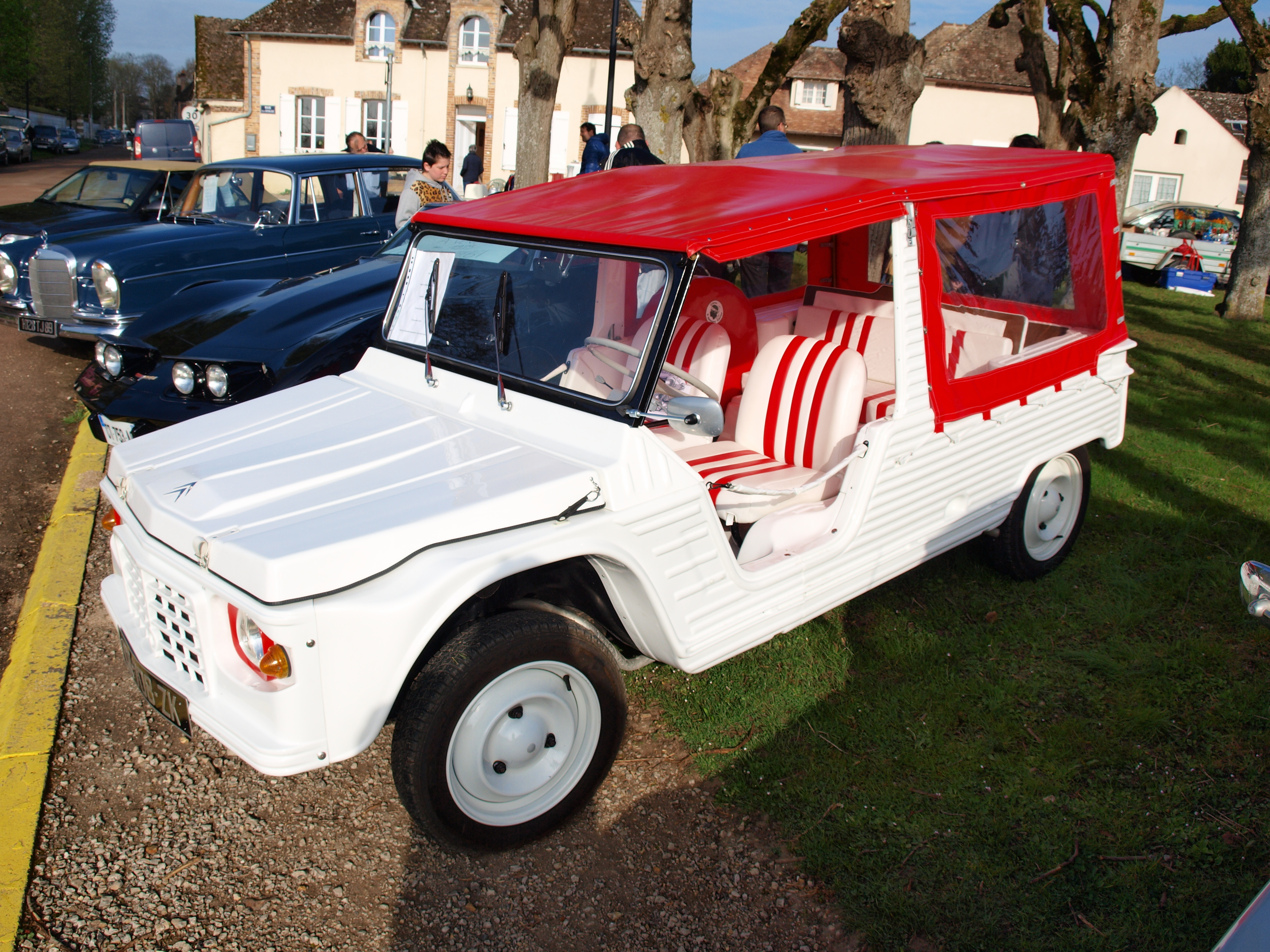
Restored Méharis often have novel colour schemes.

The Méhari ended production in 1988 with no replacement. This left a gap in the market, that others have tried to address.

=== VanClee ===
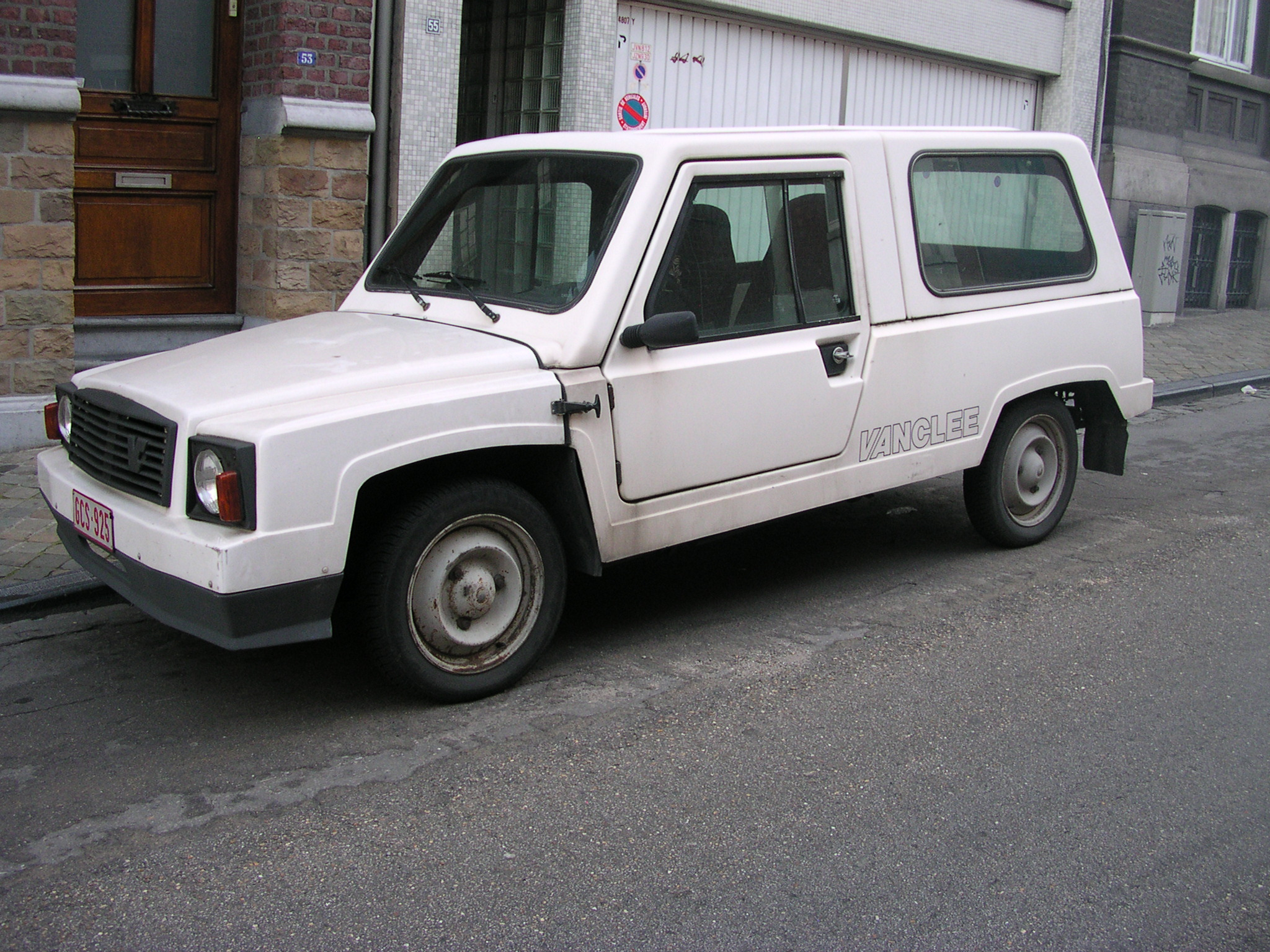
Belgian VanClee Mungo

The VanClee company made a number of fiberglass kit-cars. Their models 'Emmet' and 'Mungo' were based on the Citroën A-series platform and mechanicals, and were clearly inspired by the Méhari.

=== Fiberfab Sherpa ===
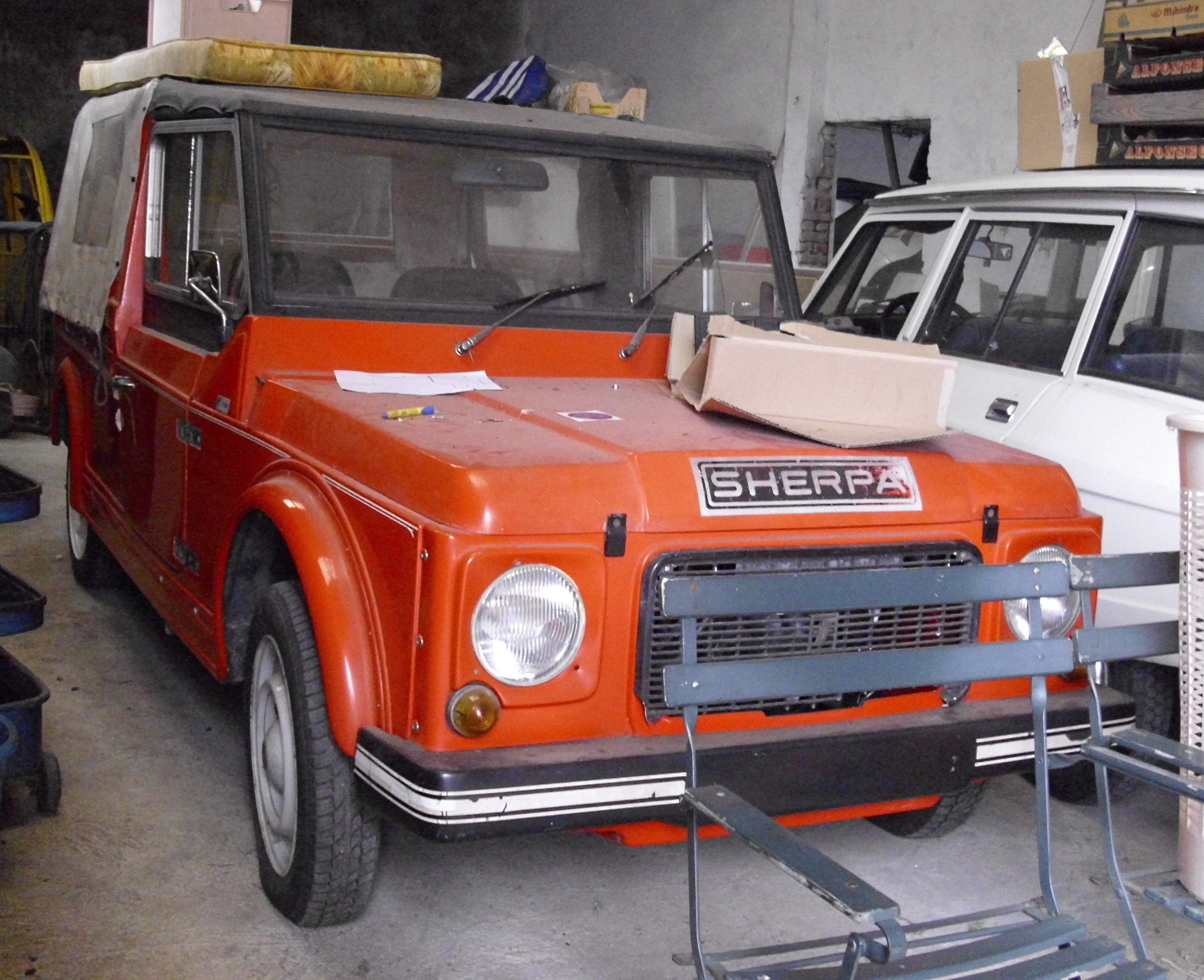
German Fiberfab Sherpa

The Méhari was never type approved for sale in Germany, because the ABS body is flammable at 400 degrees C. In 1975, German fiberglass kit car specialist Fiberfab developed the Sherpa, using Citroën delivered platforms, and sold 250 units.

=== Teilhol ===
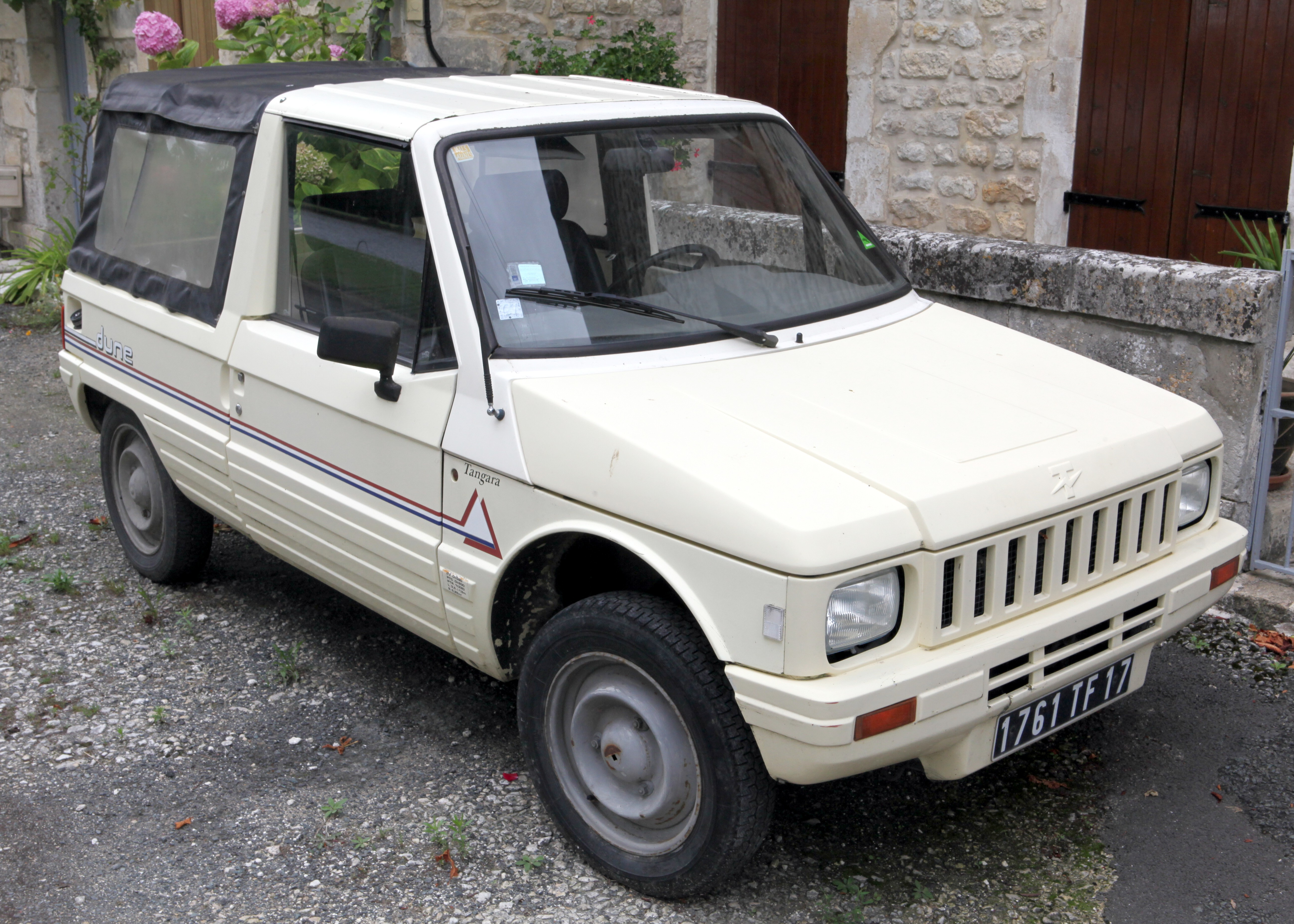

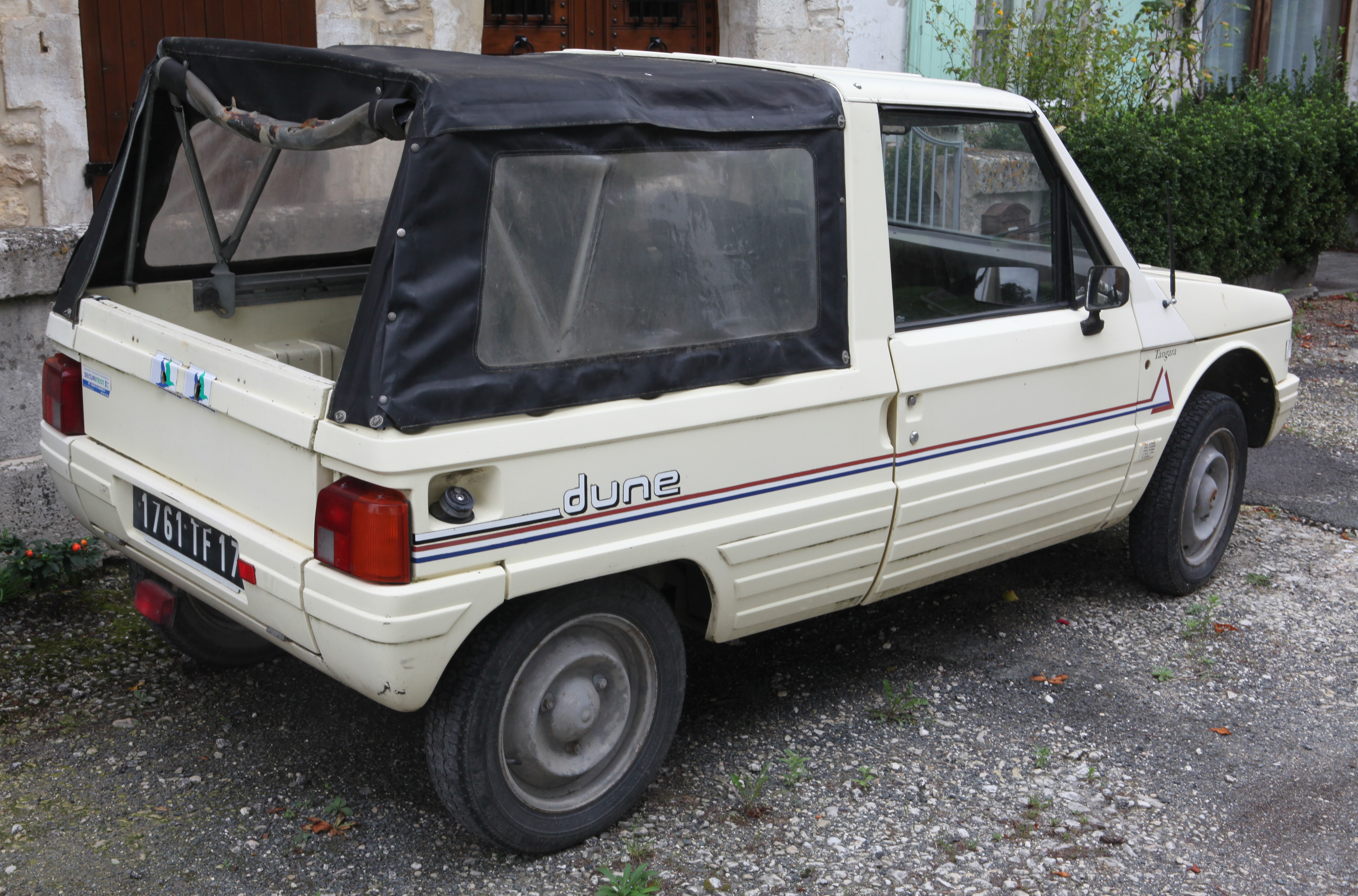
Teilhol Tangara

The Teilhol company, which had been building the recently defunct Renault Rodeo, created the Tangara using 2CV mechanicals, with bolt-on pre-dyed GRP panels. It also created a Citroën AX-based model. The company ceased operations in 1990.

=== Chassis restorations ===
Due to its mechanical simplicity, the Méhari can easily be restored to "as new" condition. All parts including the chassis are easily available, creating an active restoration market.

=== Cassis electric Méhari ===
Méhari Club Cassis, a specialist based in the South of France, has been rebuilding the cars for many years, and as of 2019 sells brand new Méhari cars with an electric powertrain. These qualify for exemption from French new car regulations (for the vintage 1968 design) as long as the car is not driven on the motorway (voitures sans permis).

=== Factory electric Méhari ===
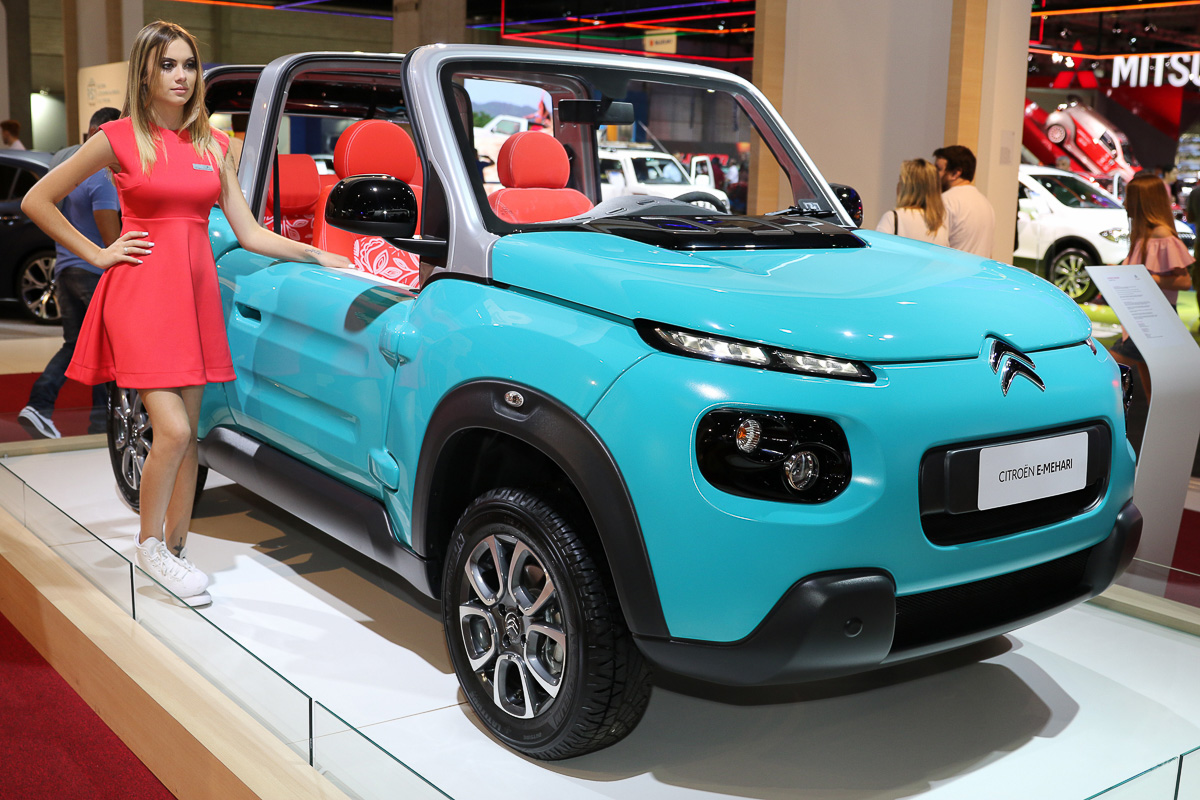
Citroën E-Méhari

The factory began selling a new electric car, the Citroën E-Méhari in 2016.

== Colours ==
The car's colour was integrated into the ABS plastic during production, with limited colour choices. One colour, Vert Montana, remained a choice throughout the car's entire production span. Except for the limited edition Azur, the official names of colours all refer to desert regions.

As ultraviolet sunlight degrades the colourfastness of ABS plastic, unrestored cars have sometimes faded. New bodies for restorations are available in various original colours.

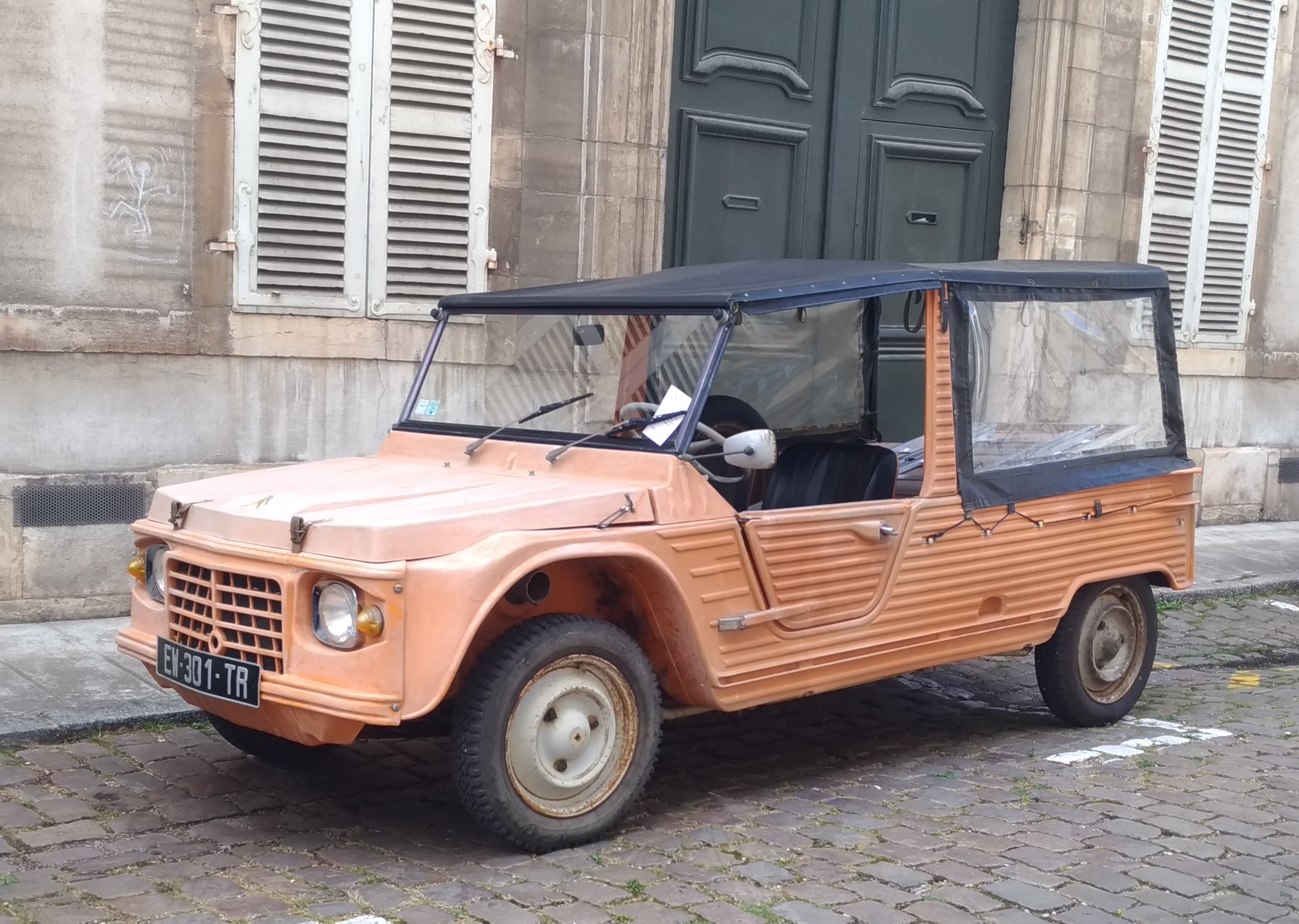
Strongly faded 1972 Méhari

Colour	Years
Rouge Hopi	1968–1975
Vert Montana	1968–1987
Beige Kalahari	1968–1977
Orange Kirghiz	1969–1987
Vert Tibesti	1976–1979
Beige Hoggar	1978–1987
Jaune Atacama	1980–1987
Azur	1983–1987

== Sales figures ==
Year	1968	1969	1970	1971	1972	1973	1974	1975	1976	1977	1978	1979	1980	1981	1982	1983	1984	1985	1986	1987	Total
Méhari	837	12,624	11,246	10,175	11,742	12,567	13,910	8,920	9,569	9,645	8,467	8,995	8,351	4,833	4,137	3,349	2,654	1,882	669	381	144,953

== Criminal activity ==
- In 1973–1974, 63 Citroën Méharis were burned by an arsonist in Paris for unknown reasons.
- In 1985, the Neapolitan journalist Giancarlo Siani was murdered, hit 10 times in the head by two hitmen sent by the Camorra while in his Méhari, green with a black canvas top. Between October and December 2013, Siani's Méhari made a trip from Naples to Brussels, passing through Rome, in order to remember the life of this journalist, like all the other journalists killed by the mafia.

== See also ==
- BMC Mini Moke
- Volkswagen Type 181
- Fiat Ghia Jolly
- Renault Rodeo
- Meyers Manx
