= American Competitiveness Initiative =

Federal assistance program for research and development and education

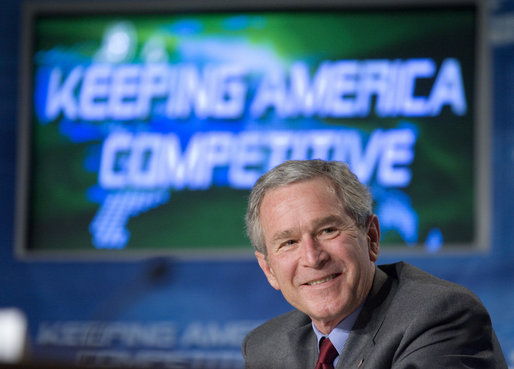
President George W. Bush participates in a Panel on the American Competitiveness Initiative at Cisco Systems, Inc in San Jose, California, Friday, April 21, 2006.

The American Competitiveness Initiative (ACI) was a federal assistance program intended to help America maintain its competitiveness through investment in research and development (R&D) and education. The ACI’s focus was on programs likely to strengthen U.S. competitiveness by targeting funding to agencies that support research in the physical sciences. NASA, however, was not included in the ACI.

In partnership with the private sector, state and local governments, and colleges and universities, the ACI hoped to promote new levels of educational achievement and economic productivity.

== Background ==
In October 2005, the National Academies of Science released a report that revealed how U.S. technological leadership and export were under threat. As an example, the report cited that out of the 120 chemical plants built around the world worth $1 billion or more, one was constructed in the United States but 50 were in China. The organization stressed that "the scientific and technical building blocks of our economic leadership are eroding at a time when many other nations are gathering strength." Three months after the publication of the report, ACI was announced in President George W. Bush’s State of the Union Address given on January 31, 2006. In his statement, the President said: "Our greatest advantage in the world has always been our educated, hard-working, ambitious people - and we are going to keep that edge."

The Initiative committed $5.9 billion ($1.3 billion in new Federal funding, and an additional $4.6 billion in R&D tax incentives) in FY 2007 to increase investments in R&D, strengthen education, and encourage entrepreneurship. Over ten years, the Initiative planned to commit $50 billion to increase funding for research and $86 billion for R&D tax incentives. Key programs under the ACI included:

- more rigorous math courses with new programs for elementary and middle school students and research-based instruction;
- in-service development of new Advanced Placement and International Baccalaureate teachers in schools that serve low-income families; and
- preservice development for 30,000 math and science professionals who will become adjunct high school teachers.

The ACI was signed into law in 2007 and has since been replaced by the America COMPETES Act. The cutoff date for grants appropriated and funded by this bill was December 31, 2008.
