= Renault =

French multinational automobile manufacturer

Coordinates: 48.8315°N 2.2283°E

Renault S.A.

- Headquarters in Paris, France
- Trade name: Renault Group
- Formerly: Société Renault Frères (1899–1944); Régie Nationale des Usines Renault (1944–1990)
- Type: Public
- Traded as: Euronext Paris: RNO; CAC 40 component
- ISIN: FR0000131906
- Industry: Automotive
- Founded: 25 February 1899; 127 years ago
- Founders: Louis Renault; Marcel Renault; Fernand Renault
- Headquarters: Boulogne-Billancourt, Île-de-France, France
- Area served: Worldwide; 128 countries
- Key people: Jean-Dominique Senard (chairman); François Provost (CEO)
- Products: Automobiles; Commercial vehicles
- Production output: ▲2,264,815 (2024, sales)
- Brands: Renault; Alpine; Dacia; Mobilize
- Revenue: ▲€57.92 billion (2025)
- Operating income: ▼€−7.87 billion (2025)
- Net income: ▼€−10.93 billion (2025)
- Total assets: ▼€121.01 billion (2025)
- Total equity: ▼€22.30 billion (2025)
- Owners: French state (15.01%); Nissan Motor Corporation (15%)
- Number of employees: ▼100,541 (2025)
- Subsidiaries: List: Transportation; Renault SAS; Société des Automobiles Alpine SAS; S.C. Automobile Dacia S.A. (99.43%); Renault Korea (52.9%); JMEV (50%); Horse Powertrain (50%); Financing; RCI Banque; Retail; Renault Retail Group; Other; Motrio; International; Oyak-Renault; Renault Pars; Renault Argentina; Renault España; Renault Geely do Brasil (50%); Renault India; Renault Mexico; Renault Maroc; Revoz; Hyvia (50%); Sofasa; Somaca
- Website: www.renaultgroup.com/en

Renault
- Current owner: Renault S.A.
- Country: France
- Introduced: December 1898
- Website: www.renaultgroup.com/en/our-brands/renault/

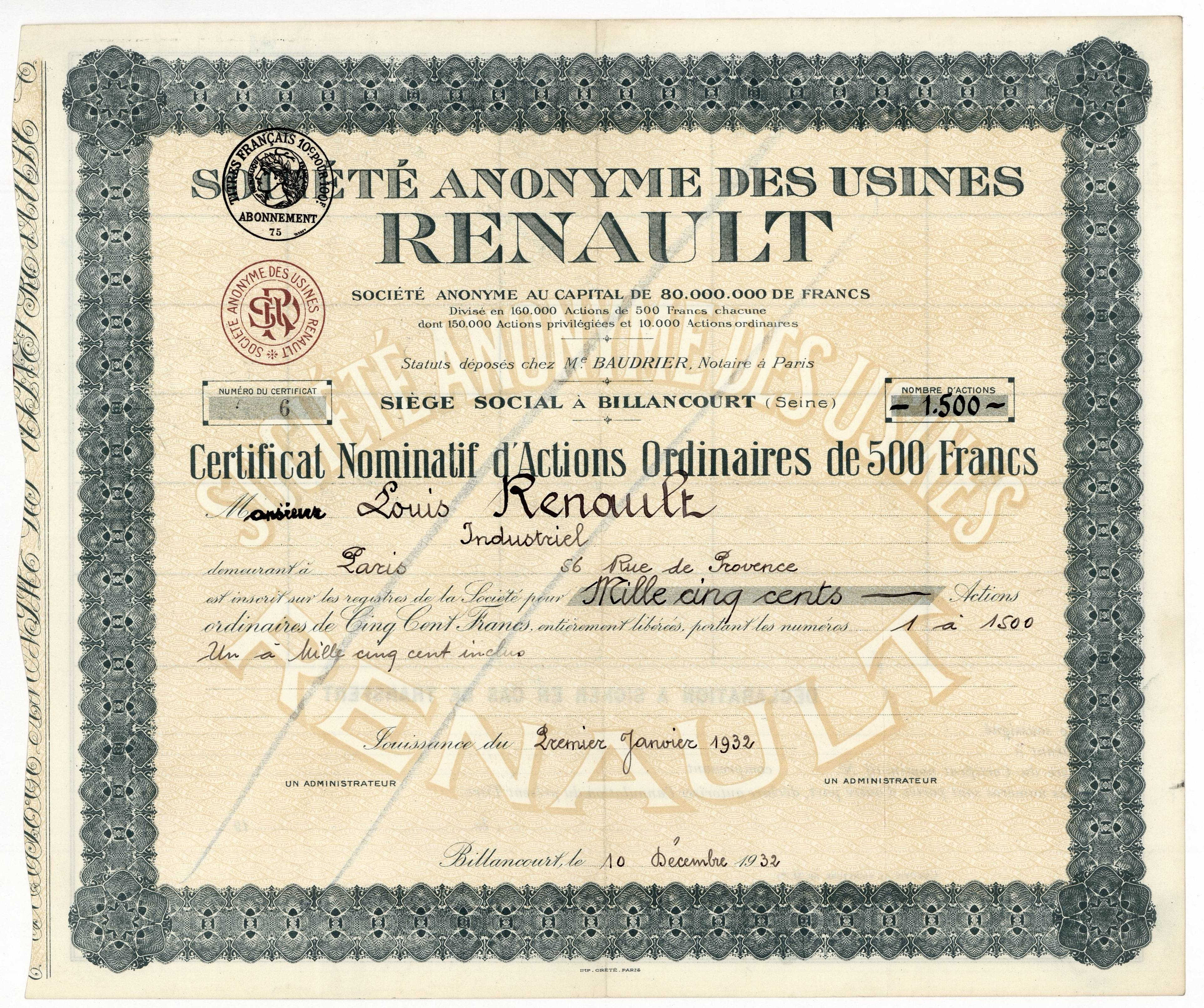
Share of the SA des Usines Renault, issued 1 January 1932 to Louis Renault

Renault S.A., commonly referred to as Groupe Renault (UK: /ˈrɛnoʊ/ REN-oh, US: /rəˈnoʊ/ rə-NOH; French: [ʁəno], also known as the Renault Group in English), is a French multinational corporation and automobile manufacturer established in 1899. The company produces a range of cars and vans; it has previously manufactured trucks, tractors, tanks, buses/coaches, aircraft and aircraft engines, as well as autorail vehicles.

Headquartered in Boulogne-Billancourt, a suburb of Paris, the Renault group is made up of the namesake Renault marque along with subsidiaries Alpine, Dacia from Romania, and Mobilize. It has been part of the Renault–Nissan–Mitsubishi Alliance (previously Renault–Nissan Alliance) since 1999. The French state and Nissan of Japan each own a 15% share of the company.

Renault also has other subsidiaries such as RCI Banque (automotive financing), Renault Retail Group (automotive distribution), and Motrio (automotive parts). Renault has various joint ventures, including Horse Powertrain (engine development), Oyak-Renault (Turkish manufacturing), Renault Nissan Automotive India (Indian manufacturing), and Renault Korea (previously Renault Samsung Motors, South Korean manufacturing). Renault Trucks, previously known as Renault Véhicules Industriels, has been part of the Volvo Group since 2001. Renault Agriculture became fully owned by German agricultural equipment manufacturer CLAAS in 2008.

Renault is known for its role in motor sport, particularly rallying, Formula One and Formula E. The company's early work on mathematical curve modeling for car bodies is significant in the history of computer graphics.

== History ==
=== Founding and early years (1898–1918) ===
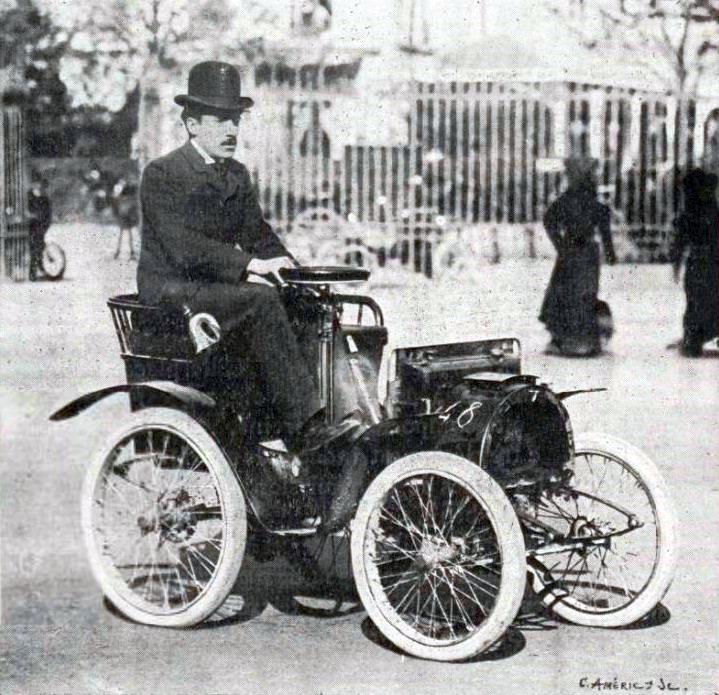
Louis Renault (1877–1944) in 1903

The Renault corporation was founded on 25 February 1899 as Société Renault Frères by Louis Renault and his brothers Marcel and Fernand. Louis was a bright, aspiring young engineer who had already designed and built several prototypes before teaming up with his brothers, who had honed their business skills working for their father's textile firm. While Louis handled design and production, Marcel and Fernand managed the business.

The first Renault car, the Renault Voiturette 1CV, was sold to a friend of Louis' father after giving him a test ride on 24 December 1898.

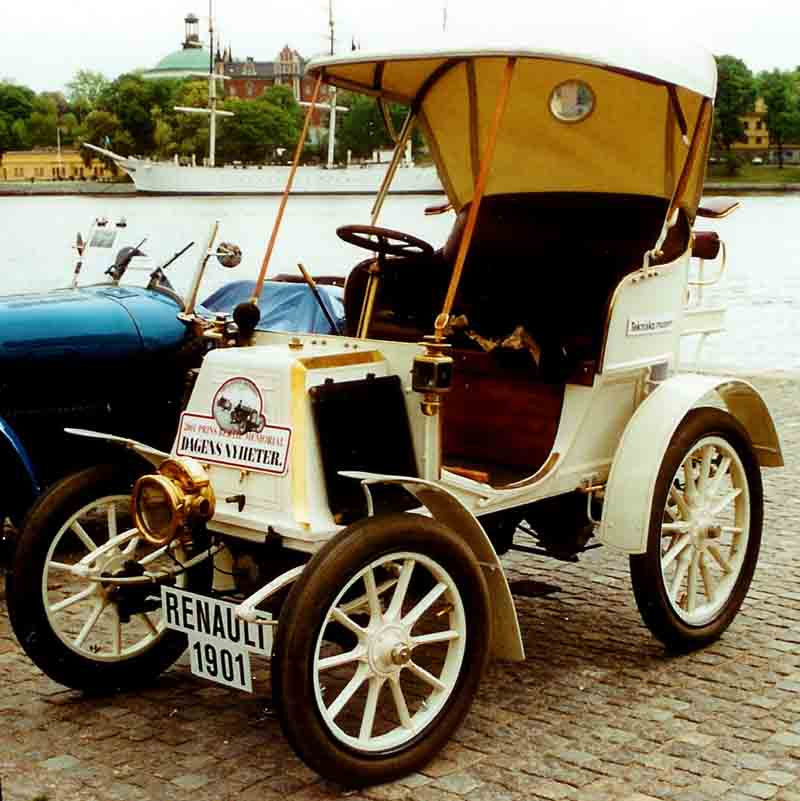
1901 Voiturette Renault Type D Série B

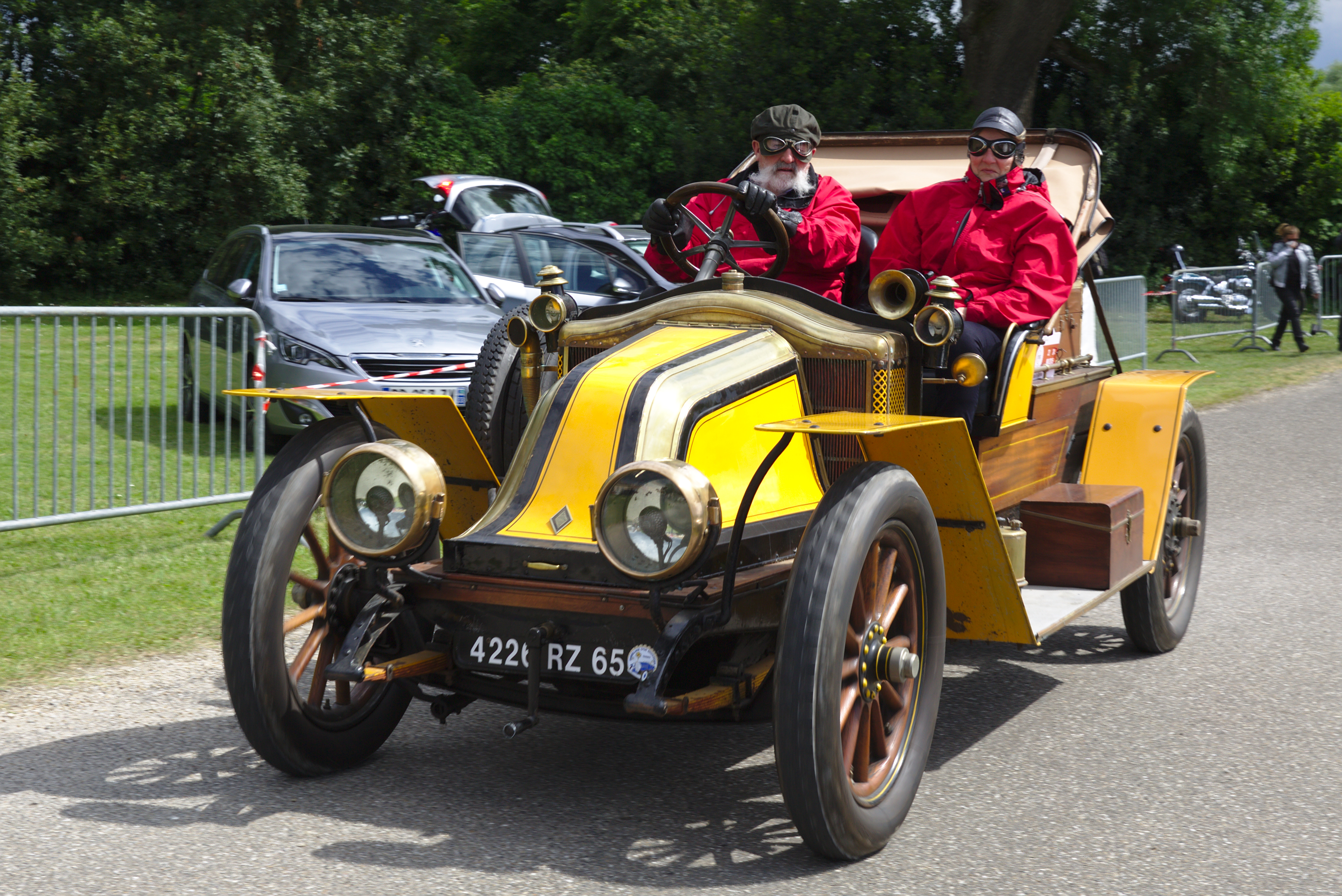
1911 Renault CC

In 1903, Renault began to manufacture its own engines; until then it had purchased them from De Dion-Bouton. The first major volume sale came in 1905 when Société des Automobiles de Place bought Renault AG1 cars to establish a fleet of taxis. These vehicles were later used by the French military to transport troops during World War I which earned them the nickname "Taxi de la Marne." By 1907, a significant percentage of London and Paris taxis had been built by Renault. Renault was also the best-selling foreign brand in New York in 1907 and 1908. In 1908 the company produced 3,575 units, becoming the country's largest car manufacturer.

The brothers recognised the value of publicity that participation in motor racing could generate for their vehicles. Renault made itself known through succeeding in the first city-to-city races held in Switzerland, producing rapid sales growth. Both Louis and Marcel raced company vehicles, but Marcel was killed in an accident during the 1903 Paris-Madrid race. Although Louis never raced again, his company remained very involved, including Ferenc Szisz winning the first Grand Prix motor racing event in a Renault AK 90CV in 1906.

Louis took full control of the company as the only remaining brother in 1906 when Fernand retired for health reasons. Fernand died in 1909 and Louis became the sole owner, renaming the company Société des Automobiles Renault (Renault Automobile Company).

Renault fostered its reputation for innovation from very early on. At the time, cars were luxury items manufactured without assembly line advances. The price of the smallest Renaults at the time was 3000 francs (₣); an amount equal to ten years pay for the average worker. In 1905, the company introduced mass production techniques and Taylorism in 1913. In 1911, Renault visited Henry Ford at the Highland Park factory and adopted some of the manufacturing principles from his trip.

Renault manufactured buses and commercial cargo vehicles in the pre-war years. The first real commercial truck from the company was introduced in 1906. Renault were also an important pre-war manufacturer of aircraft engines. The firm entered the business in 1907 with the first of what would become a series of air-cooled V8 engines. In 1911 the Renault 90 hp became the world's first V12 aircraft engine when it was exhibited at the Salon de l’Aéronautique at the Grand Palais in Paris.

During World War I, the company branched out into ammunition and military vehicles such as the revolutionary Renault FT tank. Production of aero engines also ramped up with additional licensed production of the firms' products being undertaken by various companies, including Rolls-Royce who got their start in the aircraft engine business producing a batch of Renault 70 hp air-cooled V8s. Renault's most successful aircraft engine was the 300 hp 12Fe with around 5,300 built during the war. The company's military designs were so successful that Louis was awarded the Legion of Honour for his company's contributions. The company exported engines to American automobile manufacturers for use in such automobiles as the GJG, which used a Renault 26 horsepower (19 kW) or 40 hp (30 kW) four-cylinder engine.

=== Interwar years (1919–1938) ===
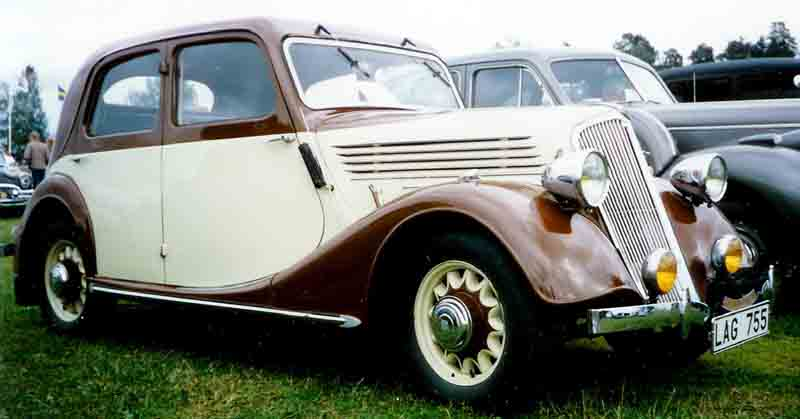
Renault Celtaquatre, 1935

Louis Renault enlarged Renault's scope after 1918, producing agricultural and industrial machinery. The war from 1914 until 1918 led to many new products. The first Renault tractor, the Type GP was produced between 1919 and 1930. It was based on the FT tank. Renault struggled to compete with the increasingly popular small, affordable "people's cars," while problems with the United States stock market and the workforce slowed the company's growth. Renault also had to find a way to distribute its vehicles more efficiently. In 1920, Louis signed one of its first distribution contracts with Gustave Gueudet, an entrepreneur from Amiens, France.

The pre-First World War cars had a distinctive front shape caused by positioning the radiator behind the engine to give a so-called "coal scuttle" bonnet. This continued through the 1920s. Only in 1930 did all models place the radiator at the front. The bonnet badge changed from circular to the familiar and continuing diamond shape in 1925. The practice of installing the radiator behind the engine against the firewall continued during the 1950s and 1960s on vehicles where the engine was installed longitudinally in the rear of the vehicle.

Renault introduced new models at the Paris Motor Show, which was held in September or October of the year. This led to confusion about model years. For example, a "1927" model was mostly produced in 1928.

Renault cars during this time period had two model lines; the economy four-cylinder engine models that in the 1930s had the suffix "Quatre" and the luxury six-cylinder models that were sold with the suffix "-six", later becoming "Stella." For example, in 1928, when Renault produced 45,809 cars, its seven models started with a 6CV, a 10CV, the Monasix, 15CV, the Vivasix, the 18/22CV and the 40CV. Renault offered eight body styles. The longer rolling chassis were available to coachbuilders. The smaller were the most popular while the least produced was the 18/24CV. The most expensive body style in each range was the closed car. Roadsters and tourers (torpedoes) were the cheapest.

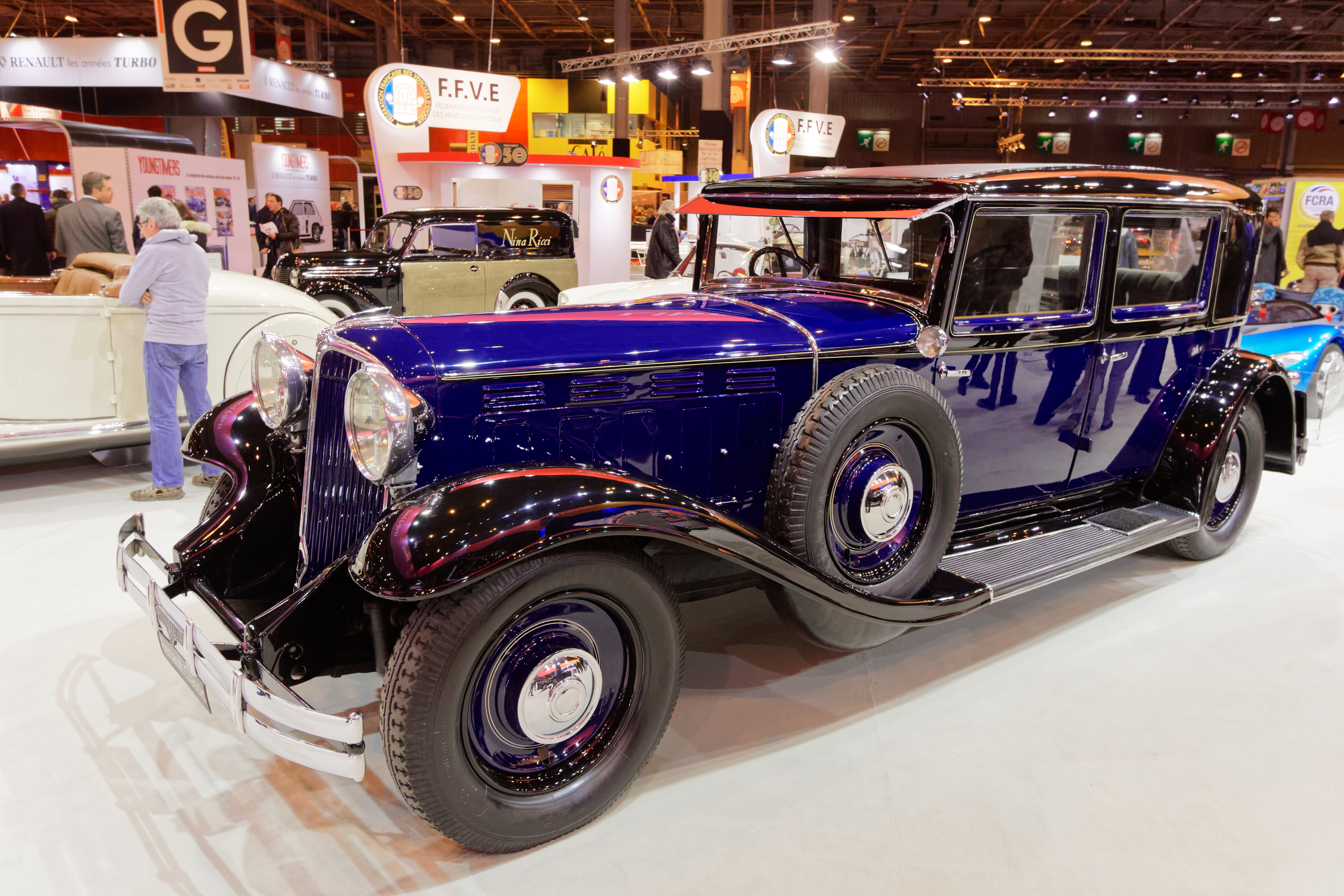
1932 Renault Reinastella

The London operation was important to Renault in 1928. The UK market was quite large and North America also received exports for the luxury car market. Lifted suspensions, enhanced cooling, and special bodies were common on vehicles sold abroad. Exports to the US by 1928 had declined to near-zero from their high point prior to WWI. A Type NM 40CV Tourer had a US list price of over US$4,600 ($86,250 in 2025 dollars), about the same as a Cadillac V-12, Packard Eight, Fiat 520, or Delahaye. Closed 7-seat limousines like the Renault Suprastella started at US$6,000 ($112,500 in 2025 dollars).

Cars were conservatively engineered and built. The Renault Vivasix, model PG1, was sold as the "executive sports" model beginning in 1927. Lighter weight factory steel bodies powered by a 3,180 cubic centimetre (cc) six-cylinder motor provided a formula that lasted until the Second World War.

"de Grand Luxe Renaults", those with a wheelbase over 12-foot (3.7 m), were produced in small numbers in two major types – six- and eight-cylinder. The 1927 six-cylinder Grand Renault models NM, PI and PZ introduced the new three spring rear suspension that considerably aided stability that was needed since some vehicles surpassed 90 mph (140 km/h).

The straight 8-cylinder Reinastella was introduced in 1929 and expanded to a range culminating in 1939 Suprastella. Coachbuilders included Kellner, Labourdette, J. Rothschild et Fils and Renault bodies. Closed car Renault bodies were often trimmed with interior woodwork by Rothschild.

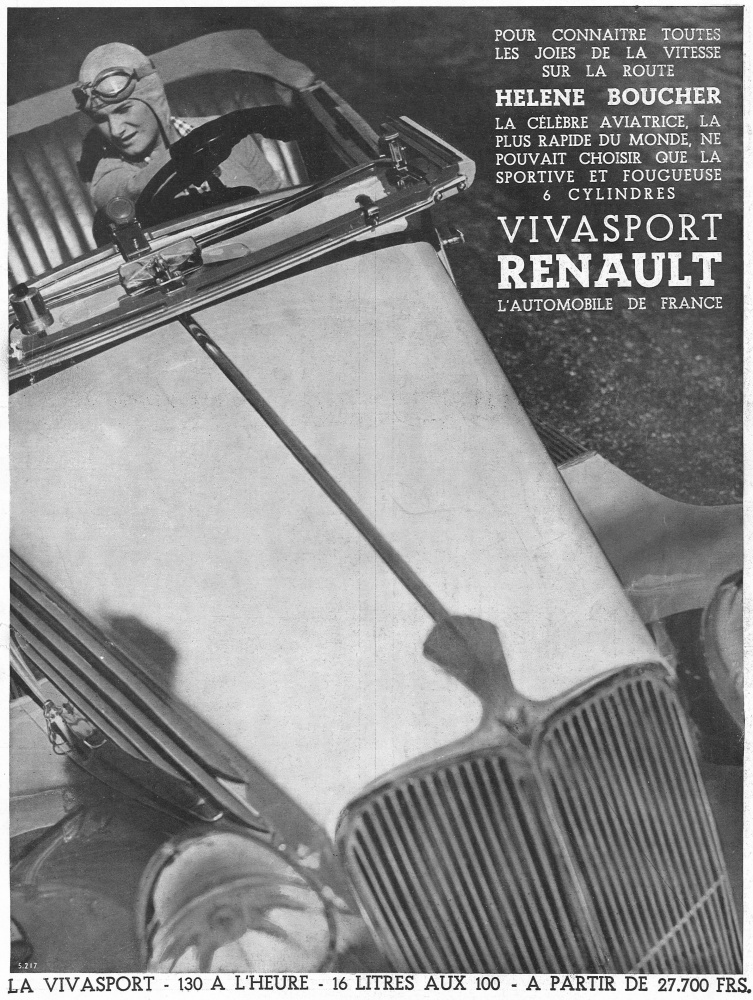
Renault Viva Grand Sport and Hélène Boucher. During the 1930s, Renault settled several speed world records with Caudron planes, thanks to its 6-cylinders engines and aerodynamic designs.

In 1928, Renault introduced an upgraded specification to its "Stella" line. The Vivastella's and Grand Renaults had upgraded interior fittings and a small star fitted above the front hood logo. This proved to be a winning differentiator and in the 1930s all cars changed to the Stella suffix from the previous two alpha character model identifiers.

The Grand Renaults were built using a considerable amount of aluminium. Engines, brakes, transmissions, floor and running boards and all external body panels were aluminium. Of the few that were built, many went to scrap to aid the war effort.

In 1931, Renault introduced diesel engines for its commercial vehicles.

Renault was one of the few French vehicle manufacturers that pursued the production of aircraft engines after World War I. In the late 1920s, it attempted to produce a high-power military engine to compete with the American Pratt & Whitney units, which proved unsuccessful, although its civil engines achieved better results. In the 1930s, the company took over the aircraft manufacturer Caudron, focusing its production in small airplanes, acquired a stake in Air France and partnered to establish the airmail company Air Bleu. Renault Caudron airplanes settled several speed world records during the 1930s. Renault continued developing tanks as part of France's rearming effort, including the D1 and the FT's replacement, the R 35.

During the late 1920s and early 1930s, Renault was surpassed by Citroën as the largest car manufacturer in France. Citroën models at the time were more innovative and popular than Renault's. However, by mid-1930s the French manufacturers were hit by the Great Depression. Renault could initially offset losses through its tractor, railroad and weaponry businesses, while Citroën filed for bankruptcy, and was later acquired by Michelin. Renault became again the largest car manufacturer, a position it would keep until the 1980s.

Renault was finally affected by the Great Depression economic crisis in 1936. The company spun off Caudron and its foundry and aircraft engine divisions into related but autonomous operations, keeping its core automotive business. Between 1936 and 1938, a series of labour disputes, strikes, and worker unrest spread throughout the French automobile industry. The disputes were eventually quashed by Renault in a particularly intransigent way, and over 2,000 people lost their jobs.

=== World War II and aftermath (1939–1944) ===
After the French capitulation in 1940, Louis Renault refused to produce tanks for Nazi Germany, which took control of his factories. As Renault was manufacturing the Renault UE tank for the Allies, he produced trucks instead. On 3 March 1942, the British Royal Air Force (RAF) launched 235 low-level bombers at the Île Seguin, Billancourt, Paris plant, the largest number aimed at a single target during the war. 460 metric tons (450 long tons; 510 short tons) of bombs were dropped on the plant and the surrounding area, causing extensive damage along with heavy civilian casualties. Renault resolved to rebuild the factory as quickly as possible, but bombardments continued a year later, on 4 April, this time delivered by the Americans, and on 3 and 15 September 1943.

A few weeks after the Liberation of Paris, at the start of September 1944, the factory gates at Renault's Billancourt plant reopened. Operations restarted slowly, in an atmosphere poisoned by plotting and political conspiracy. In 1936, the Billancourt factory had been the scene of violent political and industrial unrest that had surfaced under Léon Blum's Popular Front government. The political jostling and violence that followed liberation ostensibly reflected the rivalries between capitalist collaboration and communist resistance; many of the scores settled predated the invasion.

Responding to the chaotic situation at Renault, a 27 September 1944 meeting of the Council of Ministers (fr) took place under de Gaulle's presidency. Postwar European politics had quickly become polarised between communists and anti-communists, and in France de Gaulle was keen to resist Communist Party attempts to monopolise the political dividends available to resistance heroes: politically Billancourt was a communist stronghold. The government decided to "requisition" the Renault factories. A week later, on 4 October, Pierre Lefaucheux, a resistance leader with a background in engineering and top-level management, was appointed provisional administrator of the firm, assuming his responsibilities at once.

Meanwhile, provisional government accused Louis Renault of collaborating with the Germans. In the frenzied atmosphere of those early post-liberation days, with many wild accusations, Renault was advised by his lawyers to present himself to a judge. He appeared before Judge Marcel Martin, on 22 September 1944 and was arrested on 23 September 1944, as were several other French automobile-industry leaders. Renault's harsh handling of the 1936–1938 strikes had left him without political allies and no one came to his aid. He was incarcerated at Fresnes prison where he died on 24 October 1944 under unclear circumstances, while awaiting trial.

On 1 January 1945, by de Gaulle's decree, the company was posthumously expropriated from Louis Renault. On 16 January 1945, it was formally nationalised as Régie Nationale des Usines Renault. Renault's were the only factories permanently expropriated by the French government. In subsequent years, the Renault family tried to have the nationalisation rescinded by French courts and receive compensation. In 1945, and again in 1961, the Courts responded that they had no authority to review the government's actions.

=== Postwar resurgence (1945–1971) ===
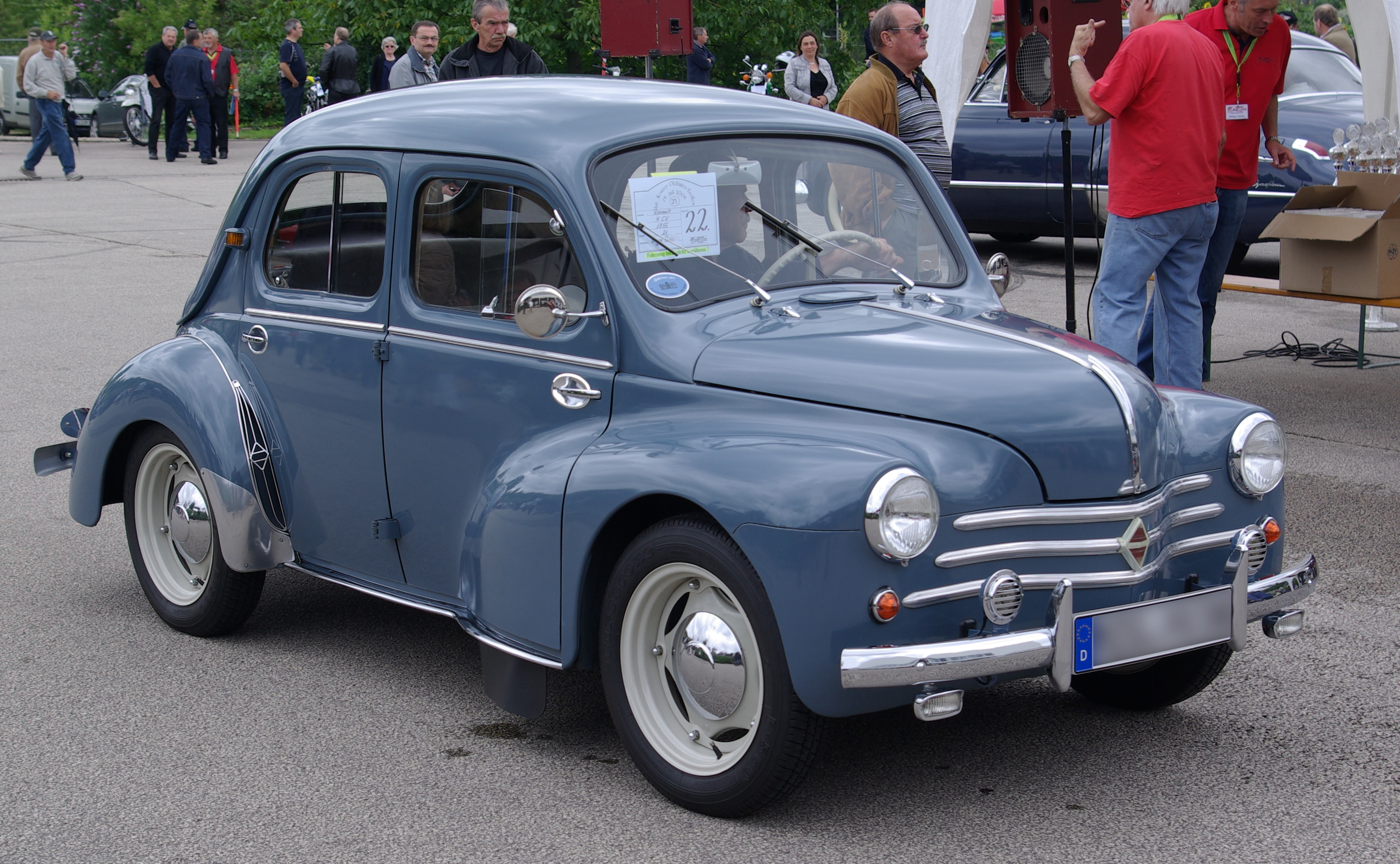
Renault 4CV

Under the leadership of Pierre Lefaucheux, Renault experienced both a commercial resurgence and labor unrest, that was to continue into the 1980s.

In the early 1950s, Renault assembled at least two Frégate variants in England, the "Standard Saloon" and the "De Luxe Saloon".

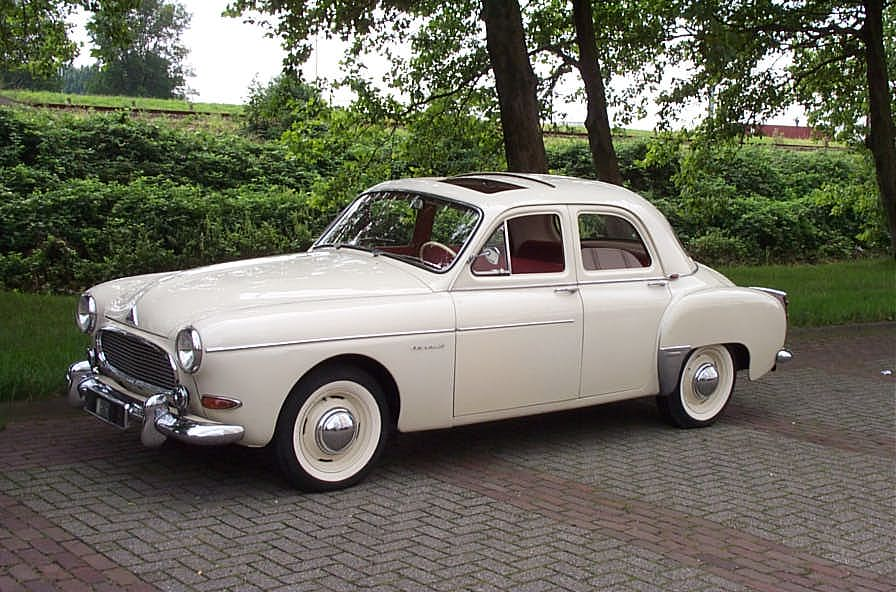
Renault Frégate, 1951

In secrecy during the war, Louis Renault had developed the rear engine 4CV which was subsequently launched under Lefacheux in 1946. Renault debuted its flagship model, the largely conventional 2-litre 4-cylinder Renault Frégate (1951–1960), shortly thereafter. The 4CV proved a capable rival for cars such as the Morris Minor and Volkswagen Beetle; its sales of more than half a million ensured its production until 1961.

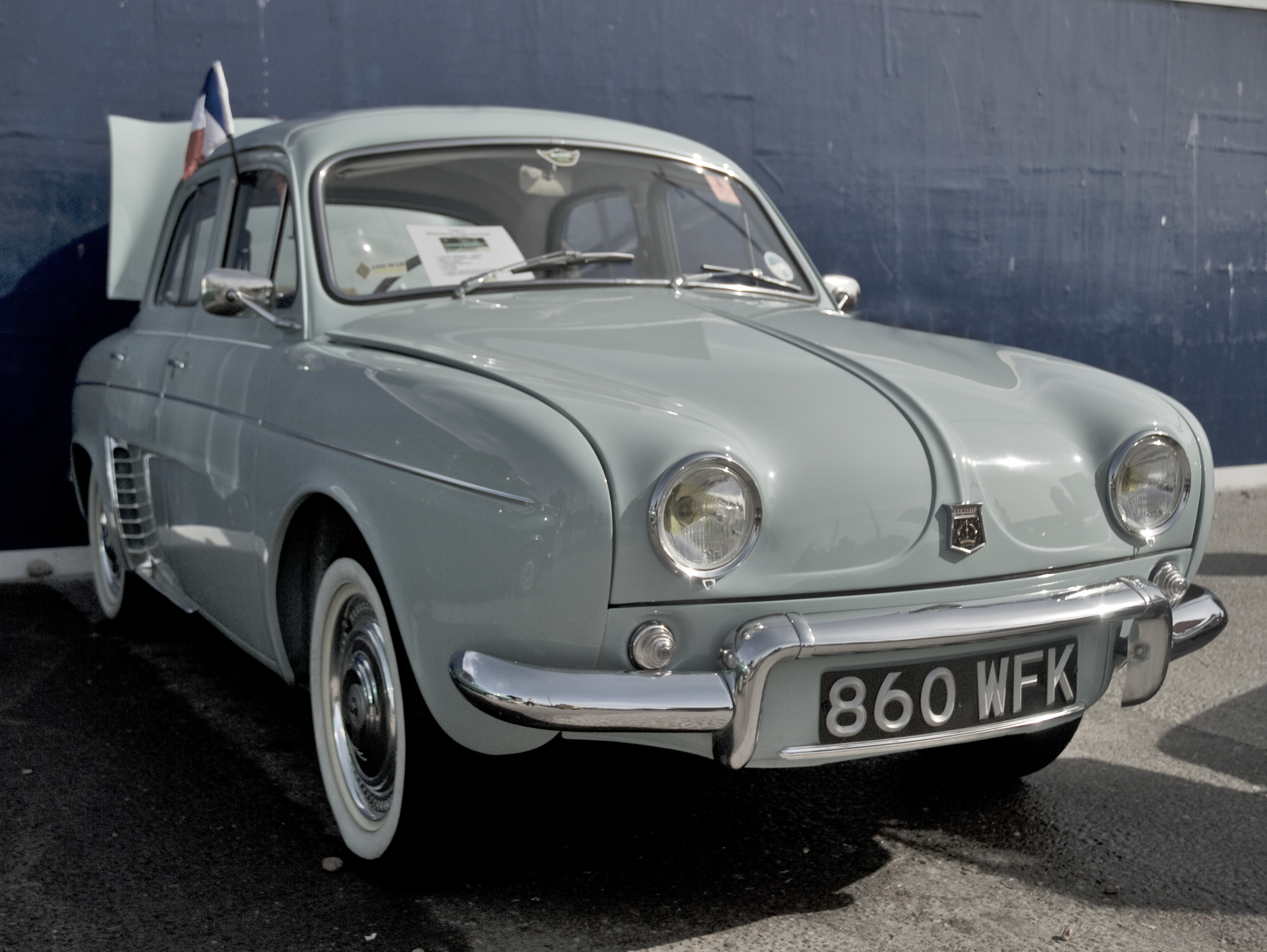
Renault Dauphine

After the success of the 4CV, Lefacheux continued to defy the postwar French Ministry of Industrial Production, which had wanted to convert Renault solely to truck manufacture, by directing the development of its successor. He oversaw the prototyping of the Dauphine (until his death), enlisting the help of artist Paule Marrot in pioneering the company's textile and color division.

The Dauphine sold well as the company expanded production and sales further abroad, including Africa and North America. The Dauphine sold well initially in the US, although it subsequently became outdated against increased competition, including from the country's nascent domestic compacts such as the Chevrolet Corvair. Renault also sold the Renault Caravelle roadster, which was called the Floride outside North America.

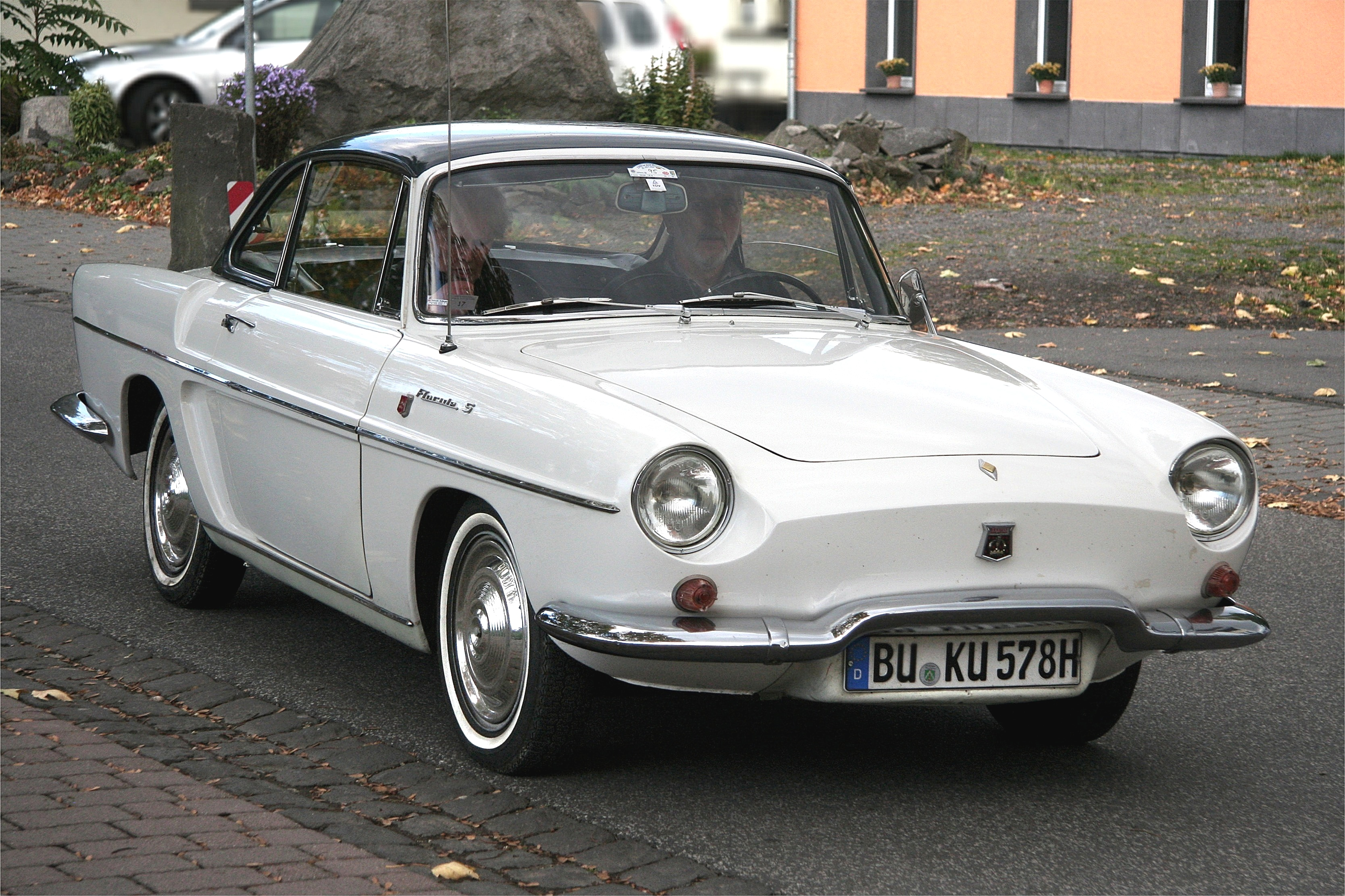
Renault Floride, 1958

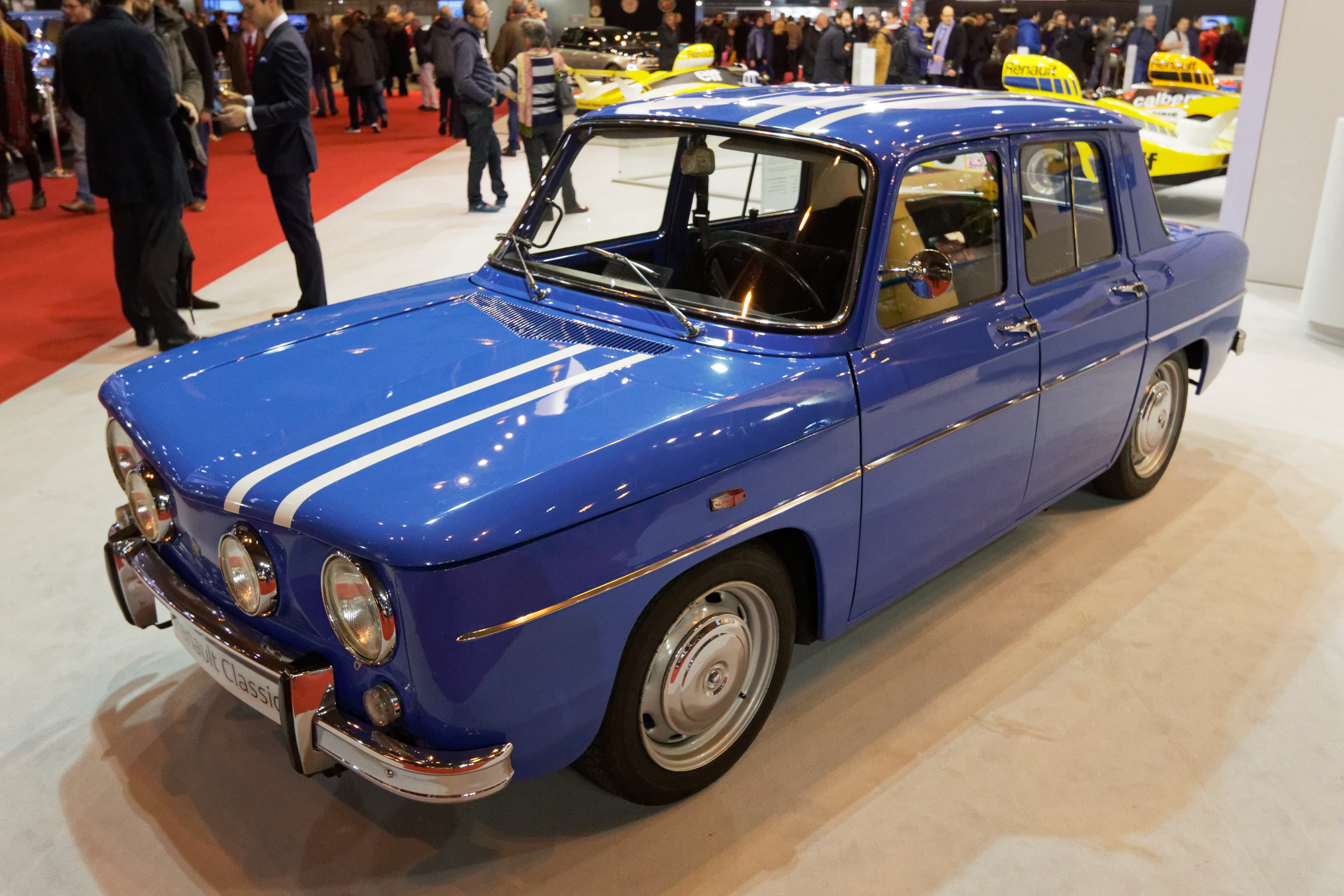
Launched in 1964, the Renault R8 Gordini was the first sportive compact car for a public consumption price.

During the 1950s, Renault absorbed two small French heavy vehicle manufacturers (Somua and Latil) and in 1955 merged them with its own truck and bus division to form the Société Anonyme de Véhicules Industriels et d'Equipements Mécaniques (Saviem).

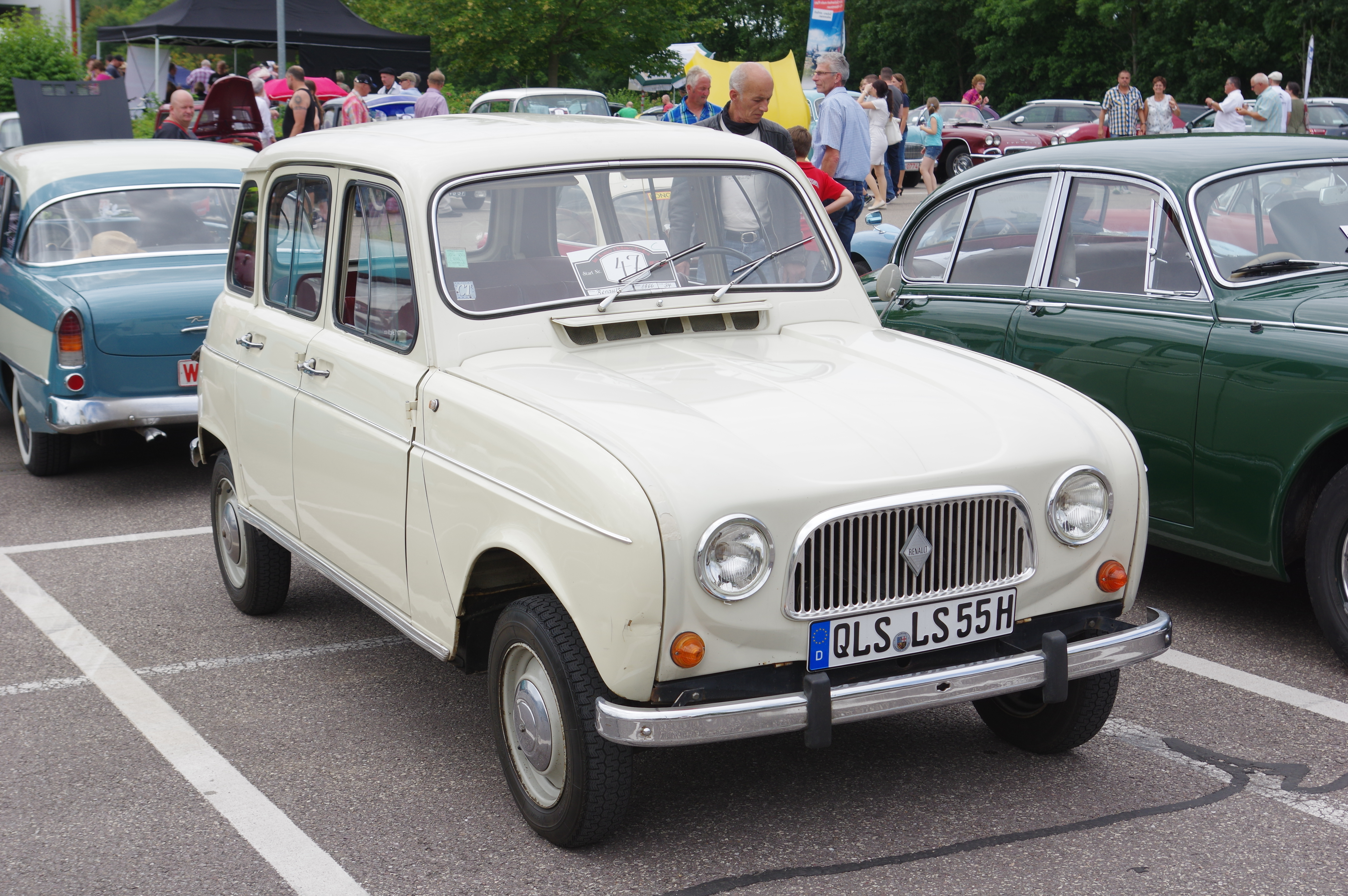
1966 Renault 4

Renault then launched two successful cars – the Renault 4 (1961–1992), a practical competitor for the likes of the Citroën 2CV, and the rear-engined Renault 8. The larger Renault 10 followed the success of the Renault 8, and was the last rear-engined Renault. The company achieved success with the more modern and more upmarket Renault 16, a pioneering hatchback launched in 1966, followed by the smaller Renault 6.

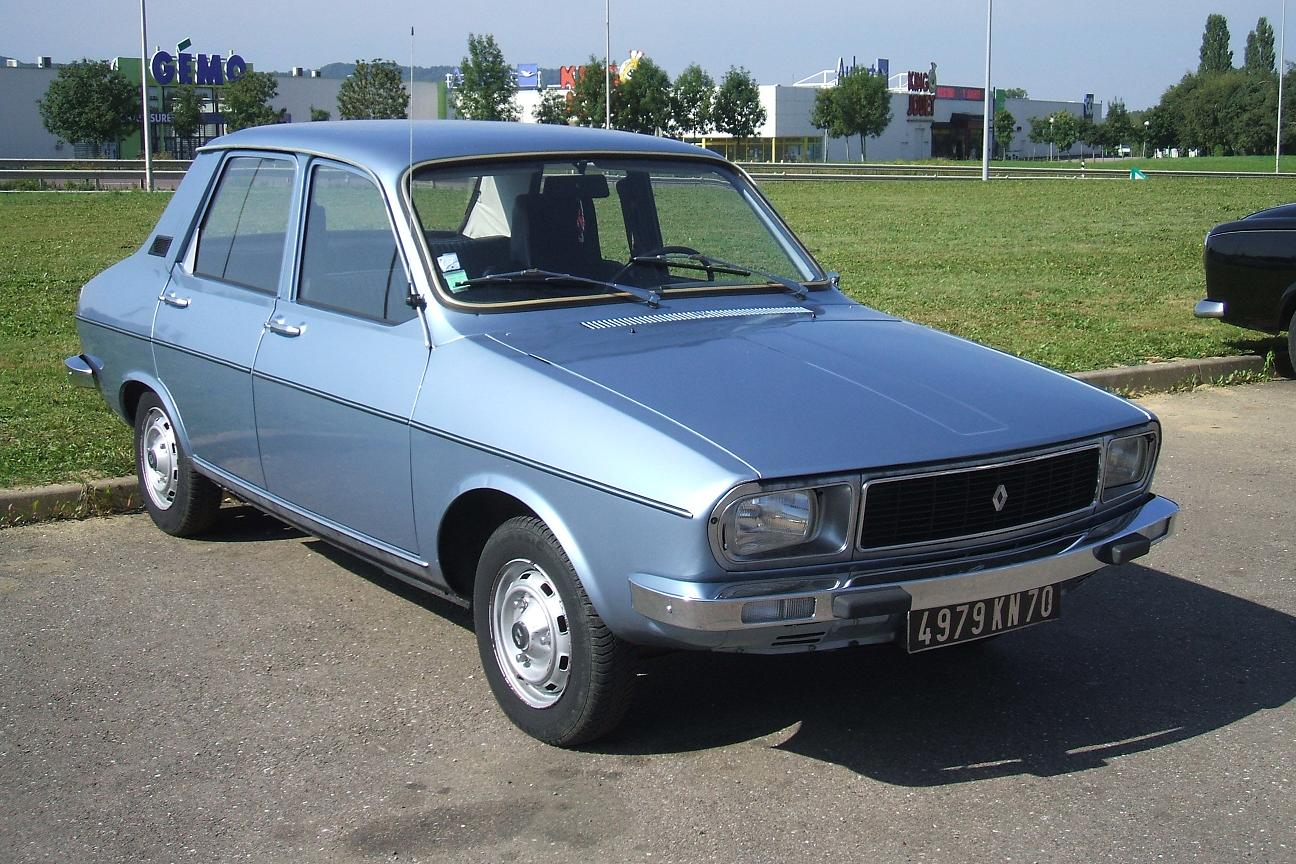
1969 Renault 12

On 16 January 1970, the manufacturer celebrated the 25th anniversary of its 1945 rebirth as the nationalised Régie Nationale des Usines Renault. The 1960s had been a decade of aggressive growth: a few months earlier, in October 1969, the manufacturer had launched the Renault 12, combining the engineering philosophy of its hatchbacks with the more conservative "three-box" design. The four-door Renault 12 model slotted between the Renault 6 and Renault 16. The model was a success. 1970 was also the first year during which Renault produced more than a million cars in a single year, building 1,055,803.

=== Modern era (1972–1980) ===
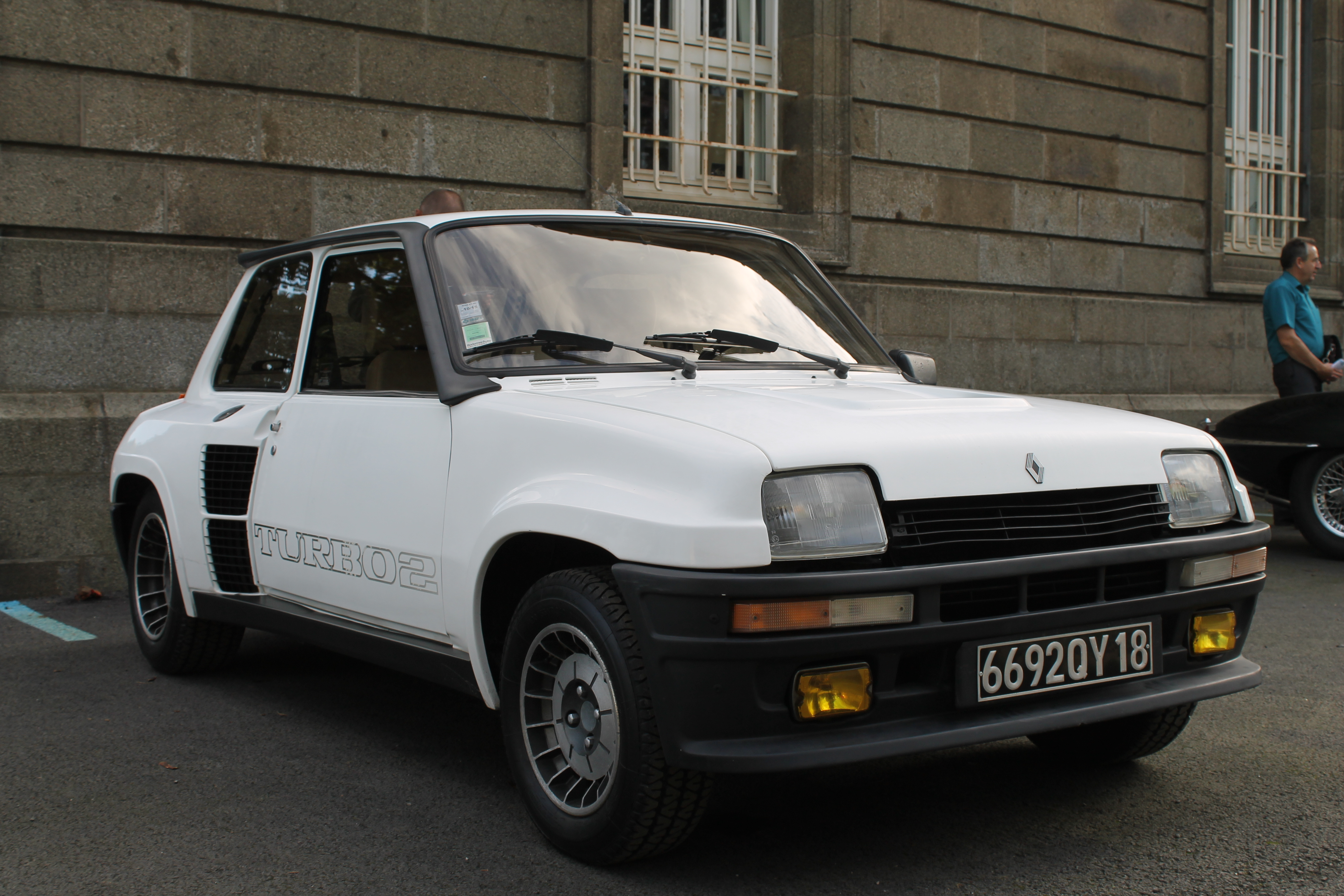
Renault 5 Turbo

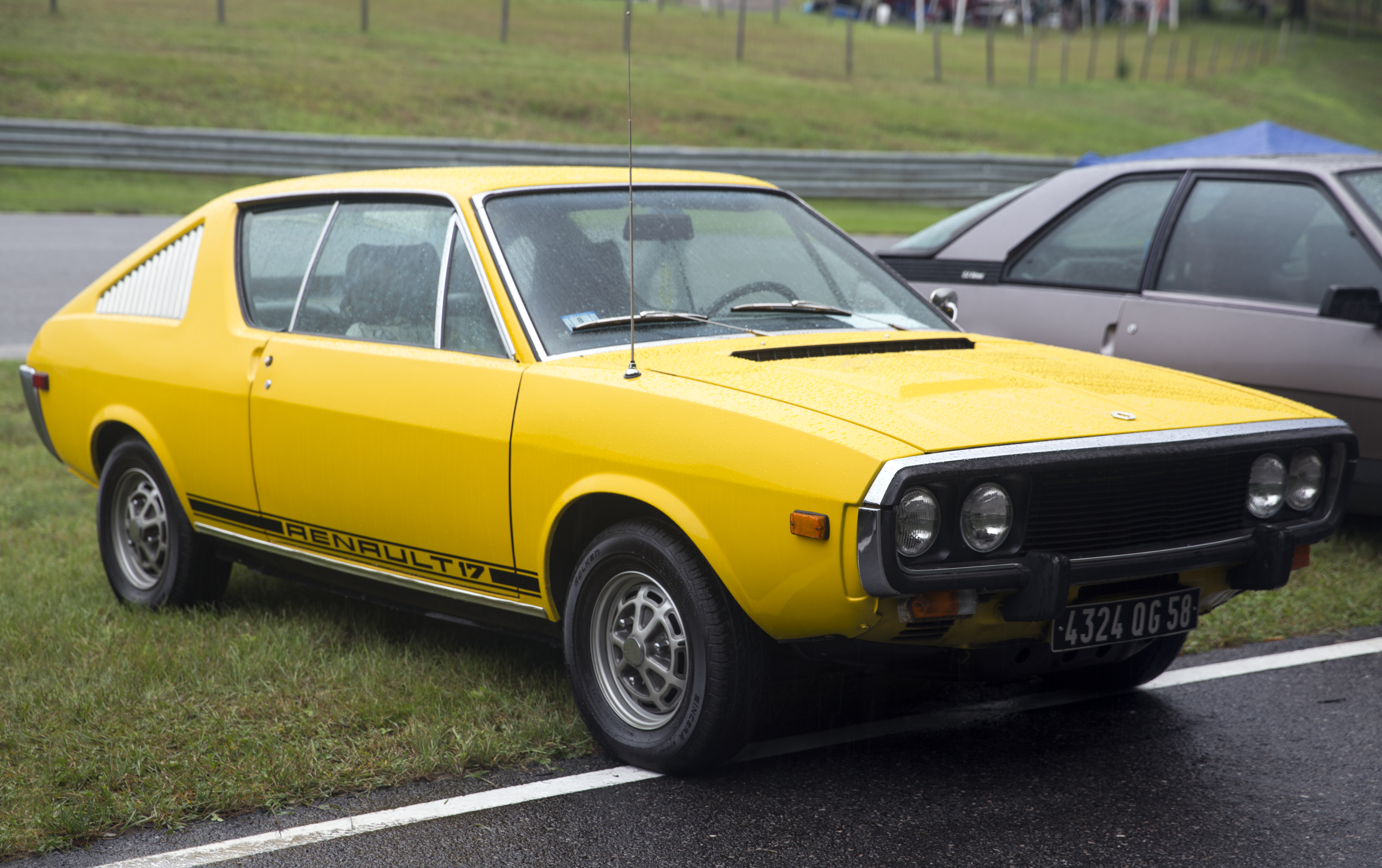
1972 Renault 17 TS coupe

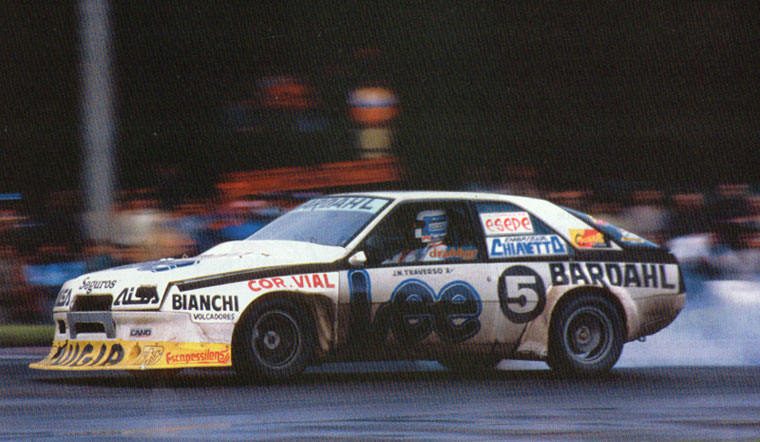
The Renault Fuego won 8 consecutive championships in the Argentinian TC 2000 touring car racing series between 1986 and 1993.

The company's compact and economical Renault 5 model, launched in January 1972, was another success, anticipating the 1973 energy crisis. The Renault 18 was introduced in 1978 and the larger Renault 20 in 1975.

During the mid-seventies, the already broad-based company diversified into more industries and continued to expand globally, including South East Asia. The energy crisis led Renault to again attempt to attack the North American market. Despite the Dauphine's success in the United States in the late 1950s and an unsuccessful assembly project in Saint-Bruno-de-Montarville, Quebec (1964–72), Renault began to disappear from North America at the end of the decade.

Renault acquired a controlling stake in Automobiles Alpine in 1973, and over the decades, Renault developed a collaborative partnership with Nash Motors Rambler and its successor American Motors Corporation (AMC). From 1962 until 1967, Renault assembled complete knock down (CKD) kits of the Rambler Classic sedans in its factory in Belgium. Renault did not have large or luxury cars in its product line and the "Rambler Renault" was positioned as an alternative to the Mercedes-Benz "Fintail" cars. Later, Renault continued to make and sell a hybrid of AMC's Rambler American and Rambler Classic called the Renault Torino in Argentina (sold through IKA-Renault). Renault partnered with AMC on other projects, such as a rotary concept engine in the late 1960s.

In the late 1960s and 1970s, the company established subsidiaries in Eastern Europe, most notably Dacia in Romania, and South America (many of which remain active) and forged technological cooperation agreements with Volvo and Peugeot, (for instance, for the development of the PRV V6 engine, which was used in Renault 30, Peugeot 604, and Volvo 260 in the late 1970s). In the mid-1960s, Renault Australia was set up in Melbourne. The company produced and assembled models including the R8, R10, R12, R16, sporty R15, R17 coupes, R18, and R20. The unit closed in 1981 and the factory closed with LNC Industries taking over import and distribution of Renaults in Australia.

When Peugeot acquired Citroën and formed PSA, the group's collaboration with Renault was reduced, although established joint production projects were maintained. Prior its merging with Peugeot, Citroën sold to Renault the truck and bus manufacturer Berliet in December 1974, merging it with its subsidiary Saviem in 1978 to create Renault Véhicules Industriels, which became the only French manufacturer of heavy commercial vehicles. In 1976, Renault reorganised the company into four business areas: automobiles (for car and light commercial vehicles or LCVs), finance and services, commercial vehicles (coaches and trucks over 2.5 tons GVW), and minor operations under an industrial enterprises division (farm machinery, plastics, foundry, etc.). In 1980, Renault produced 2,053,677 cars and LCVs. The cars at the time were the Renault 4, 5, 6, 7, 12, 14, 16, 18, 20, and 30; the LCVs were the 4, 5, and 12 Société and the Estafette. The company added 54,086 buses/coaches and trucks.

In North America, Renault partnered with American Motors Corporation (AMC), lending AMC operating capital and buying a minority 22.5% stake in the company in late 1979. The first Renault model sold through AMC's dealerships was the R5, renamed Renault Le Car. Jeep was keeping AMC afloat until new products, particularly the XJ Cherokee, could be launched. When the bottom fell out of the four-wheel drive (4×4) truck market in early 1980, AMC was in danger of bankruptcy. To protect its investment, Renault bailed AMC out with cash – at the price of a controlling 47.5% interest. Renault replaced some AMC executives, and Jose Dedeurwaerder of Renault became President of AMC.

The partnership resulted in the marketing of Jeep vehicles in Europe. The Jeep Cherokee (XJ) Motor vehicle may have been a joint AMC/Renault project since some early sketches of the XJ series were made in collaboration by Renault and AMC engineers (AMC insisted that the XJ Cherokee was designed by AMC personnel; even though a former Renault engineer designed the Quadra-Link front suspension for the XJ series). The Jeep also used wheels and seats from Renault. Part of AMC's overall strategy was to save manufacturing costs by using Renault's parts and engineering expertise when practical. This led to the improvement of the venerable AMC inline six – a Renault/Bendix-based port electronic fuel injection system (usually called Renix) transformed it into a modern, competitive powerplant with a jump from 110 to 177 hp (82 to 132 kW) with less displacement (from 4.2 to 4.0 litres). The XJC Cherokee concept, which was conceived in 1983 as a successor to the XJ series, was also a joint collaboration with AMC and Renault engineers until the design was inherited by the Chrysler Corporation in late 1987 after Renault divested AMC – which debuted in 1989 as the Jeep Concept 1 (evolving into the Jeep Grand Cherokee in April 1992).

The Renault-AMC marketing effort in passenger cars was unsuccessful compared to the popularity of Jeep vehicles. This was because, by the time the Renault range was ready, the second energy crisis was over, taking with it much of the desire for economical, compact cars. One exception was the Renault Alliance (an Americanised version of the Renault 9), which debuted for the 1983 model year. Assembled at AMC's Kenosha, Wisconsin plant, the Alliance received Motor Trend's domestic Car of The Year award in 1983. The Alliance's 72% US content allowed it to qualify as a domestic vehicle, making it the first car with a foreign nameplate to win the award. (In 2000, Motor Trend did away with separate awards for domestic and imported vehicles.) A surprising side effect of the AMC linkup was that Renault felt the effects of the Arab League boycott of companies doing business with Israel, as AMC built Jeeps there under license. Plans to sell the Renault 9 in the Middle East were mothballed as a result.

Introductions in the US during the 1980s included the Renault Alliance GTA and GTA convertible – an automatic-top convertible with a 2.0 L engine – big for a car of its class and the Renault Fuego coupé. The Alliance was followed by the Encore (US version of the Renault 11), an Alliance-based hatchback. In 1982, Renault become the second European automaker to build cars in the US, after Volkswagen. However, bland styling and poor product quality proved insurmountable.

Eventually, Renault sold AMC to Chrysler in 1987 after the assassination of Renault's chairman, Georges Besse by Action directe. The Renault Medallion (Renault 21 in Europe) sedan and wagon was sold from 1987 until 1989 through Jeep-Eagle dealerships. Jeep-Eagle was the division Chrysler created out of the former AMC. Renault imports ended after 1989. A completely new full-sized 4-door sedan, the Eagle Premier, was developed during the partnership between AMC and Renault. The Premier design, as well as its state-of-the-art manufacturing facility in Bramalea, Ontario, Canada, were the starting point for the sleek LH sedans such as the Eagle Vision and Chrysler 300M.

In early 1979, as part of its attempts to expand into the US market, Renault bought a 20% stake in truck manufacturer Mack. The aim of this operation was to make use of the company's extensive dealership network to distribute light trucks. In 1983, Renault increased its stake in Mack to 44.6%. In 1987, it transferred the ownership of a 42% stake to Renault Véhicules Industriels.

In the late 1970s and early 1980s, Renault increased its involvement in motorsport, with novel inventions such as turbochargers in its Formula One cars. Renault's Head of Engines, Georges Douin, orchestrated the installation of turbocharged engines across much of the Renault range beginning in 1980. 10% of all turbocharged European cars in 1984 were Renaults. The company's road car designs were revolutionary in other ways also – the Renault Espace was one of the first minivans and was to remain the most well-known minivan in Europe for the next two decades. The second-generation Renault 5, the European Car of the Year-winning Renault 9, and the most luxurious Renault yet, the aerodynamic 25, were all released in the early 1980s. At the same time, poor product quality damaged the brand. The ill-fated Renault 14 may have been the culmination of these problems in the early 1980s.

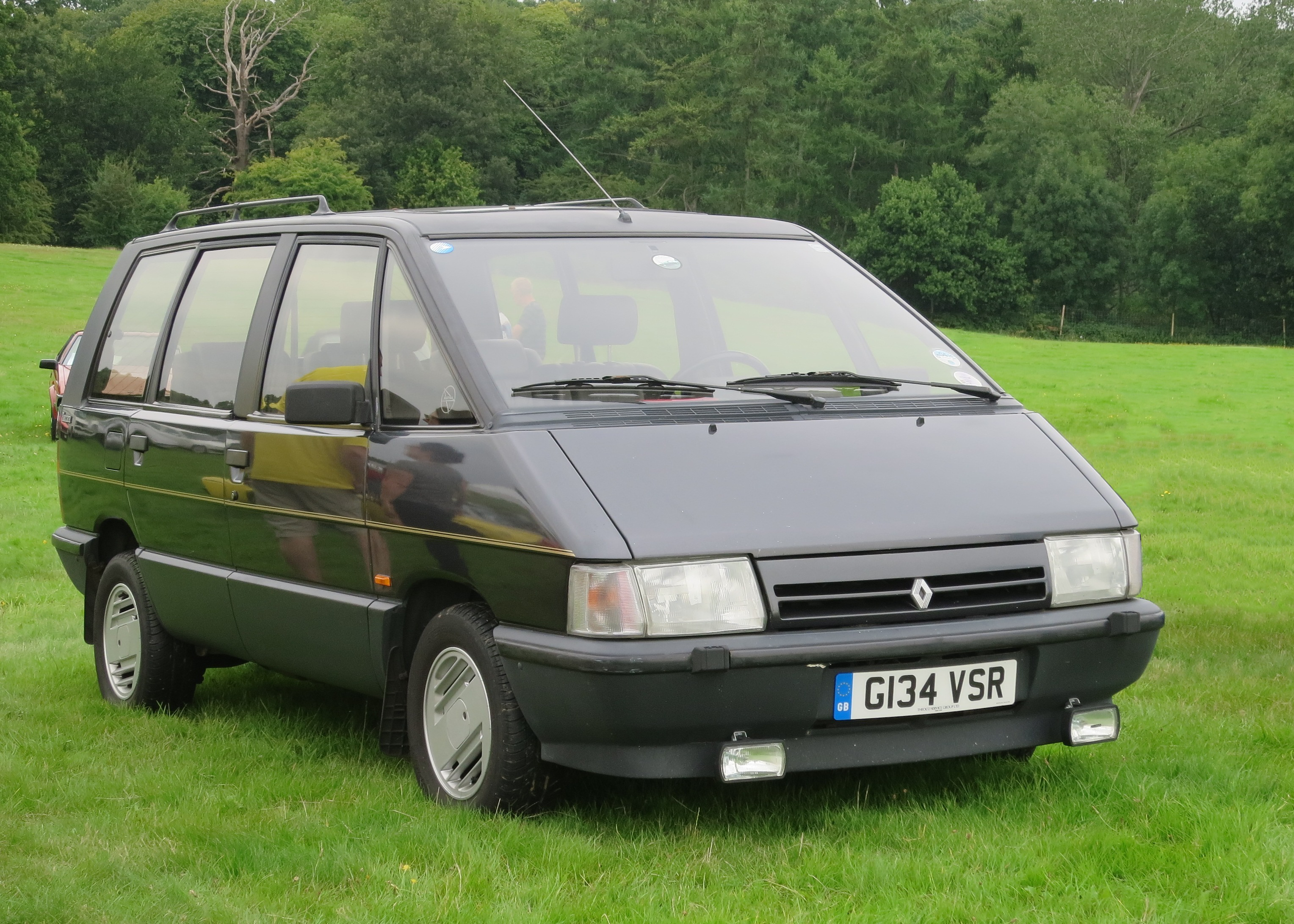
1985 Renault Espace, the first European multi-purpose vehicle

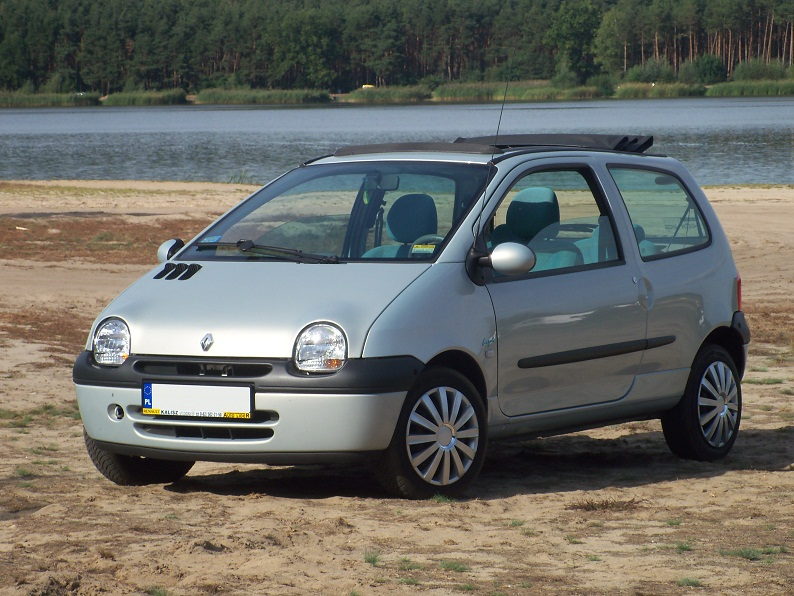
Renault Twingo popularized the city car in Europe from 1992. Six years later, most of its rivals began to enter the city car market.

=== Restructuring (1981–1995) ===
Renaults were somewhat successful on both road and track, including the 1984 Espace launch, which was Europe's first multi-purpose vehicle, a dozen years before any competitor. However, Renault was losing a billion francs a month totaling ₣12.5 billion in 1984. The government intervened and Georges Besse was installed as chairman; he set about cutting costs dramatically, selling many of Renault's non-core assets (Volvo stake, Gitane, Eurocar, and Renix), withdrawing almost entirely from motorsports, and laying off many employees. This halved the deficit by 1986, but Besse was murdered by the communist terrorist group Action Directe in November 1986. He was replaced by Raymond Lévy, who continued Besse's initiatives, slimming the company enough that by the end of 1987, Renault was more or less financially stable. However, while Besse was convinced that Renault needed a presence in the North American market and wanted to push forward with restructuring AMC, Lévy, facing domestic losses from Renault at home, and losses from AMC in the US, along with the political climate that led to Besse's assassination, decided to sell AMC to Chrysler that same year.

The Renault 9, a small four-door family saloon, was voted European Car of the Year on its 1981 launch. It sold well in France, but was eventually eclipsed by its sister vehicle, the Renault 11 hatchback, as the hatchback body style became more popular in this size of the car. The Renault 5 entered its second generation in 1984 and continued to sell well. The long-running Renault 18 was replaced by the Renault 21 early in 1986, adding a seven-seater estate badged as the Nevada or Savanna depending on where it was sold. Renault's top-of-the-range model in the 1980s was the Renault 25, launched at the end of 1983.

In 1990, Renault strengthened its collaboration with Volvo by signing an agreement that allowed both companies to reduce vehicle conception costs and purchasing expenses. Renault had access to Volvo's expertise in upper market segments and in return, Volvo exploited Renault's designs for low and medium segments. In 1993, the two companies announced their intention to merge operations by 1 January 1994 and increased their cross-shareholding. The French accepted the merger, while Volvo shareholders rejected it.

A revitalised Renault launched successful new cars in the early 1990s, accompanied by an improved marketing effort on European markets, including the 5 replacement, the Clio in May 1990. The Clio was the first new model of a generation that replaced numeric identifiers with traditional nameplates. The Clio was voted European Car of the Year soon after its launch, and was one of Europe's best-selling cars in the 1990s, proving even more popular than its predecessor. Other important launches included the third-generation Espace in 1996 and the innovative Twingo in 1992, the first car to be marketed as a city car MPV (multi-purpose vehicle). The Twingo was roomier than any prior cars of its size range. Twingo sales reached 2.4 million in Europe, even though the original was only built for (Continental) left-hand drive markets.

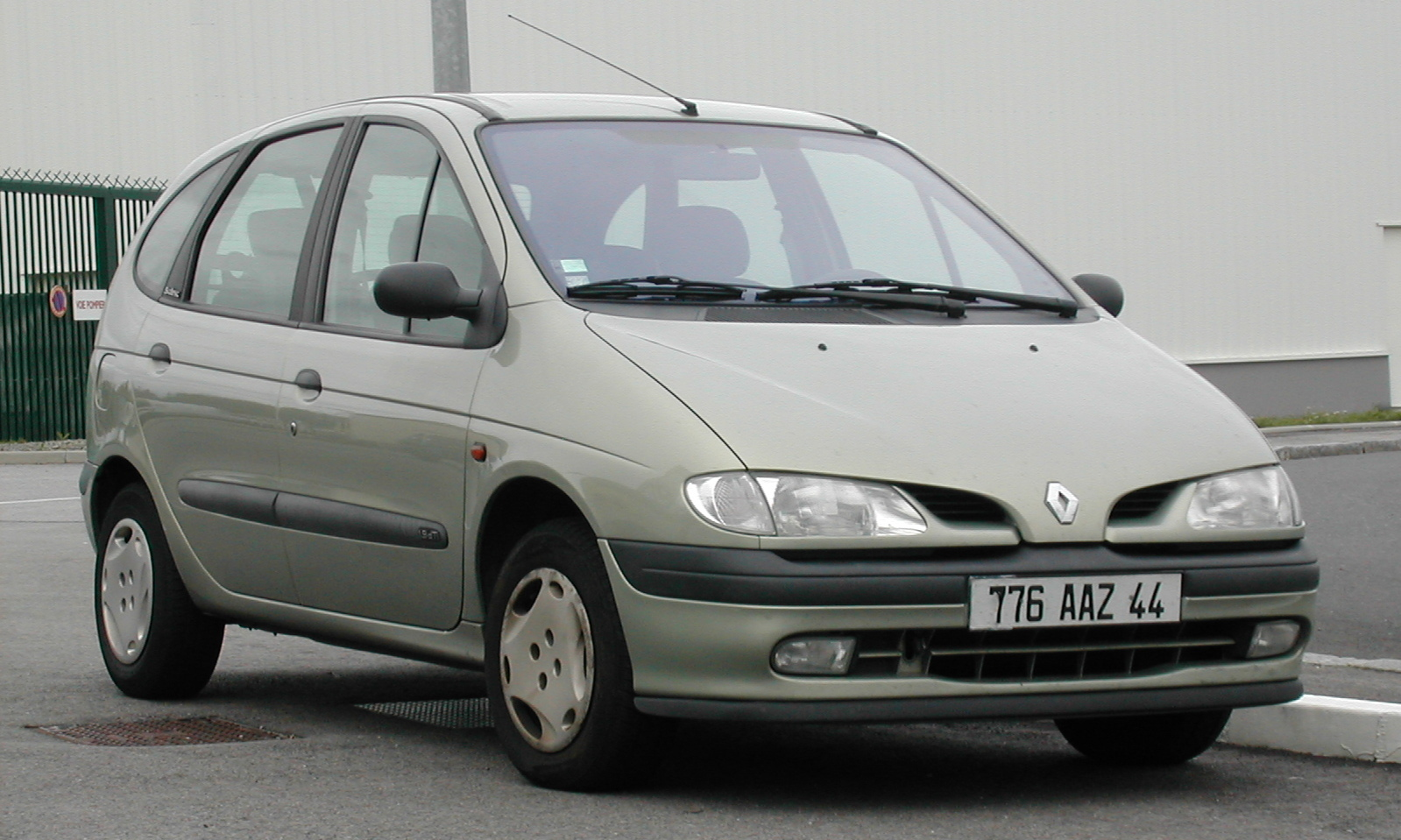
Renault Scénic, awarded Car of the year in Europe in 1997 and the first car to be marketed as a compact MPV, is the most popular MPV in Europe for 20 years.

=== Privatisation and the alliance era (1996–2019) ===
It was eventually decided that the company's state-owned status was a detriment. By 1994, plans to sell shares to public investors were officially announced. The company was privatised in 1996. This new freedom allowed the company to venture once again into markets in Eastern Europe and South America, including a new factory in Brazil and upgrades for its infrastructure in Argentina and Turkey. In December 1996, General Motors Europe and Renault began to collaborate in the development of LCVs, starting with the second generation Trafic (codenamed X83).

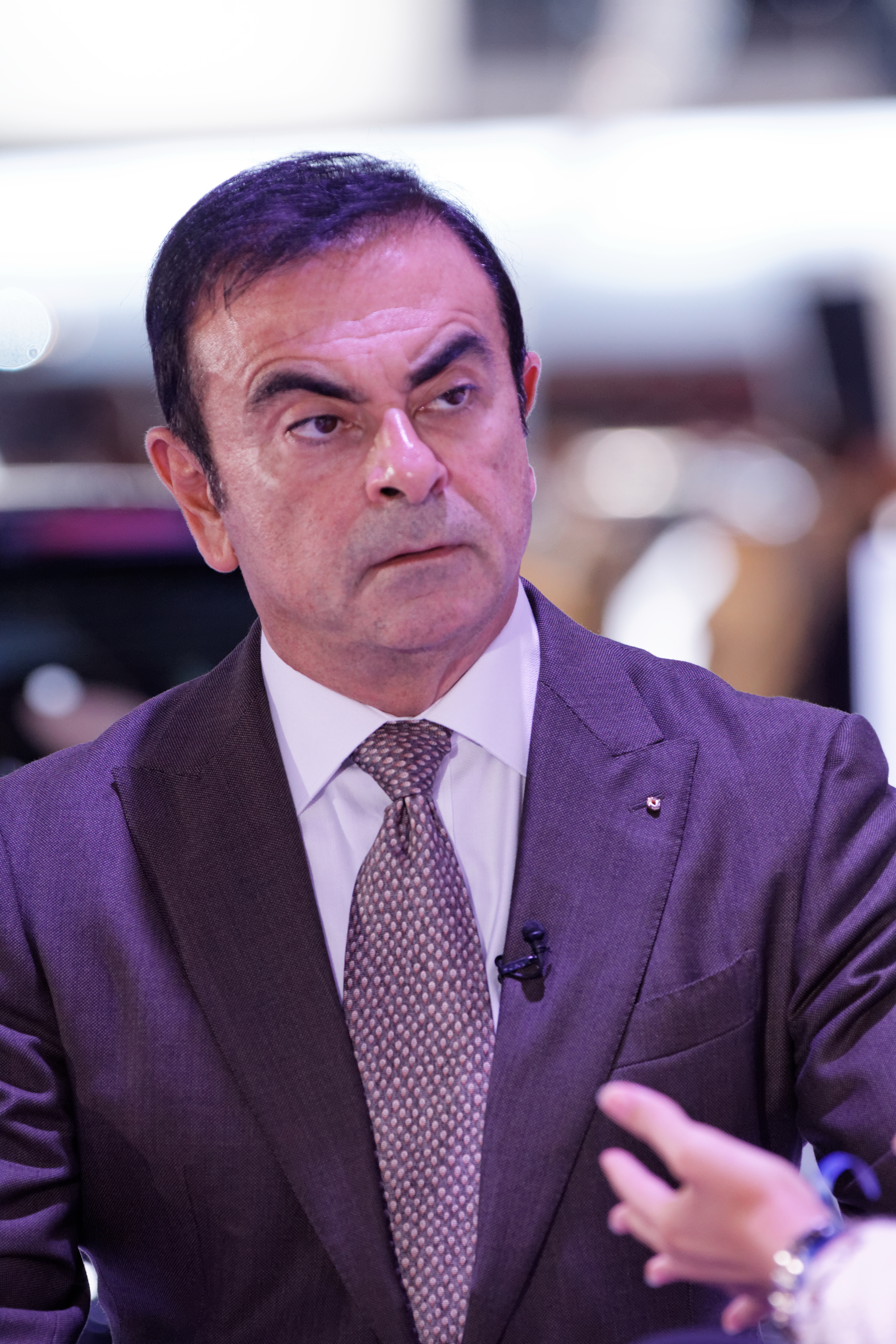
Carlos Ghosn led Renault's cost cutting effort in 1998–2000.

Renault's financial problems were not all fixed by the privatisation, and Renault's president, Louis Schweitzer gave to his then deputy, Carlos Ghosn, the task of confronting them. Ghosn elaborated a plan to cut costs for the period 1998–2000, reducing the workforce, revising production processes, standardising vehicle parts and pushing the launch of new models. The company also undertook organisational changes, introducing a lean production system with delegate responsibilities inspired by Japanese systems (the "Renault Production Way"), reforming work methods, and centralising research and development at its Technocentre to reduce vehicle conception costs while accelerating such conception.

After Volvo's exit, Renault searched for a new partner to cope with an industry that was consolidating. Talks with BMW, Mitsubishi, Nissan, PSA and others were held and yielded a relationship with Nissan, whose negotiations with Daimler had stalled. Starting on 27 March 1999, the Renault–Nissan Alliance is the first of its kind involving a Japanese and a French company, including cross-ownership. Renault initially acquired a 36.8% stake at a cost of £2.7 billion in Nissan, while Nissan, a couple of years later, took a 15% non-voting stake in Renault. Renault continued to operate as a stand-alone company, but with the intent to collaborate with its alliance partner to reduce costs. The same year, Renault bought a 51% majority stake of the Romanian company Dacia for £408.5 million, thus returning after 30 years, in which time the Romanians had built over 2 million cars that primarily consisted of local versions of the Renault 8, 12 and 20. In 2000, Renault acquired a controlling stake of the newly formed South Korean Samsung Group's automotive division for £59.5 million.

In Japan, Renault was formerly licensed by Yanase Co, Japan's premier seller of imported cars. However, as a result of Renault's purchase of an interest in Nissan in 1999, Yanase cancelled its licensing contract with Renault in the spring of 2000, and Nissan took over as the sole licensee, hence sales of Renault vehicles in Japan were transferred from Yanase Store locations to Nissan Red Stage Store locations.

In the late 1990s and early 2000s, Renault sold various assets to finance its inversions and acquisitions, refocusing itself as a car and van manufacturer. In 1999, the company sold its industrial automation subsidiary, Renault Automation, to Comau and its engine parts division to TWR Engine Components. In 2001, Renault sold its 50% stake in bus/coach manufacturer Irisbus to co-owner Iveco and its logistics subsidiary, CAT France, to Global Automotive Logistics. Following the sale of Renault Véhicules Industriels to Volvo in 2001, the company retained a minority (but controlling) stake (20%) in the Volvo Group. In 2010 Renault reduced its shareholding to 6.5% and in December 2012 sold its remaining shares. In 2004, Renault sold a 51% majority stake in its agricultural machinery division, Renault Agriculture, to CLAAS. In 2006, CLAAS increased its ownership to 80% and in 2008 took full control.

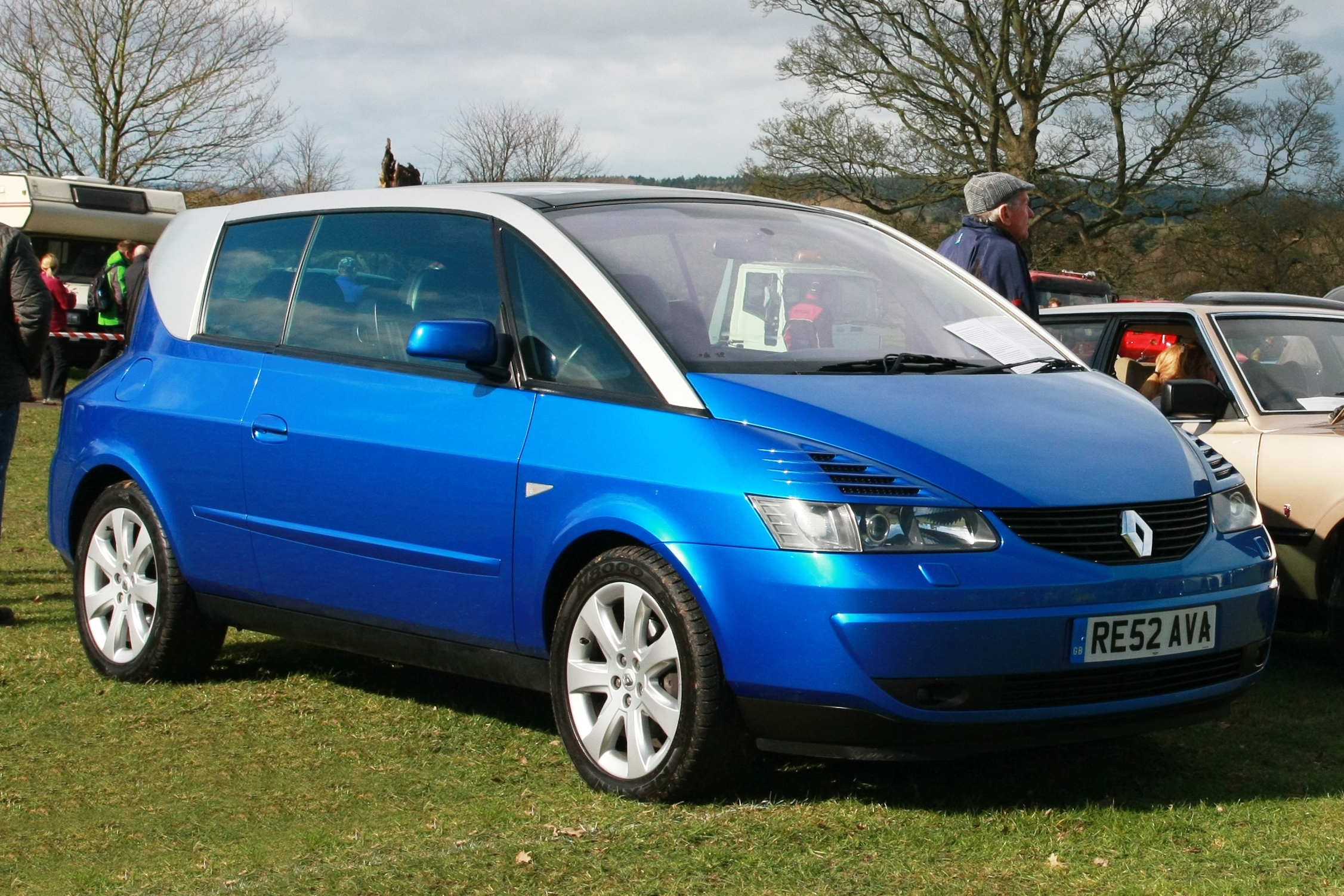
The Renault Avantime three-door MPV showcases Renault's distinctive design in early 2000s.

In the twenty-first century, Renault developed a reputation for distinctive, outlandish design. The second generation of the Laguna and Mégane featured ambitious, angular designs that turned out to be successful, The 2000 Laguna was the second European car to feature "keyless" entry and ignition. Less successful were the company's more upmarket models. The Avantime, a unique coupé multi-purpose vehicle, sold poorly and was quickly discontinued while the luxury Vel Satis model also disappointed. However, the design inspired the lines of the second-generation Mégane, the maker's most successful car. As well as its distinctive styling, Renault was to become known for its car safety by the independent company Euro NCAP Thus, in 2001, the Laguna achieved a five-star rating, followed in 2004 by the Modus, and acquired control of AvtoVAZ in 2008.

In April 2010, Renault–Nissan announced an alliance with Daimler. Renault supplied Mercedes-Benz with its brand new 1.6-litre turbo-diesel engine and Mercedes-Benz provided a 2.0 litre four-cylinder petrol engine to Renault–Nissan. The resulting new alliance was to develop a replacement for the Smart based on the Twingo.

In February 2010, Renault opened a new production factory near Tangier, Morocco, with an annual output capacity of 170,000 vehicles. Initially, it manufactured the Dacia Lodgy and Dacia Dokker models followed in October 2013 by the second generation Dacia Sandero. The output capacity increased to 340,000 vehicles per year with the inauguration of a second production line. The site is located in a dedicated free trade area, neighboring Tanger Automotive City. According to Renault, the new factory emits zero carbon and industrial liquid discharges. Over 100,000 vehicles were produced there in 2013. Renault expects to eventually increase production at the Tangier plant to 400,000 vehicles per year.

In the 2010s, Renault increased its efforts to gain market share in the Chinese market. In 2013, it formed a joint venture with Dongfeng Motor Group named as Dongfeng Renault, based on a failed previous venture with the Chinese company Sanjiang. In December 2017, it signed an agreement with Brilliance Auto to create a new joint venture (Renault Brilliance Jinbei) aimed at producing light commercial vehicles and minivans under the Renault, Jinbei and Huasong marques. In December 2018, Renault announced it would acquire a "significant" stake in JMCG's electric vehicle subsidiary JMEV. In July 2019, Renault took a 50% majority stake from JMEV through capital increase. In April 2020, Renault announced it planned to withdraw from the Dongfeng Renault venture, transferring its stake to Dongfeng.

In December 2012, the Algeria's National Investment Fund (FNI), the Société Nationale de Véhicules Industriels (SNVI), and Renault signed an agreement to establish a factory near the city of Oran, Algeria, with the aim of manufacturing Symbol units from 2014 onwards. The production output was estimated at 25,000 vehicles. The Algerian State has a 51% stake in the facility.

In September 2013, Renault launched its brand in Indonesia, the world's fourth most populous country, with the aim of becoming one of the top European brands there until 2016. The model range at the time of the launch consisted of the Duster (locally assembled), the Koleos and the Mégane RS. Later, the Clio and the Captur were also added.

In April 2015, the French government upped its stake in Renault from 15% to 19.73% with the aim of blocking a resolution at the next annual general meeting that could reduce its control over the company. In 2017, the government sold back shares and returned to a 15% stake as agreed with Renault.

During 2016, Renault changed position on the viability of small (B-segment) diesel cars in Europe, as they become significantly more expensive when re-engineered to comply with new emissions regulations as a result of the Volkswagen emissions scandal. Renault believes that all small and some mid-size (C-segment) will no longer be diesels by 2020. However, on Friday, 13 January 2017, Renault shares fell as the Paris prosecutor started an investigation into possible exhaust emissions cheating. The company later recalled 15,000 cars for emission testing and fixing. Renault, along with several other automobile companies, has been accused of manipulating the measurement equipment for NO_{x} pollution from diesel cars. Independent tests carried out by the German car club ADAC proved that, under normal driving conditions, diesel vehicles, including the Renault Espace, exceeded legal European emission limits for nitrogen oxide (NO_{x}) by more than 10 times. Renault denied any foul play, stating compliance with French and European standards.

In November 2018, Renault's CEO Ghosn was arrested by Japanese officials for allegedly underreporting his Nissan's salary, following an internal review conducted by the Japanese company. Renault traded shares fell more than 15% after the arrest was known. After Ghosn's arrest, the chief operating officer and company deputy chief Thierry Bolloré became the acting CEO and the board director Philippe Lagayette the acting chairman. In January 2019, following Ghosn's resignation, Renault announced it had appointed Jean-Dominique Senard as chairman and the acting CEO Bolloré as CEO. In October 2019, Bolloré was fired and replaced by Renault's CFO Clotilde Delbos as acting CEO. Bolloré said his dismissal was a "coup" by Senard. In January 2020, Renault announced it had named Italian Luca de Meo as its new CEO, with him taking his post on 1 July. Delbos was named as his deputy.

=== COVID-19, Russo-Ukrainian war, and Alliance reforms (2019–present) ===
In May 2020, Renault announced a cost-cutting plan aimed at eliminating 15,000 jobs worldwide, about 10% of the company's workforce, due to falling sales and the COVID-19 pandemic.

In January 2021, as part of a company revamp, Renault said it would divide its automotive division into four business units: Renault, Dacia and Lada, Alpine, and Mobilize (the latter for new "new mobility services").

In April 2021, Renault said that its revenue fell by 1.1% from the beginning of 2021 until March and it will reduce car production and focus on models with higher margins.

Following the 2022 Russian invasion of Ukraine, many international, particularly Western companies pulled out of Russia. Unlike most of its Western competitors, Renault was slow to announce divestment or scaling back of its operations in Russia, drawing criticism. On 21 March 2022, after a brief halt, Renault resumed production at the Renault Russia car plant near Moscow. In May 2022, Renault sold 100% of its shares in Renault Russia to the city of Moscow and its 67.69% interest in AvtoVAZ to the Russian Central Research and Development Automobile and Engine Institute for a symbolic one rouble. The agreement provides an option for Renault to buy back its interest in AvtoVAZ within six years.

In November 2022, Renault said it plans to spin off the electric car development into a subsidiary company tentatively called Ampère. It also plans to spin off its powertrain production and development operations (including internal combustion engines and hybrid systems) into a joint venture company named Horse with Geely as co-owner.

In January 2023, Renault said it intended to transfer almost 30% of its controlling stake in Nissan to a French trust (pending approval by both companies), reducing its shares with voting rights to a minority 15% and, in doing so, making Nissan shares in Renault to gain voting rights. The shareholding and voting ratio of both companies is set to be fixed in the future. The agreement also included Nissan investing in Ampere and projects in various markets. In February 2023, both companies approved the going-ahead for the shareholding changes. Final details and regulatory clearances for the transaction were set to be completed by the first quarter of 2023 and it would be done by the fourth quarter. The companies also approved joint projects and Nissan's Ampere investment. The share transfer was completed in November 2023.

On March 31, 2025, Renault announced plans to acquire Nissan’s 51% stake in its Indian manufacturing unit

In June 2025, Renault announced Luca de Meo had resigned as its CEO. Renault began production of drones in Ukraine in 2025. The decision was opposed by the Confédération Genérale du Travail and Force Ouvrière unions.

In July 2026, amid the Dieselgate scandal, British courts dismissed the allegations against five manufacturers, including Renault, ruling in their favor.

=== Innovations ===
- 1899 Louis Renault "Driving, speed-changing mechanism and reversing gear" Louis Renault invented a revolutionary direct drive gear with no drive belt, with much better uphill performances.
- 1961 – Renault 4 was the first serial car with hatchback body style
- 1963 – Renault 8 was the first serial car with four-wheel disc brake system
- 1980 – First patents for "Braking distribution device for total adherence"
- 1982 – Renault Fuego was the first serial car with keyless entry.
- 1988 CARMINAT, a real-time system for location and weather information. This program received European support from 1988, under the code Eureka EU-55 CARMINAT. These innovations for the real-time location and human-machine interfaces are included in the Renault R-link system and Carminat TomTom devices.
- 2000 – Renault Laguna was the second European car to feature "keyless" entry and ignition.

== Motorsport ==
1907 Renault-built Replica of its French Grand Prix winner, one of 4 known to exist

Renault took part in motorsport at the beginning of the 20th century, promoted by Marcel Renault's racing interests and over the years acquired companies with a sporting connection such as Gordini and Alpine.

In the 1970s, Renault set up a dedicated motorsport division called Renault Sport, and, in 1978, won the 24 Hours of Le Mans with the Renault Alpine A442. Renault has also achieved success in both rallying and in Formula One over the past few decades.

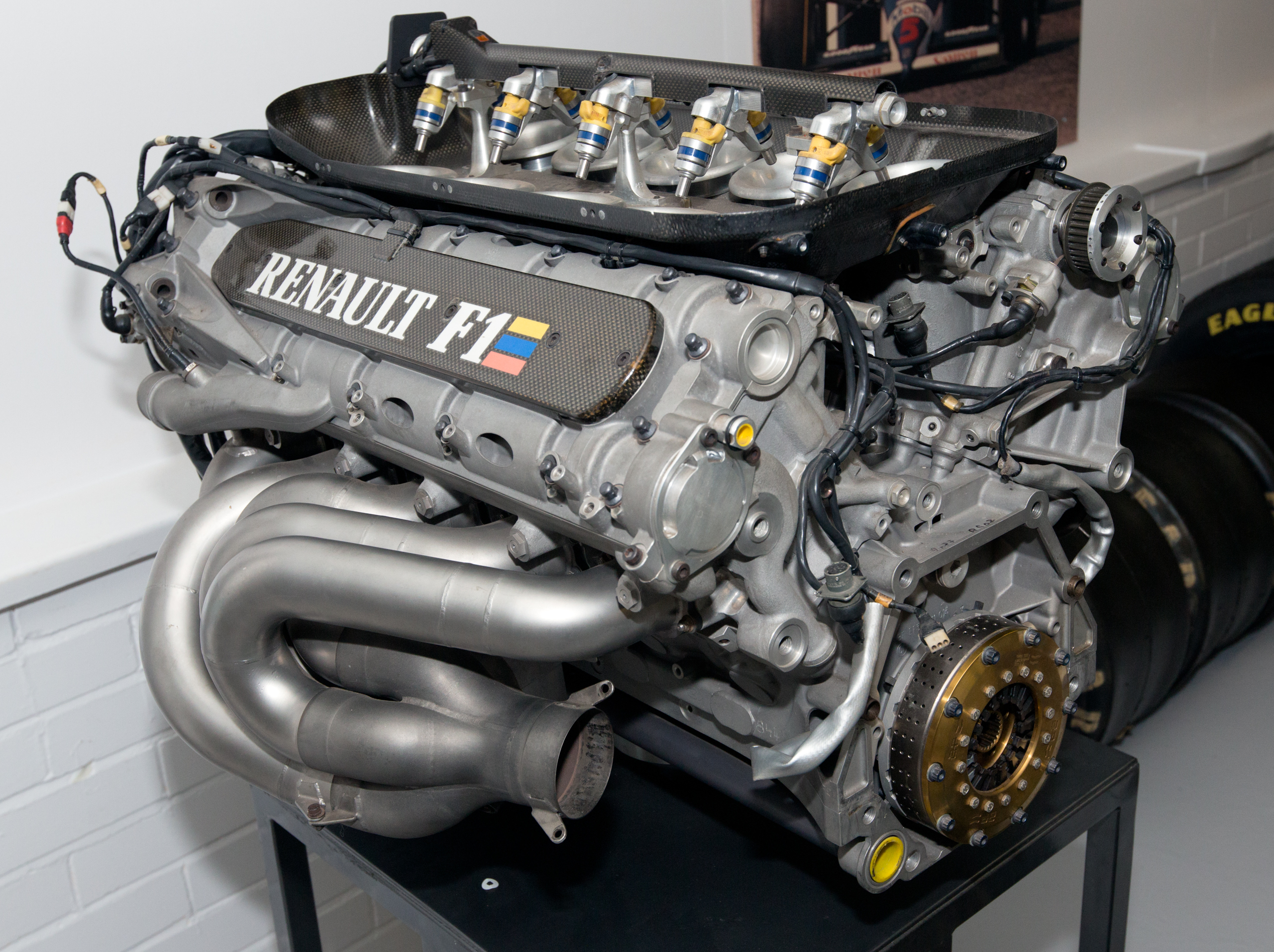
Renault has won twelve F1 Championships as engine manufacturer in Formula One. Nigel Mansell, Damon Hill, Michael Schumacher, Alain Prost, Fernando Alonso, Sebastian Vettel and Jacques Villeneuve won eleven F1 driver's titles with cars powered by Renault engines.

The company has also backed various one-make single-seater series such as Formula Renault and the Formula Renault 3.5. These two racing series were a step in the career of thousands of drivers, including Formula One champions Fernando Alonso, Sebastian Vettel, Kimi Räikkönen and Lewis Hamilton, as well as IndyCar champion Will Power.

Renault Sport develops and manufactures the Renault Sport-badged cars, as the Renault Clio RS (for Renault Sport) and the Renault Mégane RS, which own the world records in their categories, such as the Nürburgring, and the Suzuka circuit and awards from What Car?, Evo, and other magazines.

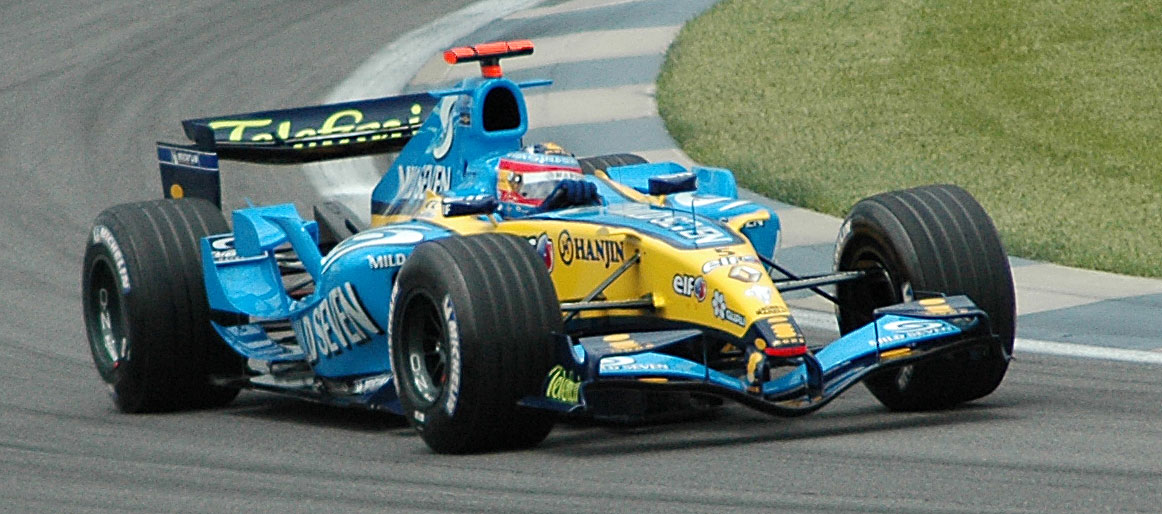
Fernando Alonso driving for Renault F1 at Indianapolis in 2005, the year in which the Renault team won the first of its two Formula One championships

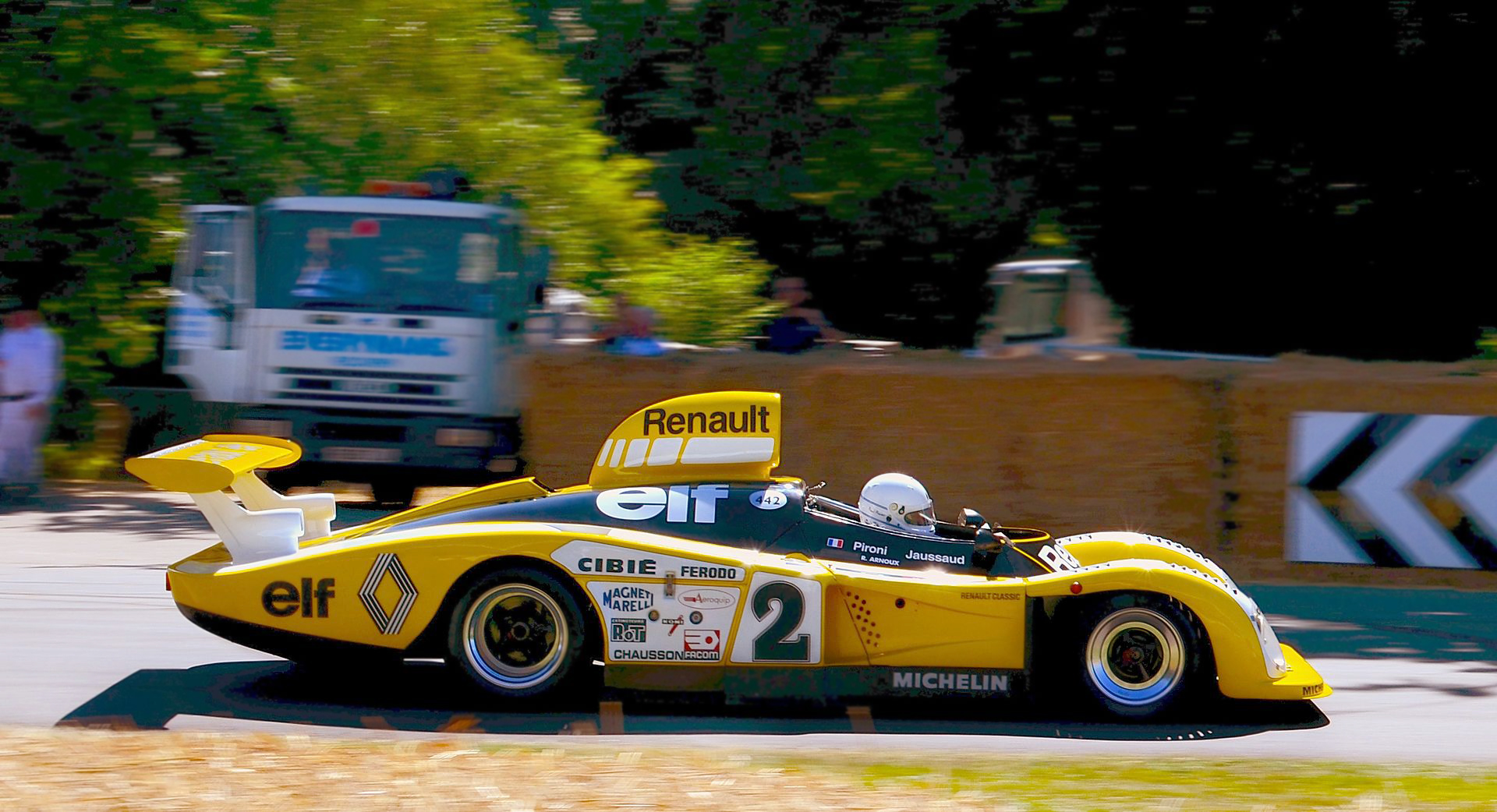
The Renault Alpine A442, 1978 Le Mans 24 Hours winner, at the 2014 Goodwood Festival of Speed

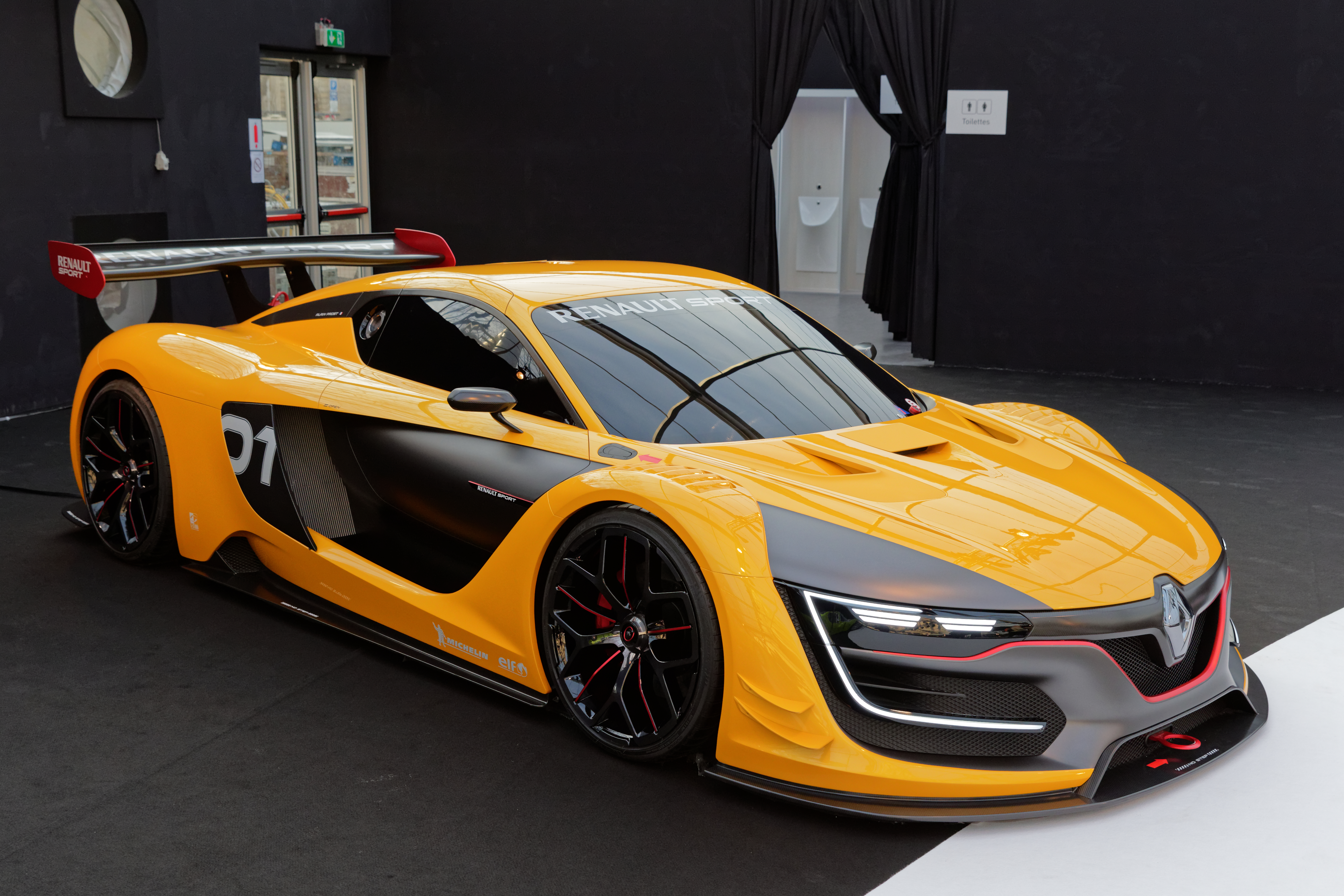
Renault Sport R.S. 01

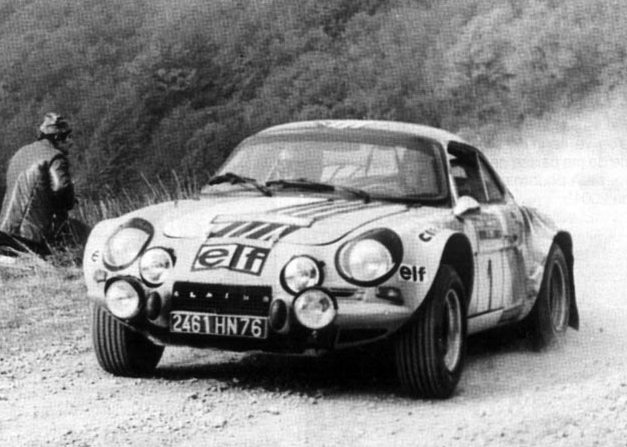
Renault Alpine A110, first Champion of the World Rally Championship

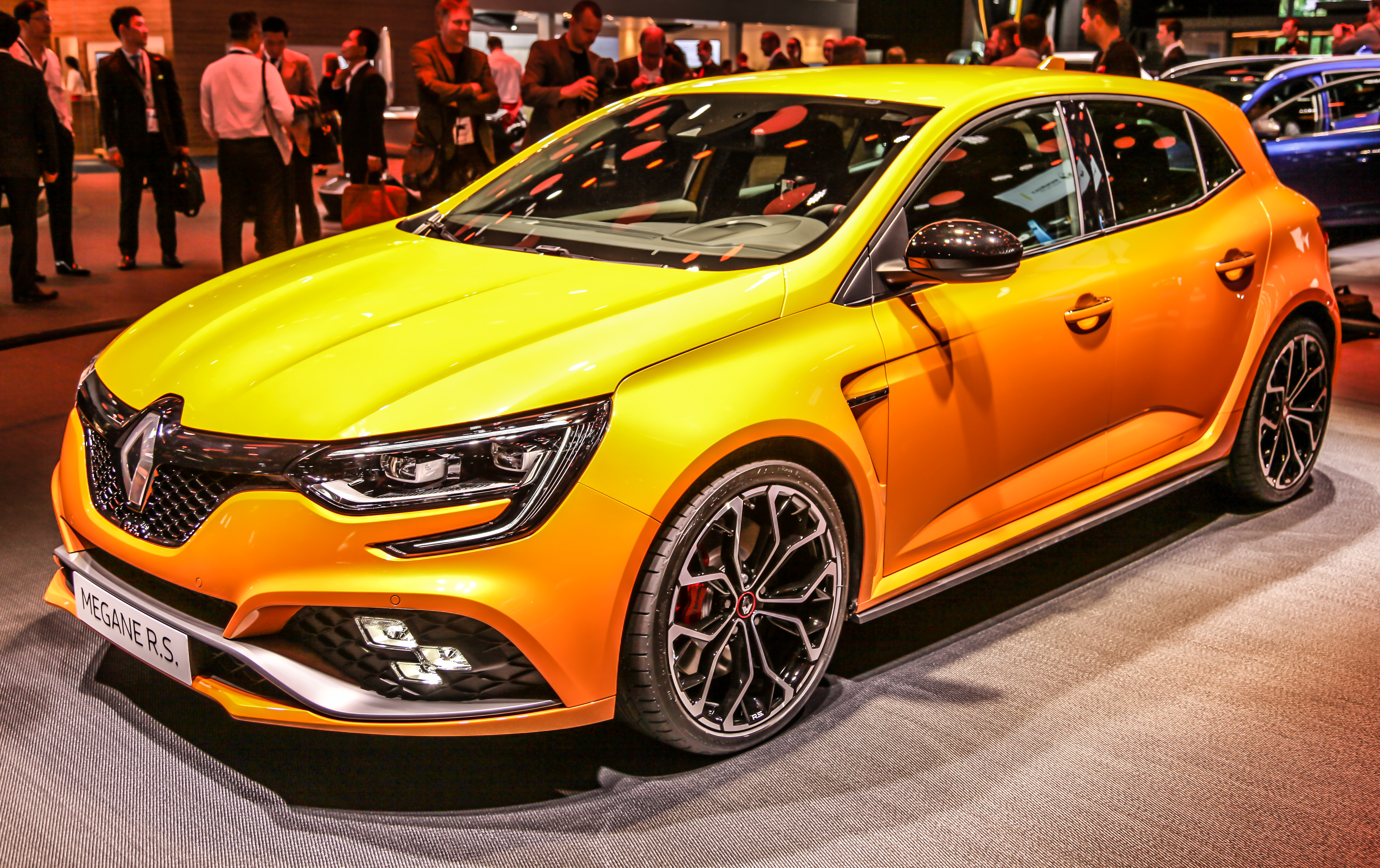
Renault Megane RS, IAA 2017

=== Formula One ===
Renault introduced the turbo engine to Formula One when it debuted its first car, the Renault RS01 at Silverstone in 1977. The Renault team continued until 1986. From 1989 Renault supplied engines for the successful Williams-Renault car.

Renault took over the Benetton Formula team in 2000 for the 2001 season and renamed it Renault F1 in 2002. In 2005 and 2006 the team won the Constructors' and Drivers' titles (with Fernando Alonso). At the 2005 French Grand Prix Carlos Ghosn set out his policy regarding the company's involvement in motorsport:

"We are not in Formula One out of habit or tradition. We're here to show our talent and that we can do it properly ... Formula One is a cost if you don't get the results. Formula One is an investment if you do have them and know how to exploit them."

Renault powered the winning 2010 Red Bull Racing team, and took a similar role with its old team in December 2010, when it sold its final stake to the investment group Genii Capital, the main stakeholder since December 2009, ending Renault's direct role in running a F1 team for the second time.

Renault bought the Enstone-based team for the 2016 season, rebranding it Renault. In 2021, the team was renamed Alpine F1 Team and became part of the new Alpine business unit, with Renault retained as the engine nameplate. Renault will stop manufacturing F1 engines at Viry-Châtillon after the 2025 season.

=== Rallying ===
Renault has been involved in rallying from an early era. Marcel Renault won the 1902 Rallye Paris-Vienna, but lost his life while competing in the 1903 Paris-Madrid rally.

During the 1950s and 1960s, Renault manufactured several small cars with rear wheel drive in some cases, as the 4CV, the R8 or the Dauphine. These cars were well-adapted to the rally of the time, and the tuner Amedee Gordini collaborated with its performance. In the 1950s the Renault Dauphine won several international rallies, including the 1956 Mille Miglia and the 1958 Monte Carlo Rally.

In 1973, Renault took control of Automobiles Alpine, a related company for several years, which was responsible for building successful rally cars such as the A110. A highly evolved A110 won the first World Rally Championship, representing Alpine-Renault.

In 1976, the Alpine's competition department and the Gordini factory at Viry-Chatillon were merged into Renault Sport. The focus shifted to Formula One, although Renault achieved several victories including the 1981 Monte Carlo Rally with the Renault 5 Turbo before retirement from the world rally in late 1994.

Renault cars also participate of cross-country races, most prominently the Dakar Rally. The Marreau brothers won the 1982 edition driving a Renault 20 Turbo 4x4 prototype.

Later, Renault provided a Renault Megane platform and sponsored the Schlesser-Renault Elf buggies that won the 1999 and 2000 editions. The 1999 car was the first two-wheel drive Dakar's winner.

Renaults won the European Rally Championship four times, in 1970, 1999, 2004 and 2005.

== Financial data ==
Financial data in € billions
Year	2013	2014	2015	2016	2017	2018	2019	2020	2021	2022	2023
Revenue	40.932	41.055	45.327	51.243	58.770	57.419	55.537	43.474	41.659	46.328	52.376
Net income	0.695	1.998	2.960	3.543	5.210	3.302	-141	-8.046	0.967	-0.716	2.315
Assets	74.992	81.551	90.605	102.103	109.943	114.996	122.171	115.737	113.740	118.319	121.913
Employees	121,807	117,395	120,136	124,849	181,344	183,002	179,565	170,158	156,466	105,812	105,497

== Production ==
=== Country-wise production ===
Top 10 Groupe Renault vehicle sales by country, 2023
Rank	Location	Vehicle sales	Market share
1	France	551,373	25.6%
2	Italy	187,249	10.6%
3	Turkey	176,963	14.4%
4	Germany	156,729	5.0%
5	Spain	134,398	12.3%
6	Brazil	126,203	5.8%
7	United Kingdom	102,980	4.6%
8	Belgium	62,771	10.5%
9	Romania	61,445	38.1%
10	Morocco	60,290	37.3%
11	Argentina	51,790	12.2%
12	Poland	49,557	9.2%
13	India	48,321	1%
14	Mexico	43,779	3.2%
15	Netherlands	39,688	9%

=== Vehicle production ===
Below is the ranking of vehicle production in Renault group factories in 2023:

Location	Vehicle produced (units)
Mioveni (Romania)	322,086
Tangier (Morocco)	287,860
Bursa (Türkiye, Oyak Renault)	284,040
Curitiba (Brazil)	178,332
Valladolid (Spain)	172,733
Batilly (France, SoVAB)	150,260
Sandouville (France)	131,426
Palencia (Spain)	129,567
ElectriCity Maubeuge (France, Ampere)	123,149
Busan (South Korea, Renault Korea)	100,503
Casablanca (Morocco)	94,801
Córdoba (Argentina)	83,586
Chennai (India, RNAIPL)	67,266
Novo Mesto (Slovenia)	60,881
Shiyan (eGT-NEV, partner in China)	54,119
ElectriCity Douai (France, Ampere)	51,486
Bursa (Türkiye, with Karsan)	41,327
Envigado (Colombia)	34,712
Flins (France)	16,679
Dieppe (France, Alpine)	4,708
Oran (Algeria)	2,456
Total	2,391,977

=== Engine production ===
Below is the production of engines, Horse division for thermal engines and Ampere division for electric motors, in the Renault group factories in 2023:

Location	Engines produced (units)
Valladolid (Spain)	969,502
Cléon (France)	665,129 (thermal + electric)
Mioveni (Romania)	345,121
Curitiba (Brazil)	217,866
Bursa (Türkiye)	210,754
Busan (South Korea)	96,527
Total	2,504,899

=== Gearbox production ===
Below is the production of gearboxes in the Renault group factories in 2023:

Location	Gearboxes produced (units)
Seville (Spain)	596,576
Cacia (Portugal)	526,627
Mioveni (Romania)	278,509
Cléon (France)	239,990
Los Andes (Chile)	189,529
Bursa (Türkiye)	71,895
Total	1,903,126

== Corporate governance ==
Renault's head office is in Boulogne-Billancourt. The head office is located near the old Renault factories; Renault has maintained a historical presence in Boulogne-Billancourt since the company's opening in 1898.

Renault is administered through a board of directors, an executive committee and a management committee. As of January 2019, members of the 19-seat board include Jean-Dominique Senard (as chairman), Cherie Blair, Catherine Barba and Pascale Sourisse. François Provost is the current CEO as of 2025.

=== Previous CEOs ===
- Louis Renault (1899–1944)
- Pierre Lefaucheux (1944–1955)
- Pierre Dreyfus (1955–1975)
- Bernard Vernier-Palliez (1975–1981)
- Bernard Hanon (1981–1985)
- Georges Besse (1985–1986)
- Aimé Jardon (1986)
- Raymond Lévy (1986–1992)
- Louis Schweitzer (1992–2005)
- Carlos Ghosn (2005–2018)
- Luca de Meo (2019–2025)

== Products and technologies ==
Best-selling Renault Group models in 2023 including Dacia marque
Rank	Model	Sales
1	Dacia/Renault Sandero	308,781
2	Renault Clio	295,325
3	Dacia/Renault Duster	256,722
4	Renault Captur	159,562
5	Renault Trafic	128,041
6	Renault Kwid	112,472
7	Renault Master	107,005
8	Renault Trafic	106,400
9	Dacia Jogger	94,128
10	Renault Megane	87,614

=== Current models ===
Current model line up, with calendar year of introduction:

- Clio (1990–present; hatchback)
- Mégane E-Tech Electric (2021–present; hatchback)
- Kangoo (1997–present; developed by Renault and sold in some markets as the Mercedes-Benz Citan and the Nissan Townstar)
- Kardian (2024–present; crossover)
- Captur (2013–present; crossover)
- Duster Oroch (Latin America only) (2015–present; pick-up)
- Kwid (2015–present; hatchback)
- Alaskan (2016–present; pick-up)
- Triber (2019–present; mini MPV)
- Arkana (2019–present; crossover)
- Kiger (2021–present)
- Taliant (2021–present; restyled Dacia Logan)
- Austral (2022–present; crossover)
- Espace (2023–present; crossover)
- Rafale (2024–present; crossover coupé)
- Scenic E-Tech (2024–present; crossover)
- Symbioz (2024–present; crossover)
- Boreal (2025–present; crossover SUV)
- 5 E-Tech (2024–present; hatchback)
- 4 E-Tech (2025–present; crossover)
- Renault Twingo E-Tech (2026-present; hatchback)

Dacia vehicles, sold in some markets under the Renault marque:

- Duster (2009–present)

Renault Samsung vehicles, sold in some markets under the Renault marque:

- Koleos (2008–present; Renault Samsung QM5/Renault Samsung QM6)
- Arkana (2020–present; Renault Samsung XM3)
- Filante (2026–present; crossover)

Renault light commercial vehicles:

- Master (1980–present; developed by Renault and sold in some markets as the Nissan Interstar)
- Trafic (1980–present; developed by Renault and sold in some markets as the Nissan Primastar)
- Kangoo (1997–present; developed by Renault and sold in some markets as the Mercedes-Benz Citan and the Nissan Townstar)
- Express (2021–present; developed by Renault, based on the Dacia Dokker, and sold in some markets as the Renault Nueva Kangoo and the Kangoo Express)

Dacia light commercial vehicles, sold in some markets under the Renault marque:

- Duster Commercial (2017–present)

=== Concept cars ===
Renault concept cars show future design and technology directions. Since 2008, Renault has displayed various all-electric car concepts under the name "Z.E.", for zero emission, starting with a concept based on the Renault Kangoo Be Bop. Further concepts and announcements followed, with the production of the Fluence Z.E. saloon beginning in 2011 and the Renault Zoe in 2012.

Renault revealed the Ondelios hybrid concept in 2008. but this was overtaken by the Z.E. programme. However, Renault presented a new hybrid car in September 2014, the Eolab, which incorporates various innovations that the company said will be added to production models by 2020.

In 2014 at the New Delhi Auto Show, Renault announced a new model, the Kwid Concept, which comes with helicopter drone.

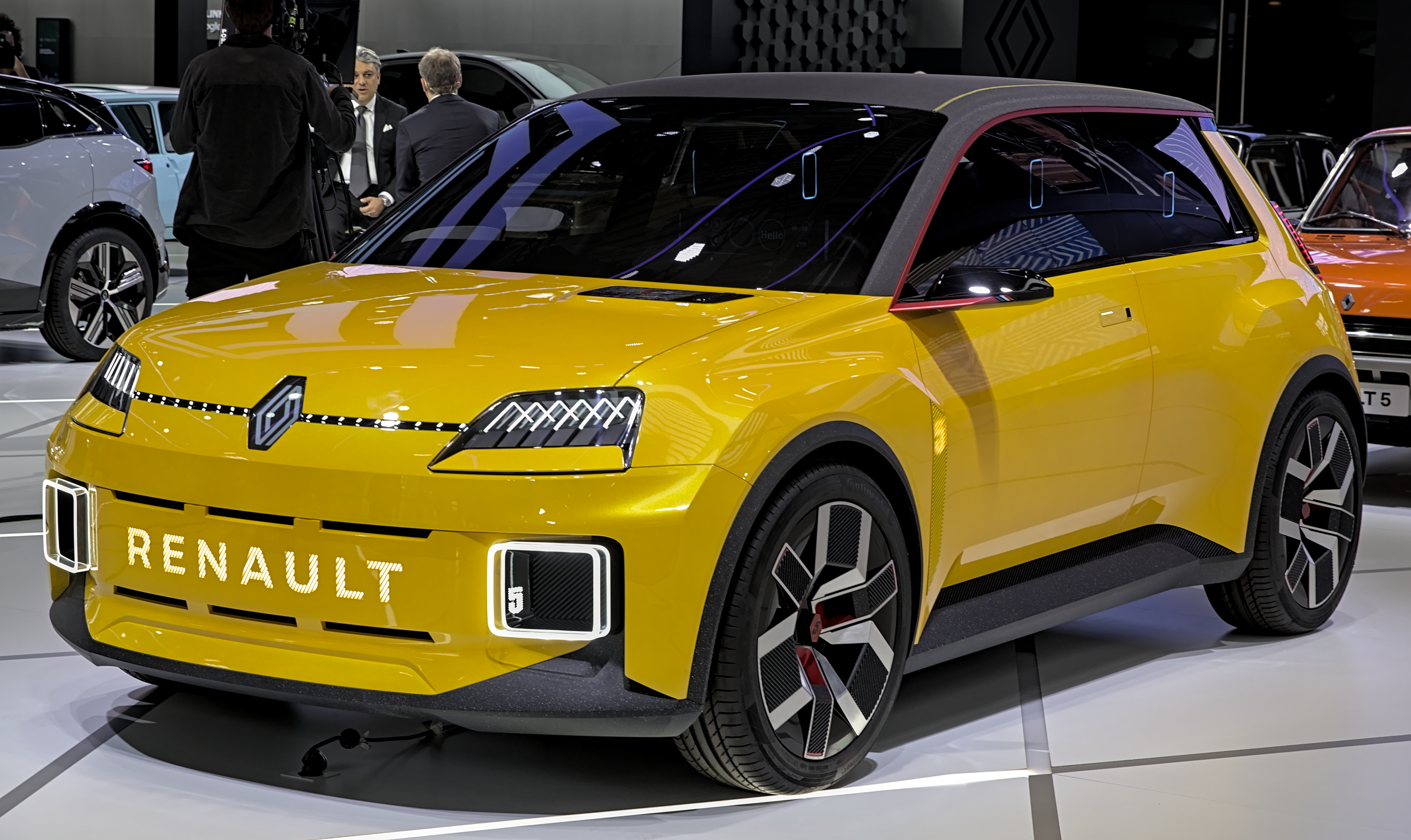
Renault 5 Prototype (2021)

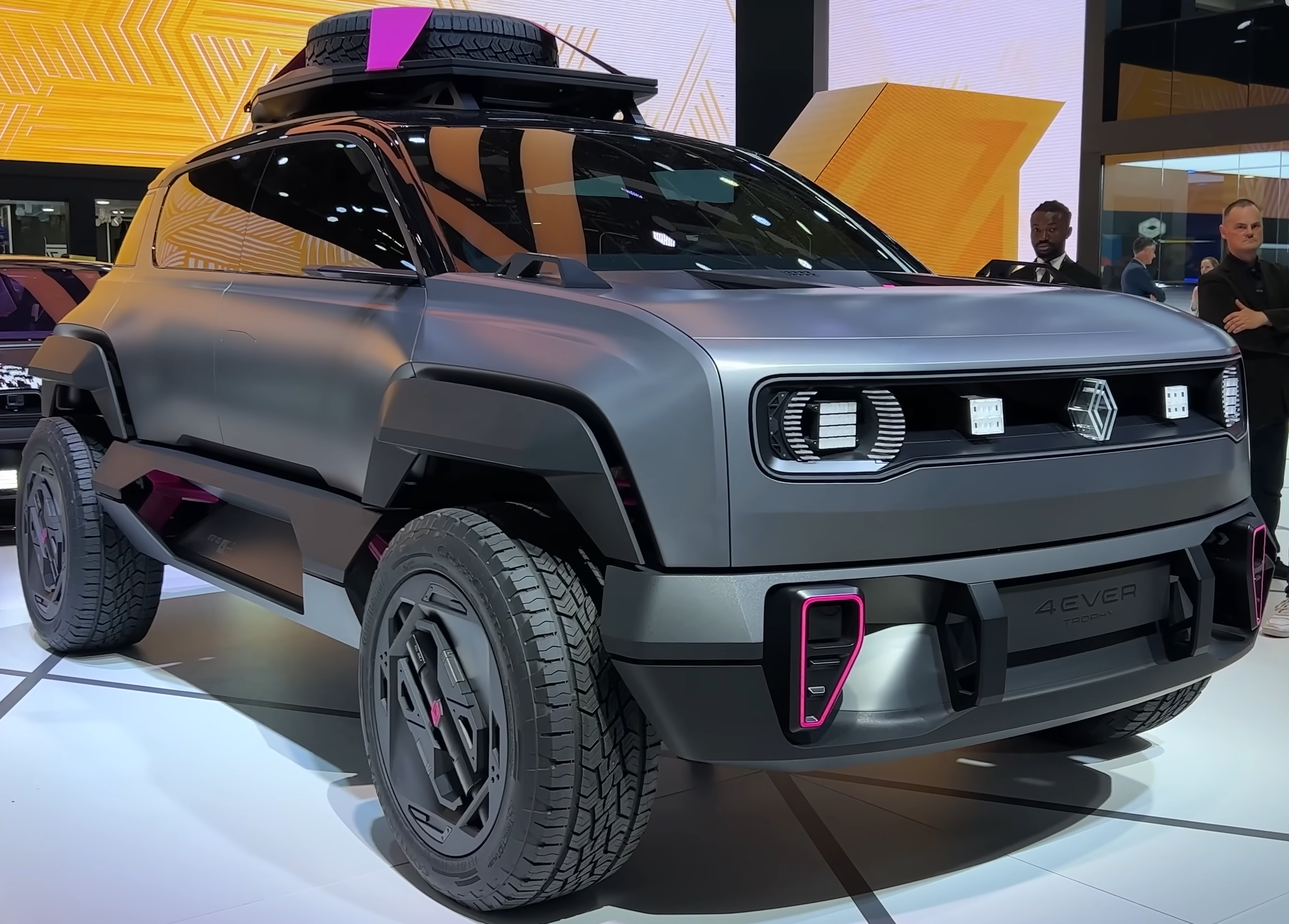
4ever Trophy (2022)

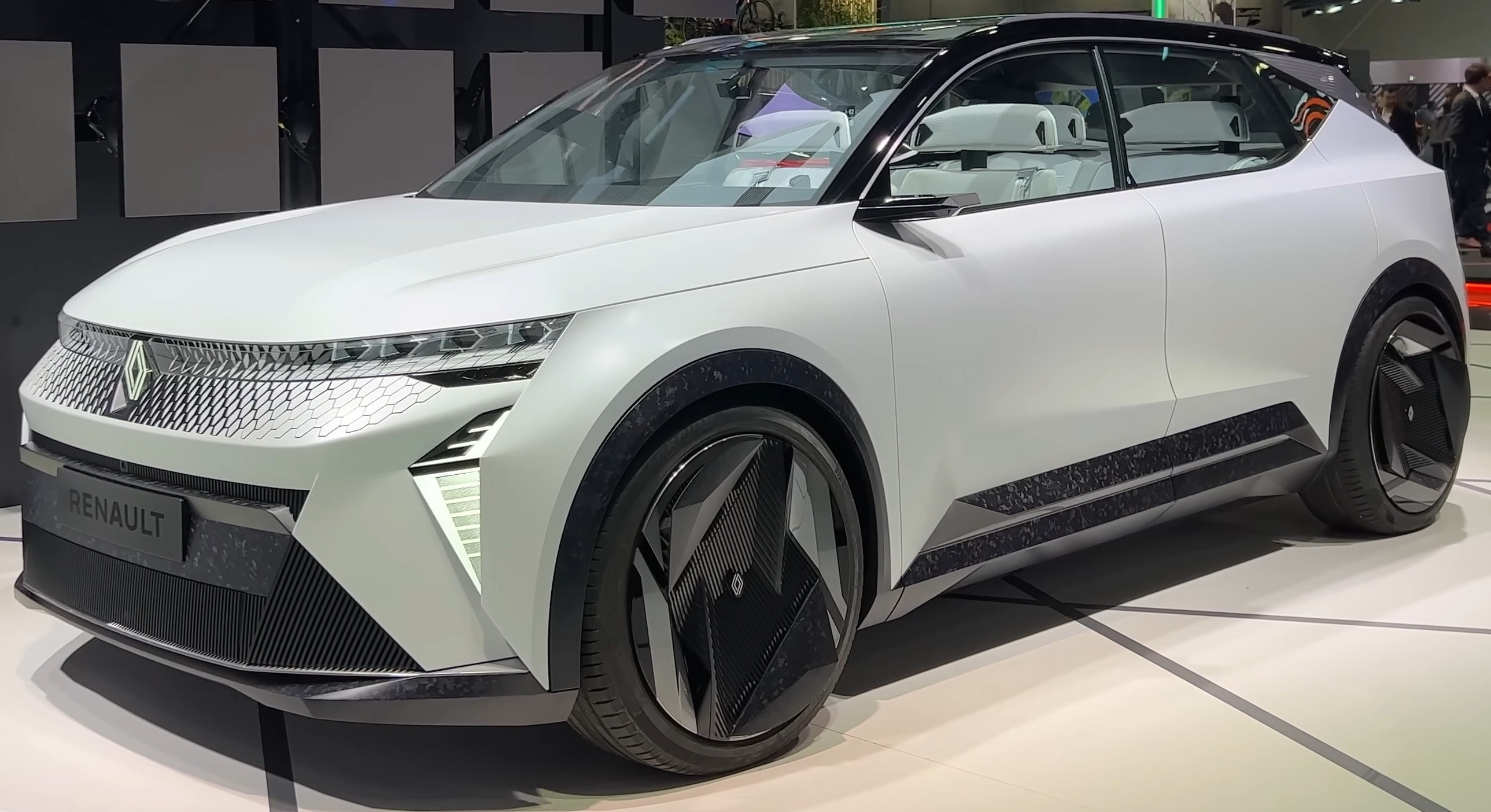
Scénic Vision (2022)

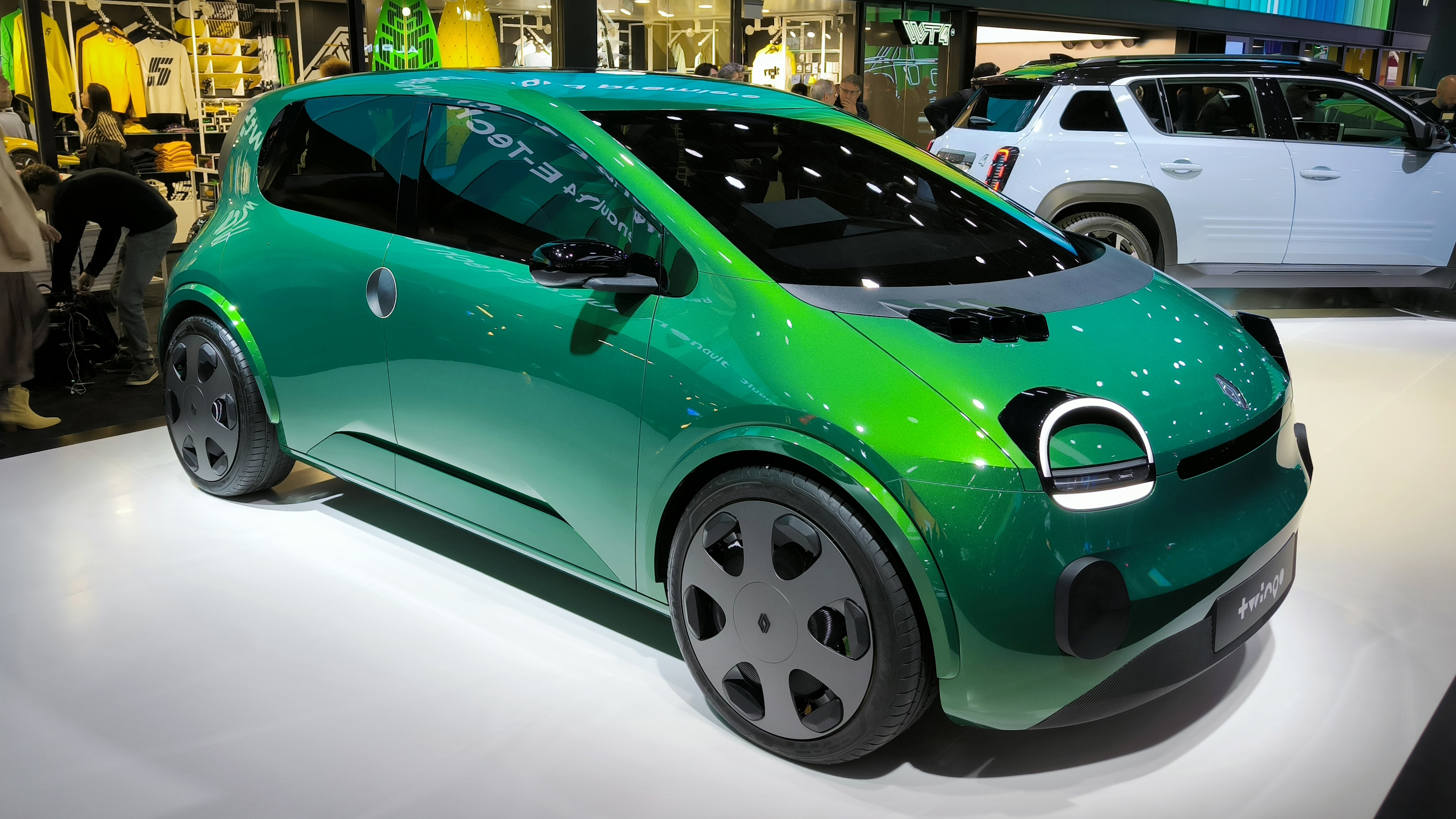
Twingo Legend (2023)

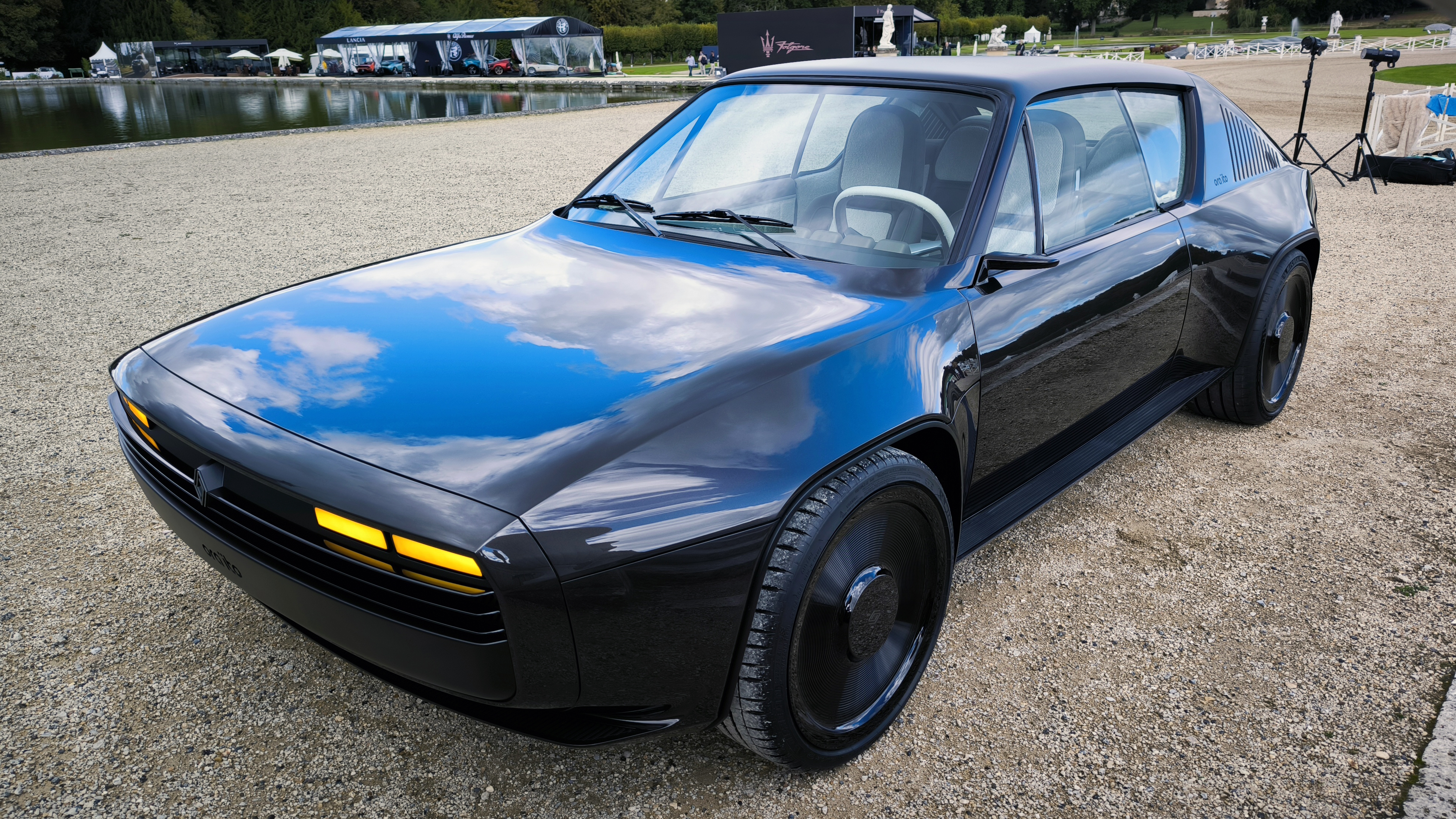
R17 Electric Restomod X ORA ÏTO (2024)

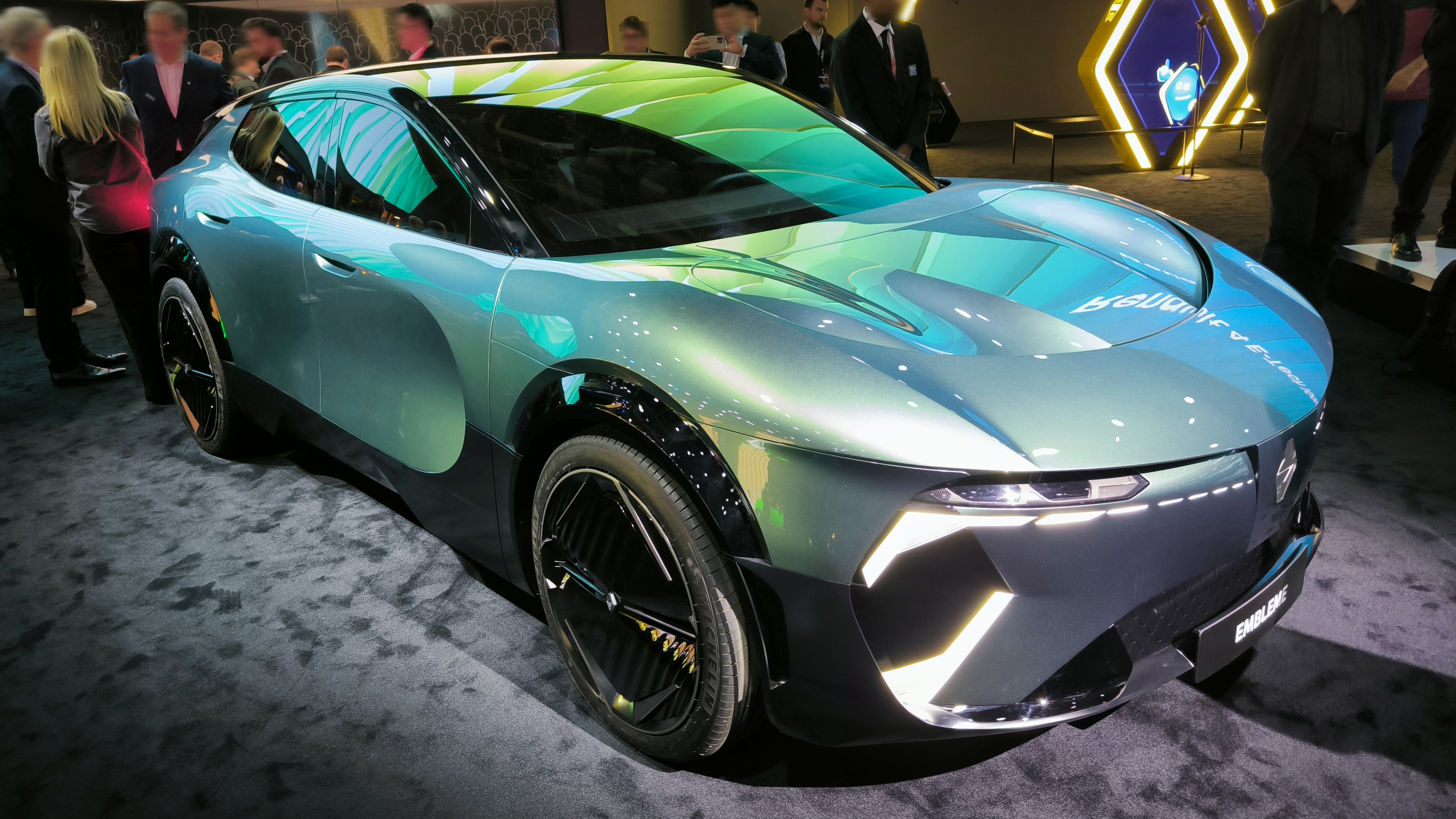
Emblème (2024)

=== Electric vehicles ===
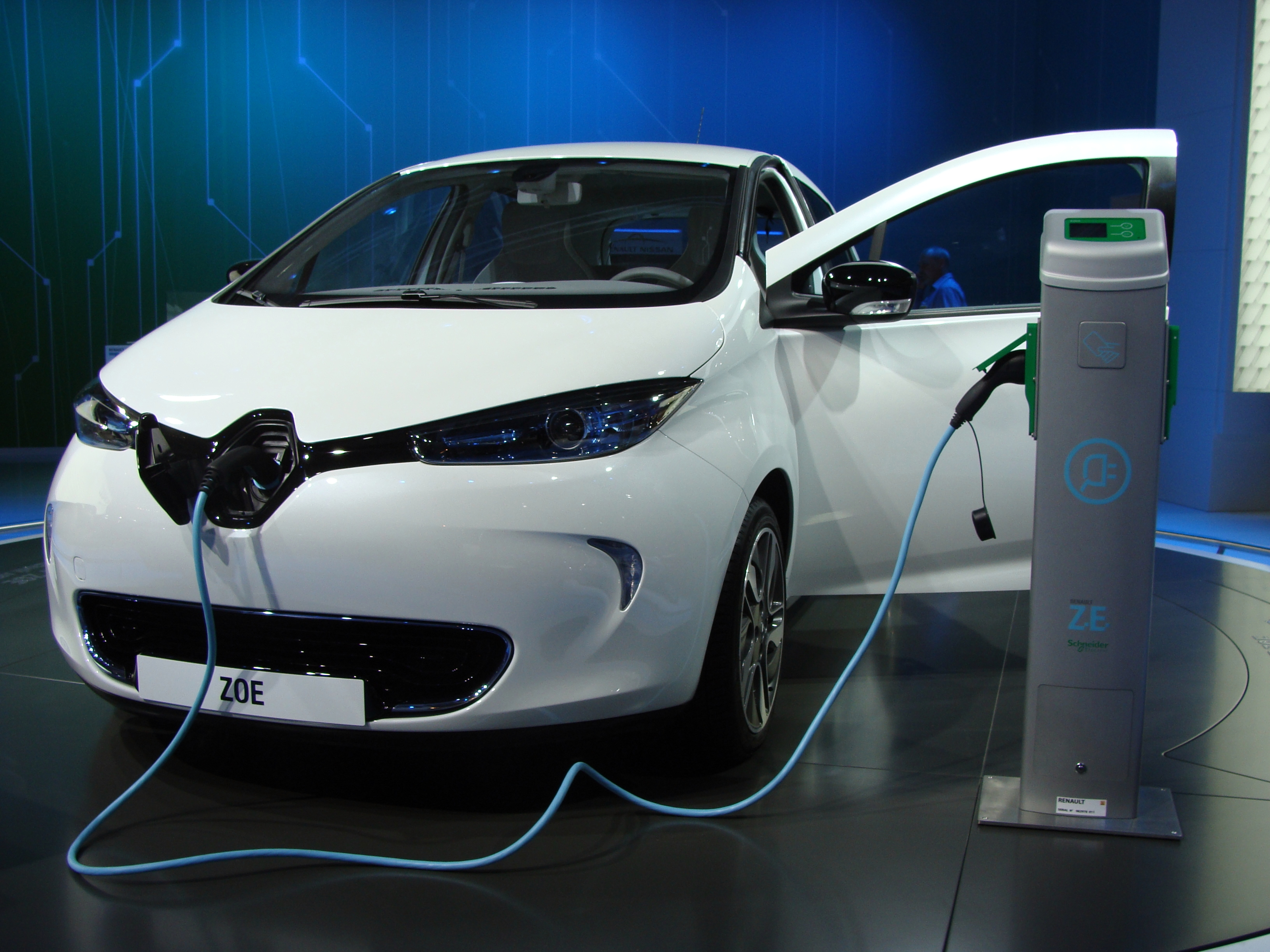
Renault Zoe, a pure electric car with a 210 km to 230 km range

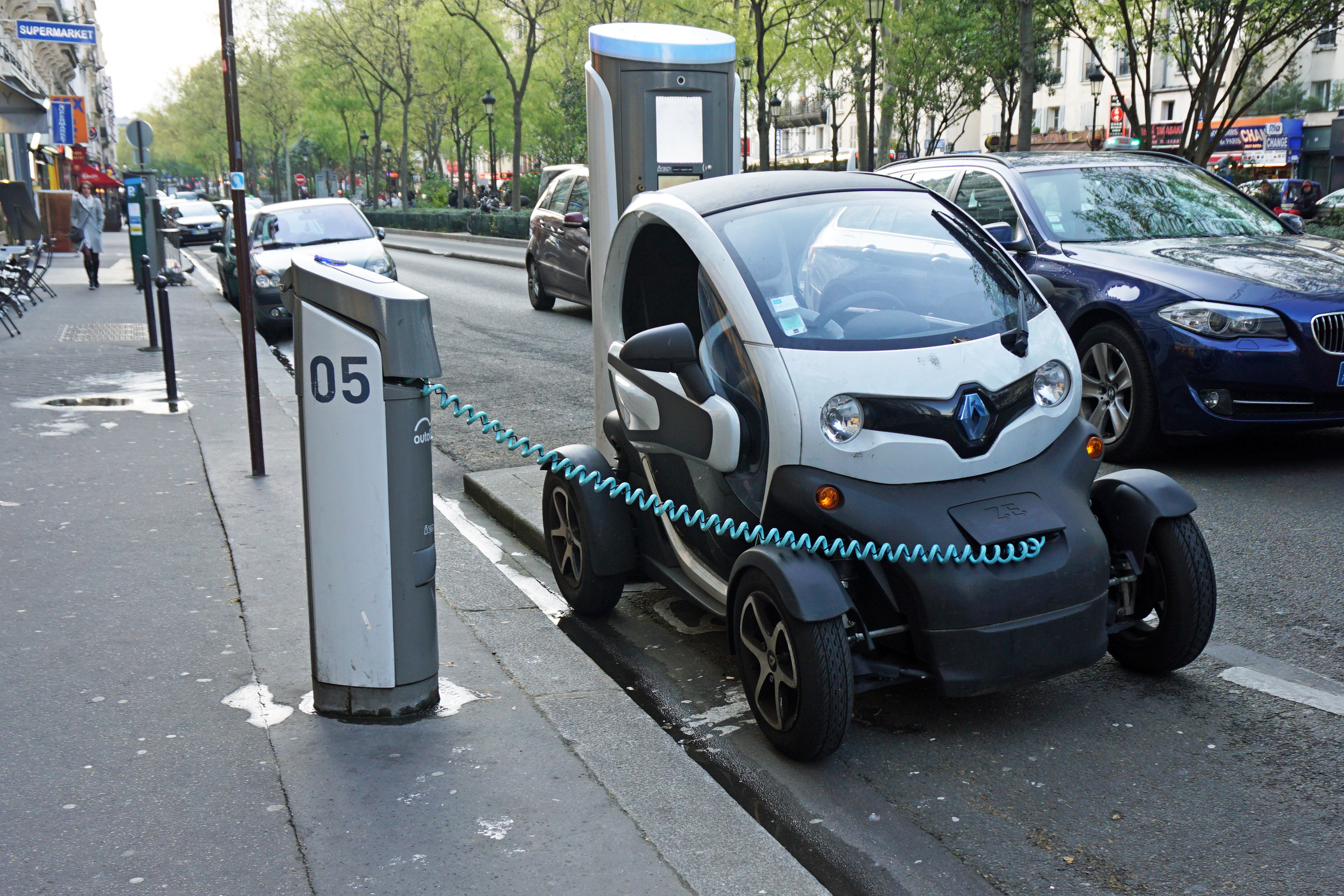
Renault Twizy all-electric heavy quadricycle

In 2013, Renault became the leader of electric vehicles sales in Europe, thanks to its large range of vehicles (Twizy, Zoe, Fluence, Kangoo). The Renault Zoe was Europe's best selling all-electric car in 2015 and 2016. Global Zoe sales reached the 50,000 unit mark in June 2016, and achieved the 150,000 unit milestone in June 2019. Groupe Renault global electric vehicle sales passed the 100,000 unit milestone in September 2016. Since the launch of the Renault electric program, the Group has sold more than 273,550 electric vehicles worldwide through December 2019. Since inception, a total of 181,893 Zoe city cars, 48,821 Kangoo Z.E. electric vans, 29,118 Twitzy heavy quadricycles, and 10,600 Fluence Z.E. cars have been sold globally through December 2019.

Beginning in 2008, Renault made agreements for its planned zero-emissions products, including with Israel, Portugal, Denmark and the US states of Tennessee and Oregon, Yokohama in Japan and the Principality of Monaco. Serge Yoccoz is the electric vehicle project director.

In 2008, Renault–Nissan signed a deal to produce electric cars for an initiative in Israel with Better Place, a US company developing new non-petroleum–based transport infrastructure. Renault aimed to sell 10–20,000 cars a year in Israel. Renault also agreed to develop exchangeable batteries for the project. Renault collaborated with Better Place to produce a network of all-electric vehicles and thousands of charging stations in Denmark, planned to be operational by 2011. The Renault Fluence Z.E., was selected for the Israel project. It became the first zero-emission vehicle with a switchable battery, with trials in 2010 undertaken with the Renault Laguna. Renault ended the partnership in 2013, following Better Place's bankruptcy, with only 1,000 vehicle sales in Israel and 240 in Denmark.

Renault–Nissan and the largest French electric utility, Électricité de France (EDF), signed an agreement to promote electric vehicles in France. The partnership planned to pilot projects on battery management and charging infrastructure. Renault–Nissan also signed deals with Ireland's Electricity Supply Board (ESB), and in Milton Keynes as part of the UK's Plugged in Places national project.

We have decided to introduce zero-emission vehicles as quickly as possible in order to ensure individual mobility against the background of high oil prices and better environmental protection

— Carlos Ghosn, CEO of Renault and Nissan

According to Ghosn, the Renault–Nissan alliance was a fundamental step in electric car development, and that they needed each other for other issues such as battery manufacturing, charging infrastructure and business strategy.

I don't think either Renault or Nissan would have been able to launch an EV alone successfully. You can have an electric car alone. But what you cannot have is an EV business system, from batteries to recycling to cars to infrastructure to negotiation, by being alone.

— Carlos Ghosn, CEO of Renault and Nissan

The Renault–Nissan group is a member of the PHEV Research Center. In September 2013, Renault and Bolloré announced an agreement to collaborate on a new electric vehicle and in car-sharing project.

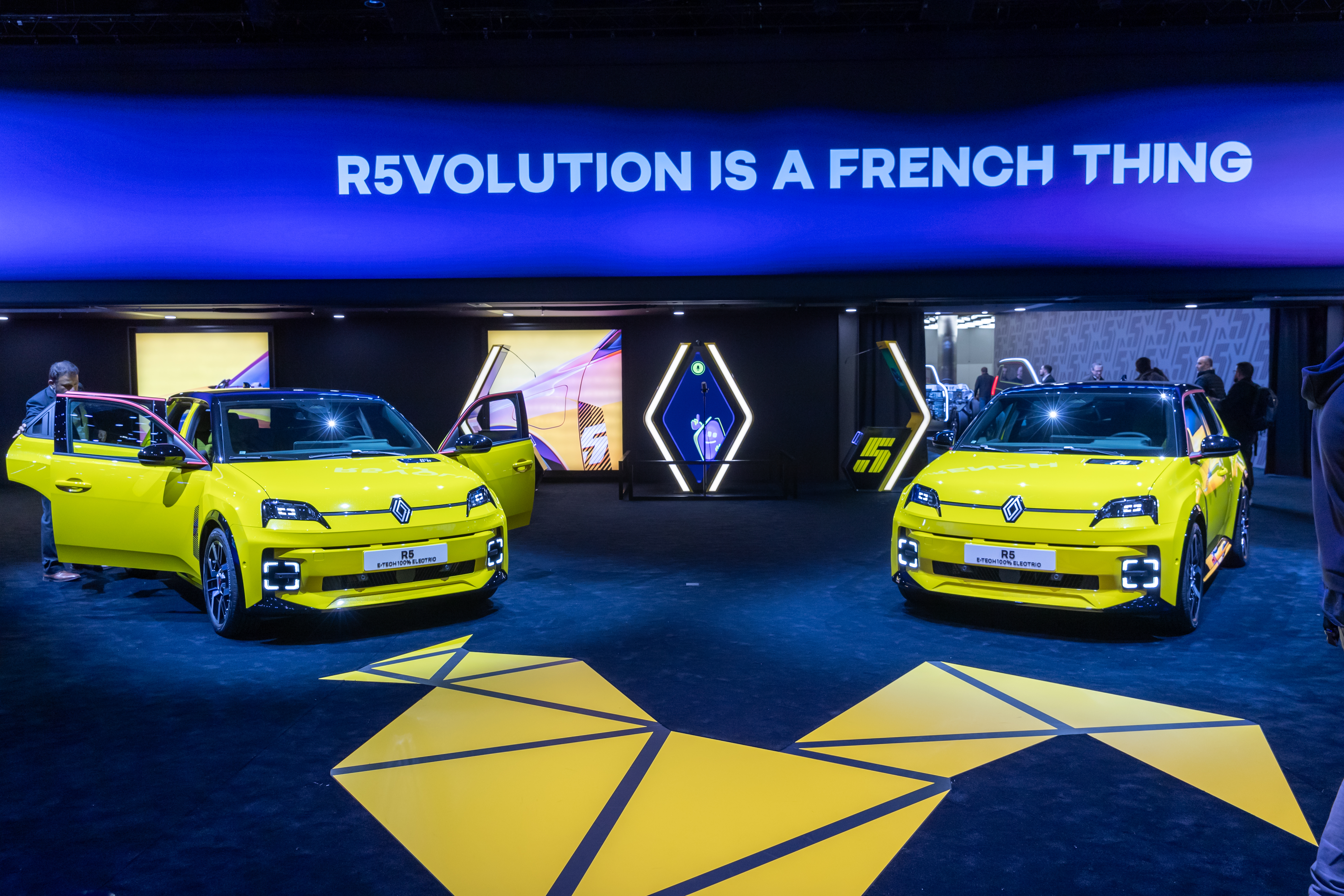
Launch event of the Renault 5 E-Tech at the 2024 Geneva International Motor Show

In 2021, Renault launched a new EV and mobility brand called Mobilize and showed a prototype for a small Twizy-style EV called the EZ-1. Renault Group also invested into a start-up company Verkor, that should develop EV batteries and about in 2026 build a gigafactory in France.

By 2025, the yearly output of 400,000 electric vehicles is planned.

=== Eco² ===
In 2007 Renault introduced a new line of eco-friendly derivatives marked eco² that were based on production platforms. A minimum of 5% recycled plastic was used and the vehicle's materials were 95% reusable. Eco²'s CO^{2} emissions were not to exceed 140g/km, or would be biofuel compatible. At the 2008 Fleet World Honours, Renault received the Environment Award. The chairman of Judges, George Emmerson, commented, "This was the most hotly contested category in the history of the Fleet World Honours, such is the clamour for organizations' green credentials to be recognised. There were some very impressive entries, but the panel felt that Renault's impressive range of low-emission vehicles was the most tangible, and the most quantifiable.

=== Autonomous vehicles ===
Renault plans to introduce autonomous vehicle technology by 2020. The company unveiled a prototype, the Next Two (based on the Zoe), in February 2014.

== Vehicle design ==
=== Design ===
==== "Pre-design" era ====
During its early years, Renault only manufactured the cars' chassis, while the bodywork was completed by coachbuilders. The first car with Renault's bodywork was the "Taxi de la Marne" introduced in 1905. Most Renault-made bodyworks were simple and utilitarian until the Reinastella unveiling in 1928. In the 1930s, Renault developed streamlined cars such as the Viva Grand Sport. In the 1950s, the company worked with Ghia designers.

==== Renault Styling ====
In 1961, with the assistance of the independent designer Philippe Charbonneaux (responsible for the R8), the company created Renault Styling as a design department, led by Gaston Juchet since 1963. In 1975, Robert Opron was named chief designer and Renault Styling was divided into Interior, Exterior and Advanced Design groups.

In the 1960s, an in-house computer-aided design (CAD) computer-aided manufacturing (CAM) system called UNISURF was introduced, led by Pierre Bézier (who popularised Bézier curves and worked at Renault from 1933 until 1975).

==== Industrial Design Department ====
In 1987, Renault named Patrick le Quément as chief designer and created the Industrial Design Department to replace Renault Styling. The new division incorporated a new management system, with more technology and personnel. Renault gave it the same importance as Engineering and Product Planning, participating in product development.

Le Quément was responsible for bold designs such as the Mégane II and the Vel Satis, giving Renault a more coherent and stylish image. In 1995, Design and Quality were merged under le Quément's direction. Later, the new department moved to Guyancourt's Technocentre, which also became the base for Engineering and Product Planning. The group was organised in three sections: Automobile Design; Truck, LCV and Bus Design; and Concept Cars and Advanced Design. During the next years, satellite centres opened in Spain (1999), Paris (2000), South Korea (2003), Romania (2007), India (2007), Brazil (2008) and China (2019).

At the end of 2009, le Quément was replaced by Laurens van den Acker, who introduced the "cycle of life" concept to Renault's design.

=== Engineering and Product Planning ===
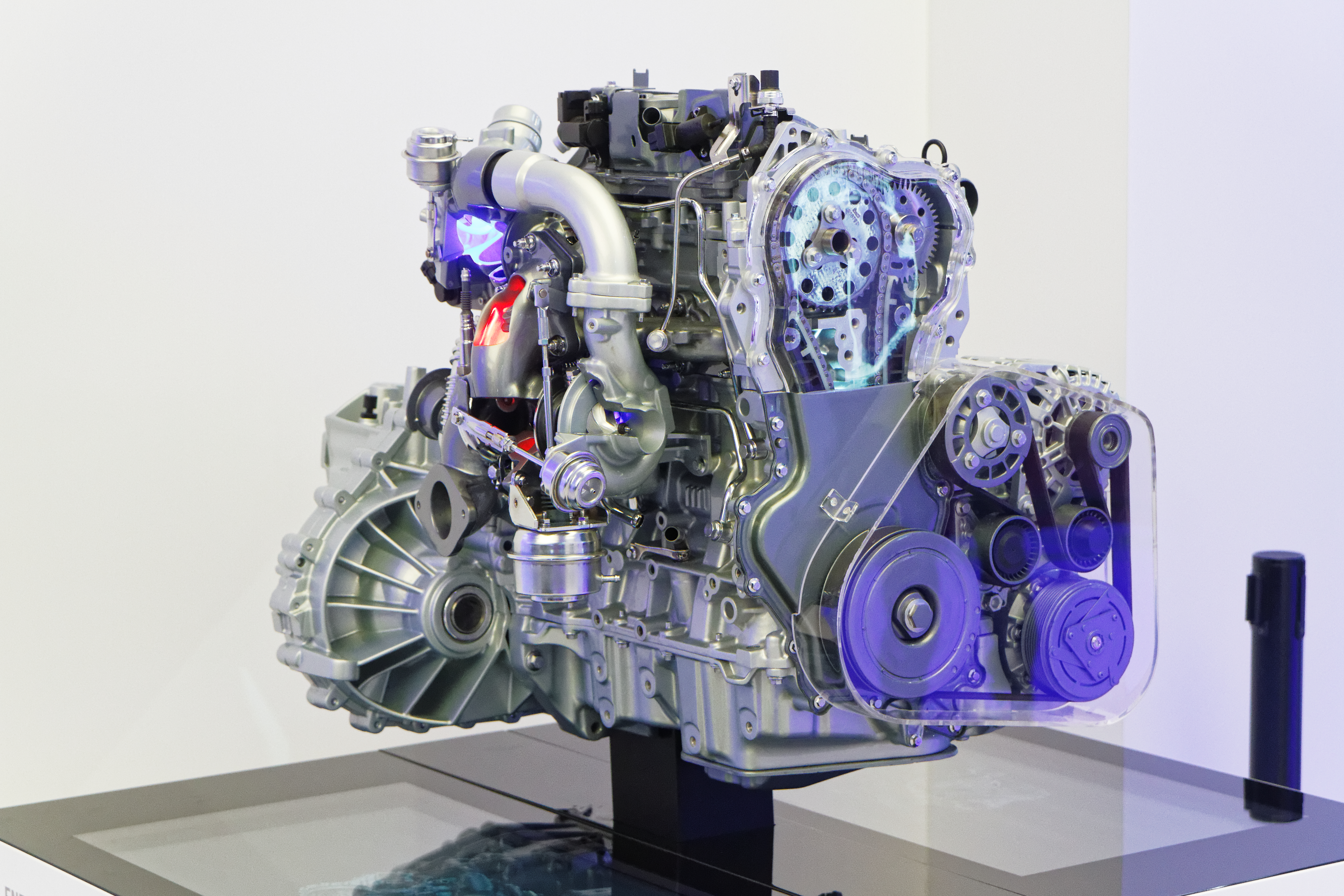
Renault twin-turbo engine

Most of Renault engineering was decentralised until 1998, when the Technocentre became the main Renault's engineering facility. Satellite centres exist, including Renault Technologies Americas (with branches in Argentina, Brazil, Chile, Colombia and Mexico), Renault Technologies Romania (branches in Morocco, Russia, Slovenia and Turkey) and Renault Technologies Spain (branch in Portugal). As of 2013, Renault's engineering section had over 6,500 employees worldwide, of which 34% were engineers and 63% technicians. Engine development is in charge of a specific division, Renault Powertrains, with nearly 65 engineers. Overseas engineering is increasing and research and design teams are in charge of adjusting existing vehicles to local needs and budgets.

As of 2014, Engineering, and Product Planning, are directed by Gaspar Gascon Abellan and Philippe Klein respectively.

=== Technocentre ===
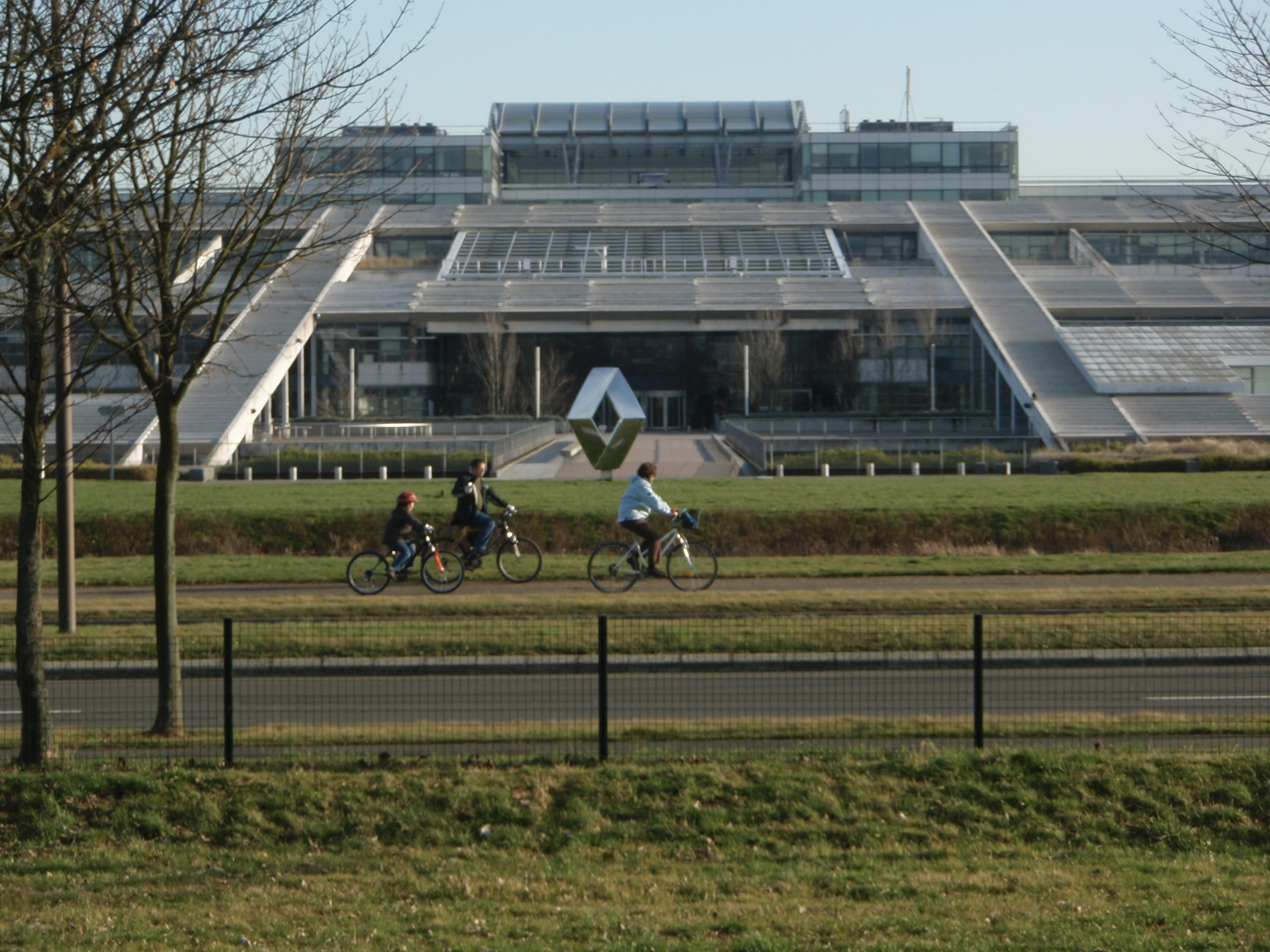
View of the Technocentre from the Jardin des Gogottes

The Renault Technocentre (French pronunciation: [ʁəno tɛknɔˈsɑ̃tʁ]) is the main research and development facility. It is located in Guyancourt. It covers 150 hectares (370 acres) and integrates all departments involved in developing products and industrial processes (design, engineering and product planning) as well as supplier representatives. The Technocentre gathers more than 8,000 employees and comprises three main sections: The Advance Precinct, The Hive and the prototype build centre. The Advance Precinct, a stepped structure surrounded by a lake, has design studios and other departments related to early design stages. The Hive is the tallest structure and includes research and engineering facilities dedicated to the development process of new vehicles. The prototype build centre is an extension of The Hive. The three main structures are accompanied by smaller technical buildings.

The Technocentre was one of the first enterprises to have real-time life-size 3D modelling systems.

=== Renault Tech ===
Renault Tech is a division of Renault Sport Technologies, headquartered in Les Ulis. It was established in 2008 and is in charge of modifying cars and vans for special purposes (mobility cars, driver's school cars, and business fleets).

== Subsidiaries and alliances ==
=== Subsidiaries ===
==== Regional marques ====
===== Dacia =====
In 1999, Renault acquired a 51% controlling stake from the Romanian-based manufacturer Automobile Dacia, which was later increased to 99.43%. As part of the Renault group, Dacia is a regional marque of entry-levels cars focused on Europe and Northern Africa which shares various models with the Renault marque.

==== RCI Banque ====
RCI Banque is a wholly owned subsidiary that provides financial services for Renault marques worldwide and Nissan marques in Europe, Russia and South America.

==== Renault Retail Group ====
Renault Retail Group is Renault's wholly owned automobile distributor for Europe. In 1997, the French branches were merged to establish the subsidiary Renault France Automobiles (RFA). In 2001, it served as the basis for Renault Europe Automobiles (REA), which managed sales in Europe. In 2008, the company adopted its current name. Renault Retail Group operates in France, Austria, Belgium, the Czech Republic, Germany, Italy, Luxembourg, Poland, Portugal, Spain, Switzerland, and the United Kingdom.

==== Manufacturing subsidiaries ====
===== French factories =====
- Batilly, subsidiary Société de Véhicules Automobiles de Batilly (SoVAB)
- ElectriCity
  - Cléon
  - Douai
  - Maubeuge, subsidiary Maubeuge Construction Automobile (MCA).
  - Ruitz, subsidiary Société des Transmissions Automatiques (STA) owned by Renault
- Dieppe, Société des Automobiles Alpine
- Flins
- Auto Châssis International (ACI)
  - Le Mans
  - Villeurbanne
  - Meyzieu
- Sandouville

===== Manufacturing subsidiaries outside France =====
- Cacia (Portugal)
- Cormecánica S.A. (Chile)
- JMEV (China), a joint venture majority owned by Renault and with JMCG as the second largest shareholder
- Oyak-Renault (Turkey), a joint venture between Renault and Oyak (Turkey's Armed Forces Pension Fund), established in 1969
- Renault Algérie (Algeria), a joint venture between SNVI (51%) and Renault (49%), established in 2013
- Renault Argentina (Argentina)
- Renault Brilliance Jinbei (China), a joint venture between Renault and Brilliance Auto, established in 2017
- Renault do Brasil (Brazil)
- Renault España (Spain)
- Renault India (India)
- Renault Industrie Belgique S.A./Renault Industrie België N.V. (Belgium)
- Renault Korea (South Korea), a Renault acquired car division of Samsung on 1 September 2000 in a $560 million deal for 70%, eventually increasing its stake to 80.1%. The majority of the company's (renamed as Renault Samsung Motors) production at its Busan plant is exported under the Renault badge. In April 2024, after being renamed Renault Korea Motors and then Renault Korea, the company unified its marketing with the Renault marque and became an assembly subsidiary.
- Renault Tanger Méditerranée (Morocco), a subsidiary operating the Renault-Nissan Alliance factory in Tangier
- Renault México (Mexico, cars manufactured in Nissan's Aguascalientes plant since 2013)
- Renault Pars (Iran), a joint venture established in 2004 and owned by Renault (51%) and Iran's Industrial Development Renovation Organisation (IDRO) (49%)
- Renault South Africa (South Africa, cars manufactured in the Nissan's Rosslyn plant)
- Revoz (Slovenia)
- Sofasa (Colombia)
- Somaca (Morocco)

=== Alliances ===
==== Renault–Nissan–Mitsubishi ====
For many years, Renault had a 43.4% stake in Nissan, thereby giving it effective control de jure, and Nissan held a 15% stake (with no voting rights) in Renault. As of November 2023 Renault owns 15% shares with voting rights. It has more shares in a French trust which it can use for voting in a few limited situations.

As well as sharing engines and joint-development of zero-emissions technology, Nissan increased its presence in Europe by badging various Renault van models such as the Renault Kangoo/Nissan Kubistar, Renault Master/Nissan Interstar and the Renault Trafic/Nissan Primastar. Some passenger cars have also been badge-engineered, such as the Renault Clio-based Nissan Platina in Brazil. The "Renault Production System" standard used by all Renault factories borrowed extensively from the "Nissan Production Way" and resulted in Renault productivity improving by 15%. The alliance led to the loss of 21,000 jobs, and the closure of three assembly and two powertrain plants.

In March 2010 the Renault-Nissan alliance opened its first joint facility in Chennai, India, investing 45 billion rupees (US$991.1 million). The facility builds the Nissan Micra. The Renault Fluence and Renault Koleos are intended to be assembled there from completely knocked-down units. As a result of opening its own factory, Renault ended its five-year Mahindra Renault joint venture with Mahindra & Mahindra company to make and sell the Renault Logan in India.

==== Renault–Nissan–Mitsubishi and Daimler alliance ====
On 7 April 2010 Ghosn and Daimler AG CEO Dieter Zetsche announced a partnership between the three companies. Daimler acquired a 3.10 per cent stake in Renault-Nissan and Renault and Nissan each took a 1.55 per cent stake in Daimler.

==== Geely alliance ====
In January 2022, Renault and Chinese manufacturer Geely signed an agreement by which Renault's South Korean subsidiary, Renault Korea, would produce vehicles based on Geely Compact Modular Architecture platform, initially intended for the domestic market. In December 2022, Geely acquired a 34% stake of Renault Korea through capital increase as part of their partnership, although the company would continue to be majority owned by Renault and a consolidated subsidiary of it.

In May 2024, Renault and Geely established a joint venture holding aimed at producing powertrains, including internal combustion engines (ICE) and hybrid systems. The venture dates back to an agreement between the two companies in November 2022. Both Geely and Renault were set to transfer their intellectual property for ICEs and hybrid systems to the venture holding, and plans to supply engines to Dacia (part of Renault Group), Volvo, Lynk & Co, Proton (part of Geely) as well as Nissan and Mitsubishi Motors from the Renault–Nissan–Mitsubishi Alliance.

In June 2025, Renault, Geely Auto and Geely Holding announced to establish a joint venture to manufacture electric vehicle in Brazil. The JV company would be owned 73.57% by Renault, 21.29% by Geely Auto, 5.11% by Geely Holding, and 0.03% by an independent third party. The company would produce and distribute vehicles under the Renault and Geely brands in Brazil, with shared distribution infrastructure and a nationwide dealer network.

==== American Motors ====
In 1979, Renault entered into an agreement with American Motors Corporation (AMC) to sell cars in the US. A year later, Renault acquired a 22.5% interest in AMC. This was not the first time the two companies had worked together. In the early 1960s, Renault assembled CKD kits and marketed Ramblers in France. In 1982, Renault increased its stake in AMC to 46.4%. The Renault Alliance/Encore (a modified version of the Renault 9 and 11) entered production in the US, but following AMC's continued decline, Renault withdrew from the US in 1987 and sold its share to Chrysler.

==== Proposed alliances ====
On 30 June 2006, the media reported that General Motors convened an emergency board meeting to discuss a proposal by shareholder Kirk Kerkorian to form an alliance with Renault-Nissan. However, GM CEO Richard Wagoner felt that an alliance would disproportionately benefit Renault's shareholders and that GM should receive compensation accordingly. Talks between GM and Renault ended on 4 October 2006.

In 2007, Renault-Nissan entered talks with Indian manufacturer Bajaj Auto to develop a new ultra-low-cost car along the lines of the Tata Nano. Renault's existing partner in India, Mahindra, was not interested in the project. The proposed joint venture did not come to fruition and in late 2009 the companies announced that Bajaj would develop and manufacturer the vehicle and supply Renault-Nissan with completed cars.

On 7 October 2008 a Renault executive said the company was interested in acquiring or partnering with Chrysler. On 11 October 2008, The New York Times reported that General Motors, Nissan and Renault had all been in discussions over the past month with Chrysler's owner Cerberus Capital Management about acquiring Chrysler.

In May 2019, Fiat Chrysler Automobiles proposed merging its business with Renault. The proposal was later withdrawn.

== Awards ==
Renault models have won the European Car of the Year award eight times :

- 1966: Renault 16
- 1982: Renault 9
- 1991: Renault Clio
- 1997: Renault Scénic
- 2003: Renault Mégane II
- 2006: Renault Clio III
- 2024: Renault Scenic E-Tech
- 2025: Renault 5 E-Tech

Renault cars have won numerous national-level awards in Spain, Australia, Ireland, the United States, Denmark, and elsewhere. Renault and its Dacia subsidiary have won three "Autobest" car of the year awards for the Duster, Logan, and Symbol models.

Under the patronage of the Italian Ministry of Culture, in the 2016 edition of the Corporate Art Awards Renault received by pptArt the award for its Art Collection that inspired the creativity of its car designers.

== Marketing and branding ==
Renault markets its products under the marques Renault, Dacia and Alpine. Renault founded in 2021 the Mobilize brand, which started in 2024 with the marketing of electric mobility services and vehicles.

=== Renault badge ===
Renault's first badge was introduced in 1900 and consisted of the Renault brothers' intertwined initials. When the company started mass production in 1906, it adopted a gear-shaped logo with a car inside it. After World War I the company used a logo depicting an FT tank. In 1923 it introduced a new circle-shaped badge, which was replaced by the "diamond" or lozenge in 1925. The lozenge of Renault means a diamond that expresses the brand's firm desire to project a strong and consistent corporate image.

The Renault diamond logo has been through many iterations. To modernise its image, Renault asked Victor Vasarely to design its new logo in 1972. The transformed logo maintained the diamond shape. The design was later revised to reflect the more rounded lines of the brand's new styling cues. The current badge has been in use since 1992.

The logo for web and print use was updated three times thereafter. In 2002 a more realistic representation inside a yellow rectangle was made which is still used as the Renault Trucks logo albeit in red. In 2004 the logo received the Renault Identité typeface. In 2007, Saguez & Partners produced a version with the wordmark and logo inside a square.

In April 2015, Renault introduced new designs to differentiate the company from the product brand, as part of the 'Passion for life' campaign. The new brand logo replaced the yellow background with a yellow stripe. A new typeface was also introduced. A corporate logo was unveiled at the 2015 Annual General Meeting, incorporating Renault, Dacia and Renault Samsung Motors.

January 2021 saw the introduction of a new flat diamond logo alongside the Renault 5 Prototype electric concept car. The logo received so much positive feedback that Renault officially introduced the new symbol as its logo in March 2021, according to Renault's design director Gilles Vidal, who joined the group in 2020. They plan to introduce the new diamond on many online platforms in June 2021 and the first model with the new logo featured will be revealed in 2022.

The yellow associated with the company appeared initially in the diamond badge of 1946, when Renault was nationalised.

Logo of Renault from 1923 to 1925

Logo of Renault from 1925 to 1946

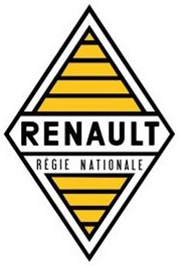
Logo of Renault from 1946 to 1959

Logo of Renault from 1958 to 1967

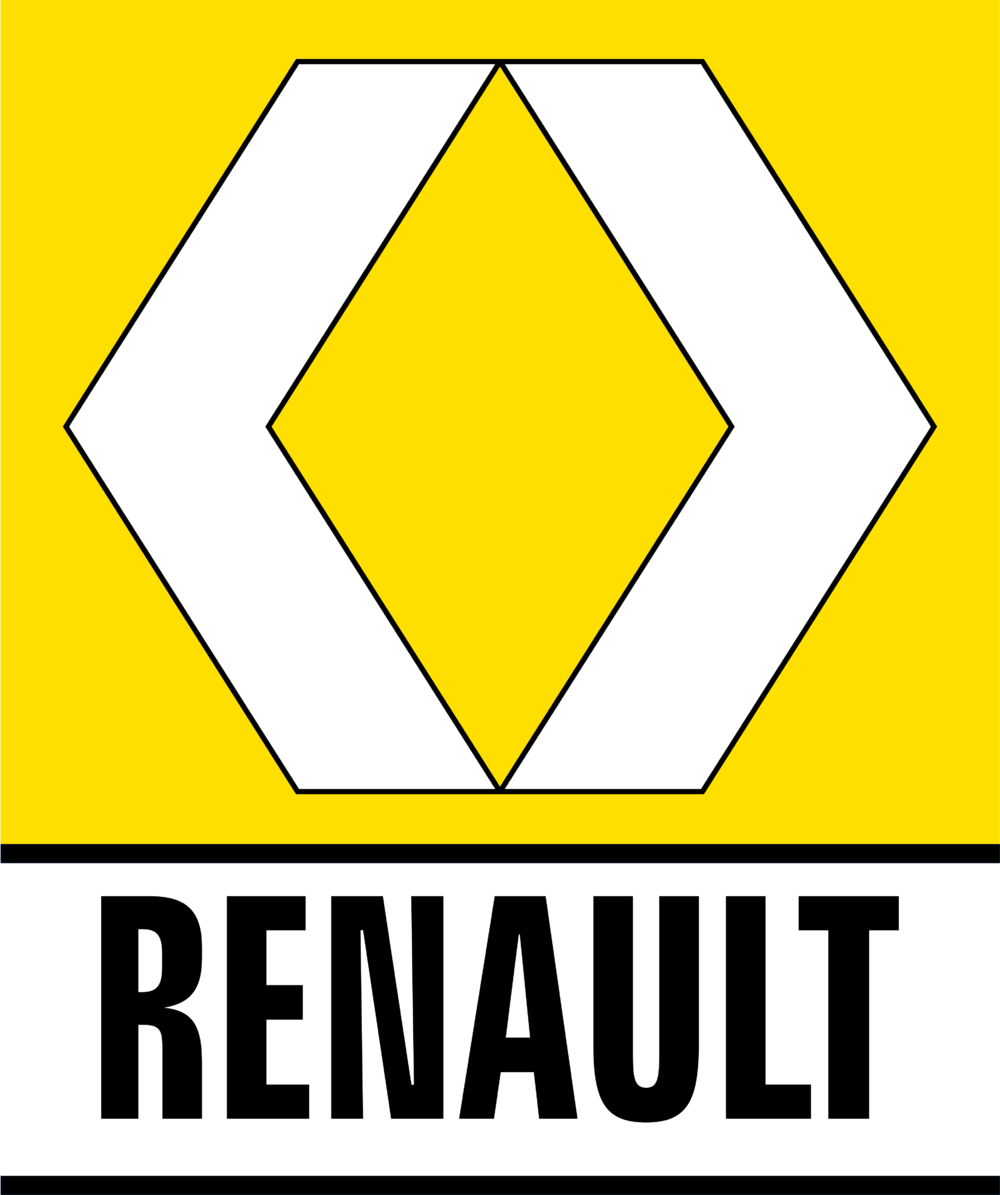
Logo of Renault from 1967 to 1972 (This logo was not used because it is considered as a copy of the logo of the company Kent)

Logo of Renault from 1973 to 1982 (Vasarely Logo)

Logo of Renault from 1982 to 1990

Logo of Renault from 1990 to 2004

Logo of Renault from 2004 to 2007

Logo of Renault from 2015 to 2021 (still used as a badge)

Logo of Renault since 2021

Groupe Renault logo up to 2021 (as distinct from the Renault diamond used for the brand)

Renault Group logo from 2021 onwards

=== Typeface ===
==== Renault MN ====
Both the Renault logo and its documentation (technical as well as commercial) historically used Renault MN, a custom typeface developed by British firm Wolff Olins. This type of family is said to have been designed mainly to save costs at a time when the use of typefaces was costly.

A retail version of the font family was sold by URW++ as Renault.

==== Renault Identité ====
In 2004, French typeface designer Jean-François Porchez was commissioned to design a replacement. This was shown in October of that year and was called Renault Identité. The OpenType font family was developed from the Renault logotype created by Éric de Berranger.

==== Helvetica ====
Since 2007, as part of the Saguez & Partners revamp, all graphic advertising makes use of Helvetica Neue Condensed.

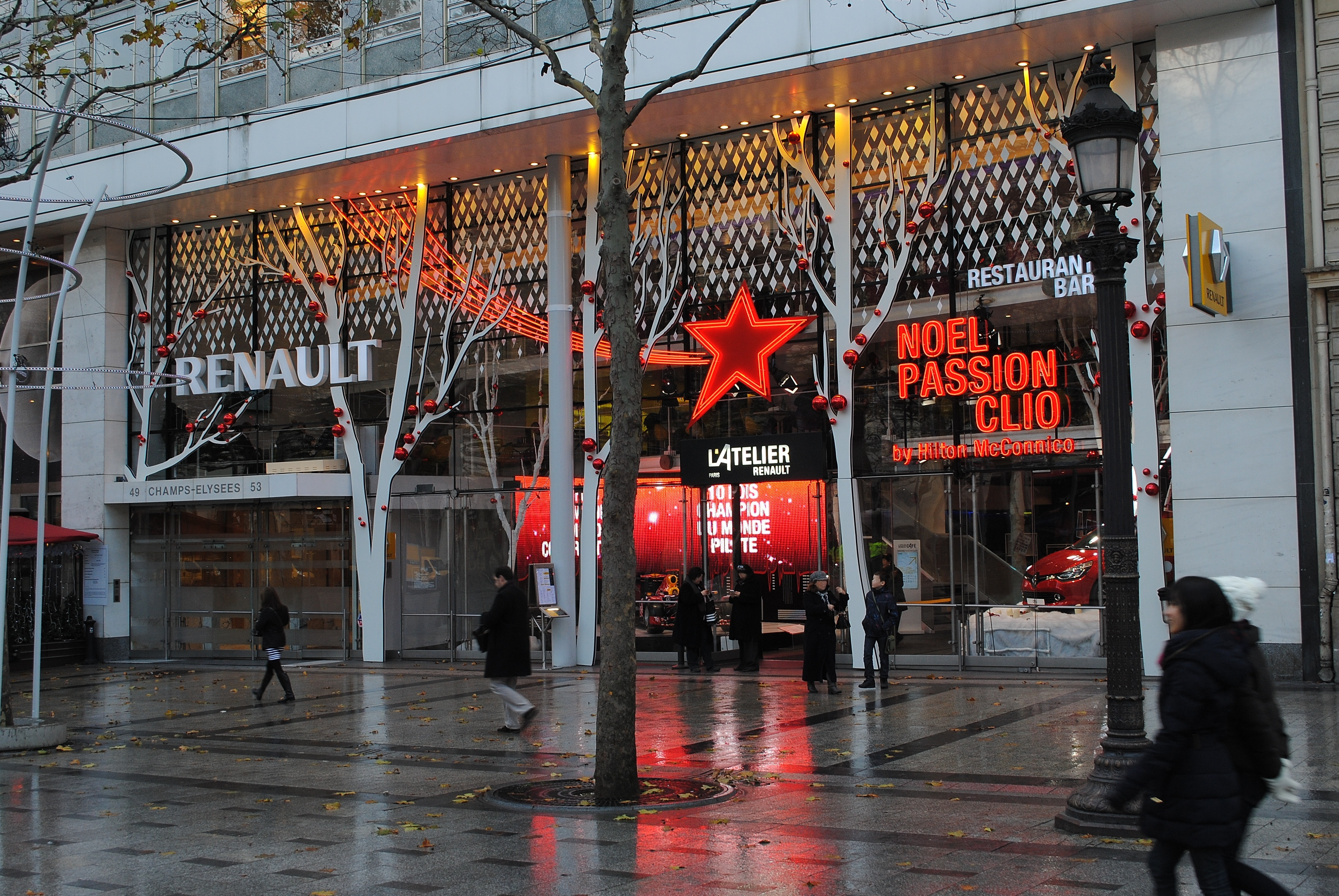
L'Atelier Renault in Paris, a cultural place, gastronomy restaurant and car showroom

==== Renault Life ====
The Renault Life font family was built by Fontsmith Limited, based on the foundry's FS Hackney font family.

The family consists of six fonts in three weights (Life, Regular, and Bold) and one width, with complimentary italic.

=== L'Atelier Renault Paris ===
Renault's flagship showroom, L'Atelier Renault (French pronunciation: [latəlje ʁəno]), is located on the Champs-Élysées in Paris, with other manufacturers such as Peugeot, Citroën and Toyota. It opened in November 2000, located on the site of Pub Renault, which operated from 1963 until 1999. The first Renault venue at the location was the Magasin Renault in 1910, a pioneering car showroom.

L'Atelier features a Renault Boutique as well as regular exhibitions featuring Renault and Dacia cars. An upmarket restaurant is located on the second floor, looking out onto the Champs-Élysées. The ground floor can hold up to five exhibitions at any one time. As of March 2009, 20 million visitors had visited L'Atelier Renault.

=== Renault Classic ===
Renault Classic is a department within Renault that seeks to collect, preserve and exhibit notable vehicles from the company's history. Originally named Histoire & Collection, the collection was assembled in 2002 and its workshops formally opened on 24 April 2003.

=== Music ===
Throughout the 1980s and 1990s, Renault's European advertising made extensive use of Robert Palmer's song "Johnny and Mary". Television advertisements initially used Palmer's original version, while a range of special recordings in different styles were produced during the 1990s, most famously the acoustic interpretation by Martin Taylor that he released on his album Spirit of Django.

=== Sponsorship ===
Renault has sponsored films as an advertising technique since 1899. A Renault Voiturette Type A, driven by Louis Renault, appeared in one of the Lumières' early films. Between 1914 and 1940, the company commissioned a series of documentary films to promote its industrial activities. Renault also backed some films set in Africa during the 1920s to promote the reliability of its products on tough conditions. Since 1983, the company sponsors the Cannes Film Festival and it has also sponsored other festivals as the Venice Film Festival, the Marrakech Film Festival and the BFI London Film Festival.

Through its foundations and institutes, Renault funds projects around the world that focus on: education through scholarships, road safety and diversity.

== See also ==
- Tanks in France
