= Renault 4CV =

Rear-engined, rear-wheel-drive, small 4-door car

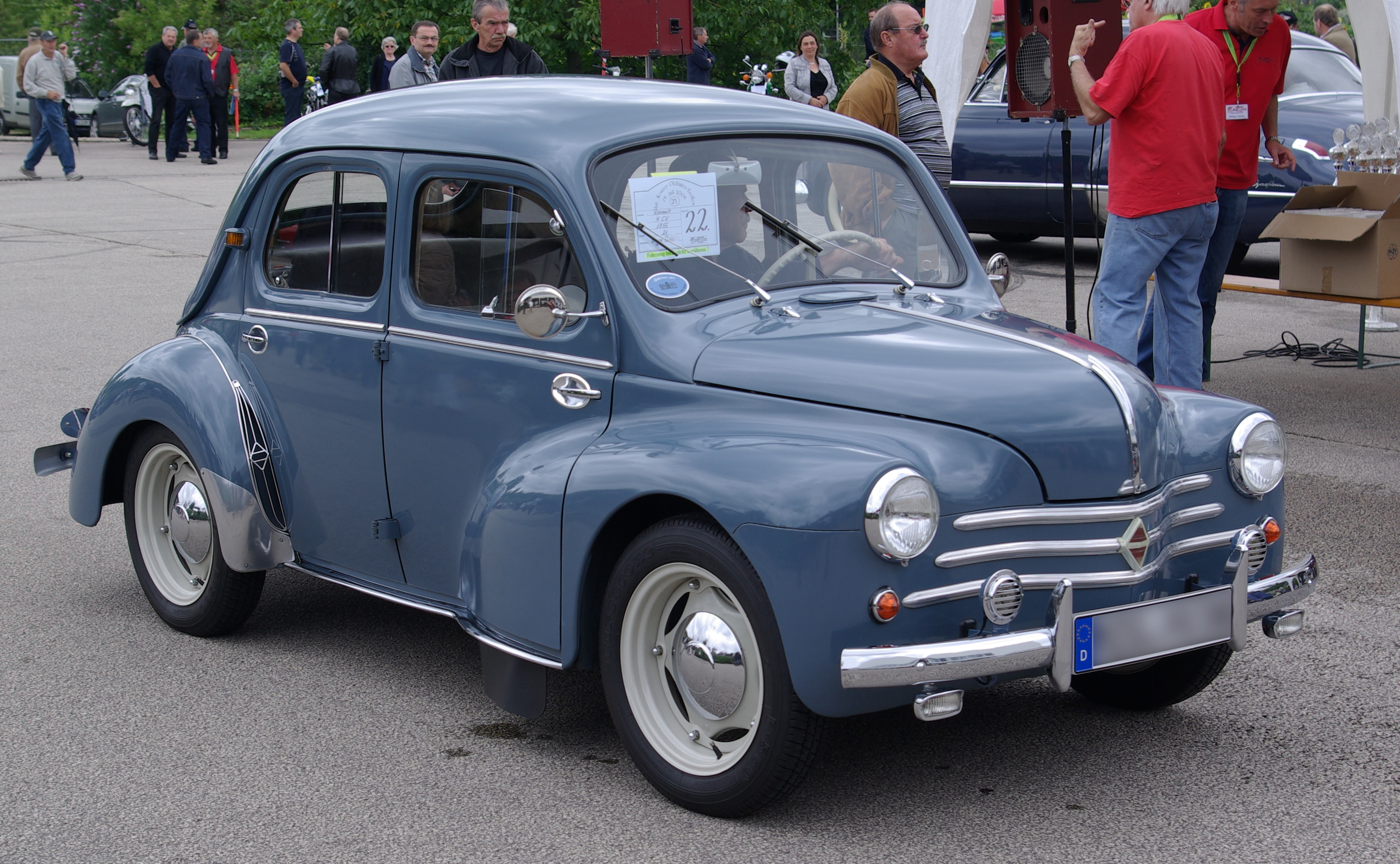

Overview
- Manufacturer: Renault
- Also called: Hino 4CV (Japan); Renault 4/4; Renault 760 (Australia); Renault 750 (Australia); Renault Quintette
- Production: August 1947 – July 1961; 1,105,543 produced
- Assembly: France: Billancourt; Australia: Sydney; Belgium: Haren-Vilvoorde (RIB); Ireland: Dublin; Israel: Nesher (Kaiser-Frazer); Japan: Hino-shi (Hino Motors); Spain: Valladolid (FASA-Renault); United Kingdom: Acton
- Designer: Fernand Picard

Body and chassis
- Class: Small car (B)
- Body style: 4-door saloon 4-door cabriolet 4-door panel van
- Layout: RR layout

Powertrain
- Engine: 747 cc Billancourt I4; 760 cc Billancourt I4
- Transmission: 3-speed manual

Dimensions
- Length: 3,663 mm (144.2 in)
- Width: 1,430 mm (56.3 in)
- Height: 1,470 mm (57.9 in)
- Curb weight: 620 kg (1,367 lb)

Chronology
- Predecessor: Renault Juvaquatre
- Successor: Renault Dauphine; Renault 4

The Renault 4CV (French: quatre chevaux, pronounced [kat.ʃəvo] as if spelled quat'chevaux) is a car produced by the French company Renault from August 1947 through July 1961. It is a four-door economy car with its engine mounted in the rear and driving the rear wheels. It was the first French car to sell over a million units, and was superseded by the Dauphine.

The 4CV was of monocoque construction, 3.6 m (11 ft 10 in) in length with front suicide doors.

CV is the abbreviation of chevaux-vapeur, the French equivalent to "horsepower" as a unit of power. The name 4CV thus refers to the car's tax horsepower.

== Conception and development ==
The 4CV was originally conceived and designed covertly by Renault engineers during the World War II German occupation of France, when the manufacturer was under strict orders to design and produce only commercial and military vehicles. Between 1941 and 1944 Renault was placed under the technical directorship of a francophile engineer, Wilhelm von Urach (between 1927 and 1940 employed by Daimler Benz) who failed to notice the small car project emerging on his watch. A design team led by the company's technical director, Fernand Picard, recently returned from Renault's aero-engine division to the auto business and Charles-Edmond Serre, who had been with Renault for longer than virtually anyone else, envisioned a small, economical car suitable for the period of austerity expected after the war. This was in contrast to Louis Renault himself who, in 1940, believed that after the war Renault would need to concentrate on its traditional mid-range cars Juvaquatre and Primaquatre. Jean-Auguste Riolfo, head of the test department, was made aware of the project from an early stage as were several other heads of department. In May 1941 Louis Renault himself burst into an office to find Serre and Picard studying a mock-up for the car's engine. By the end of an ad hoc meeting, Renault's approval for the project, now accorded the code "106E", was provided. However, because the Germans had forbidden work on any new passenger car models, the 4CV development was defined as a low priority spin-off from a project to develop a new engine for a post-war return of the company's 1930s small car, the Juvaquatre: departmental bosses installed by the Germans were definitely not to be trusted in respect of "Project 106E", while von Urach, their overlord, always managed to turn a blind eye to the whole business.

== Volkswagen influence ==
In November 1945 the government invited Ferdinand Porsche to France to explore the possibility of relocating the Volkswagen project to France as part of the reparations package then under discussion. On 15 December 1945, Porsche found himself invited to provide Renault with advice concerning their forthcoming Renault 4CV. Earlier that year, after the death in suspicious circumstances of Louis Renault, newly nationalised Renault had officially acquired a new boss, the former resistance hero Pierre Lefaucheux, who had been acting administrator since September 1944. He had been arrested by the Gestapo in June 1944, and deported to Buchenwald concentration camp. The Gestapo transferred him to Metz for interrogation, but the city was deserted because of the advancing allied front and the Germans abandoned their prisoner.

Lefaucheux was enraged that anyone should think the Renault 4CV, by then almost production-ready, was in any way inspired by the Volkswagen, and even more enraged that the politicians should presume to send Porsche to provide advice on it. The government insisted on nine meetings involving Porsche which took place in rapid succession. Lefaucheux insisted that the meetings would have absolutely no influence on the design of the Renault 4CV, and Porsche cautiously went on record with the view that the car would be ready for large scale production in a year.

Lefaucheux was a man with contacts. As soon as the 4CV project meetings mandated by the politicians had taken place, Porsche was arrested in connection with war crimes allegations involving the use of forced labour including French in the Volkswagen plant in Germany. Porsche was accompanied on his visit to the Renault plant by his son Ferry, and the two were offered release in return for a substantial cash payment. Porsche was able to provide only half of the amount demanded, with the result that Ferry Porsche was sent back to Germany, while Ferdinand Porsche, despite never facing any sort of trial, spent the next twenty months in a Dijon jail.

The first prototype had only two doors and was completed in 1942, and two more prototypes were produced in the following three years. Later, Lefaucheux, appointed to the top job at Renault early in 1945, tested the 4CV prototype at Louis Renault's Herqueville estate.

== Ready for release ==
In 1940, Louis Renault had, according to one source, directed his engineering team to "make him a car like the Germans'." Until the arrangement was simplified in 1945, the 4CV featured a 'dummy' grille comprising six thin horizontal chrome strips, intended to distract attention from the similarity of the car's overall architecture to that of the German Volkswagen, while recalling the modern designs of the fashionable front-engined passenger cars produced in Detroit during the earlier 1940s.

An important part of the 4CV's success was due to the new methodologies used in its manufacture, pioneered by Pierre Bézier. Bézier had begun his 42-year tenure at Renault as a tool setter, moving up to tool designer and then becoming head of the tool design office. As director of production engineering in 1949, he designed the transfer lines (or transfer machines) producing most of the mechanical parts for the 4CV. The transfer machines were high-performance work tools designed to machine engine blocks. While imprisoned during World War II, Bézier developed and improved on the automatic machine principle, introduced before the war by General Motors (GM). The new transfer station with multiple workstations and electromagnetic heads (antecedents to robots), enabled different operations on a single part to be consecutively performed by transferring the part from one station to another.

== Launch and market reception ==
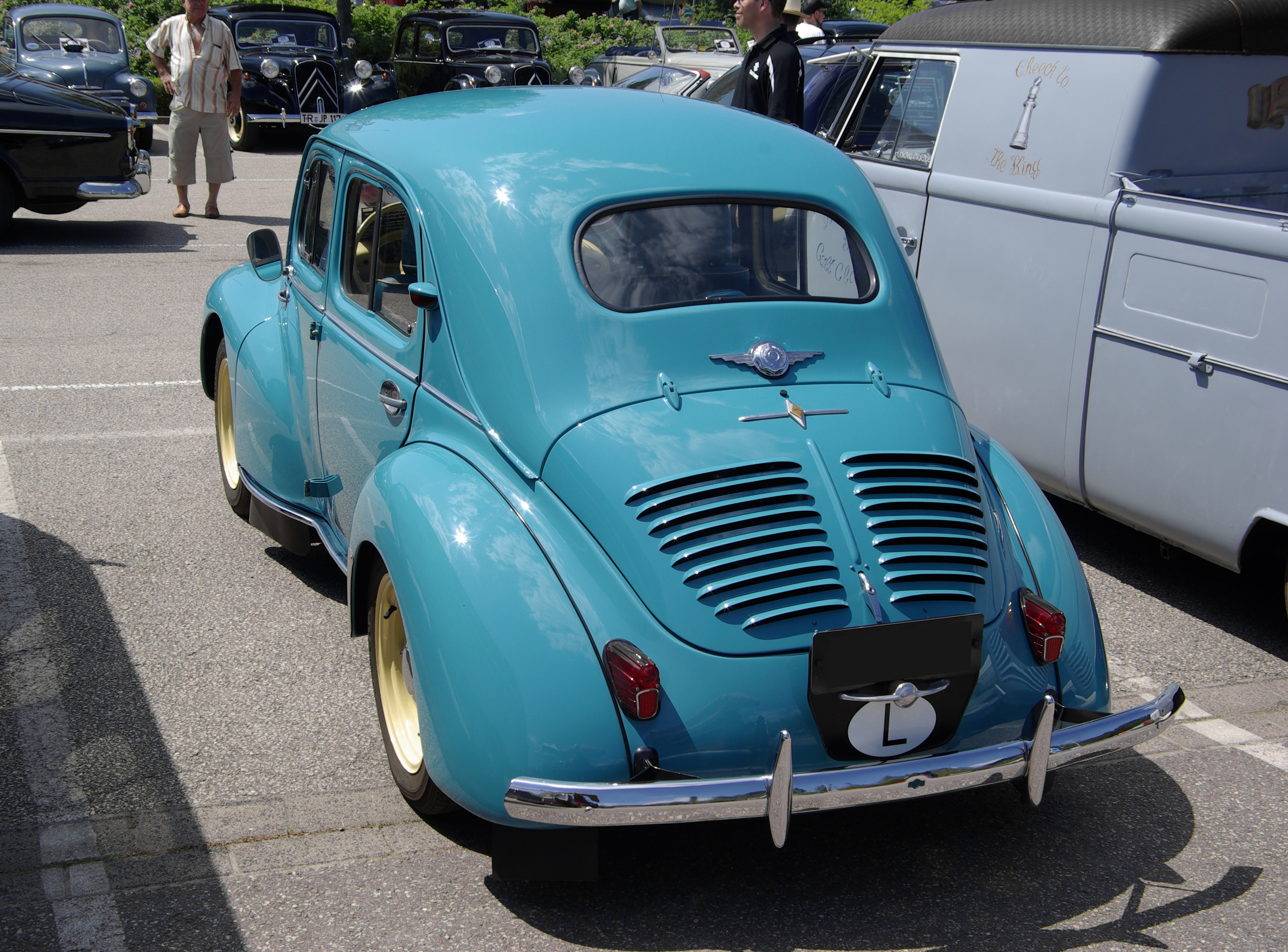
Rear view, with cooling louvres over the engine

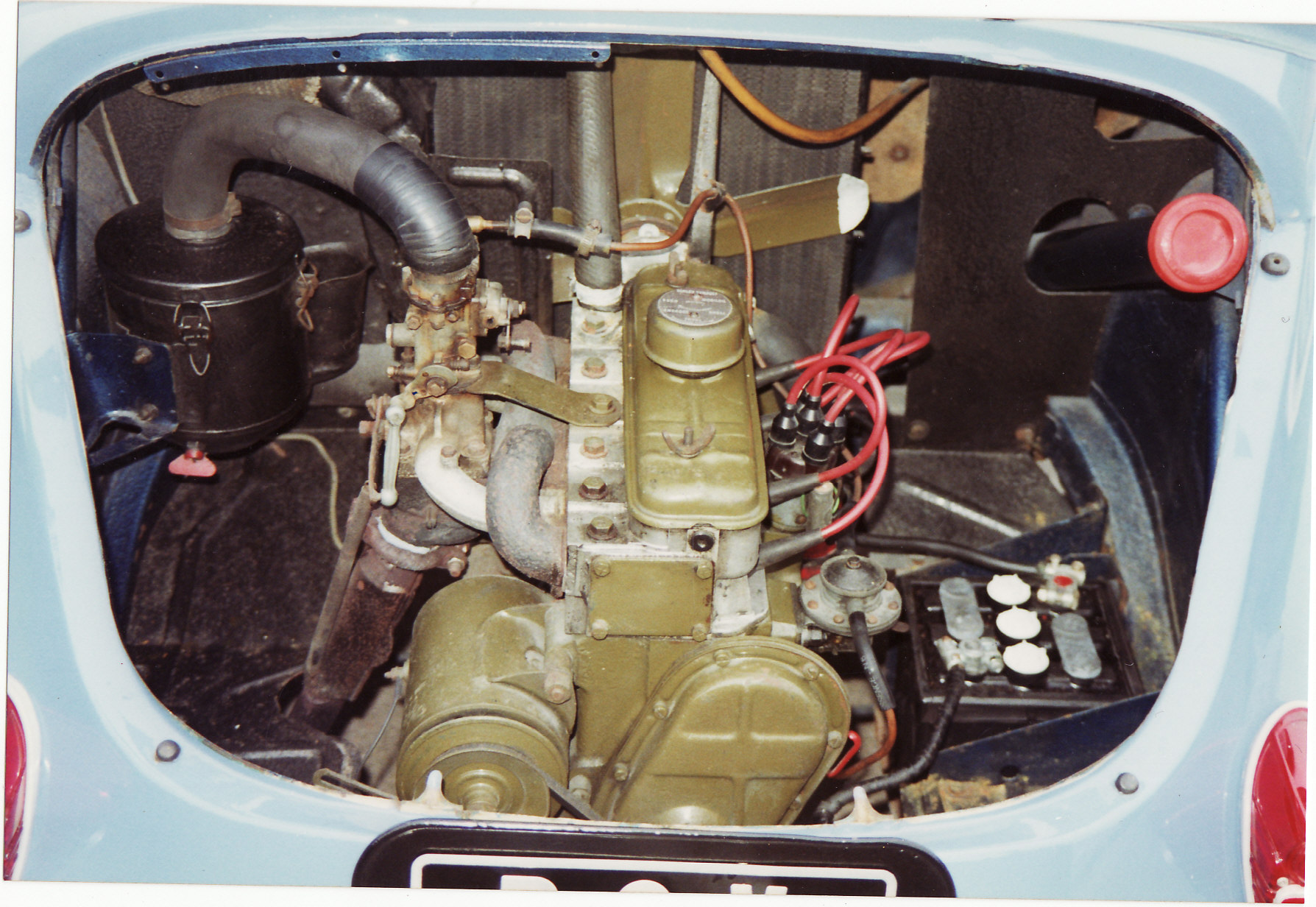
The longitudinally-mounted rear engine (1960 750 cc)

The 4CV was ultimately presented to the public and media at the 1946 Paris Motor Show and went on sale a year later. Volume production was said to have commenced at the company's Billancourt plant a few weeks before the Paris Motor Show of October 1947, although the cars were in very short supply for the next year or so. Renault's advertising highlighted the hundreds of machine-tools installed and processes adopted for the assembly of the first high volume car to be produced since the war, boasting that the little car was now no longer a prototype but a reality.

On the 4CV's launch, it was nicknamed "La motte de beurre" (the lump of butter); this was due to the combination of its shape and the fact that early deliveries all used surplus paint from the German Army vehicles of Rommel's Afrika Korps, which were a sand-yellow color. Later it was known affectionately as the "quatre pattes", "four paws". The 4CV was initially powered by a 760 cc rear-mounted four-cylinder engine coupled to a three-speed manual transmission. In 1950, the 760 cc unit was replaced by a narrower-bore, 747 cc version of the "Billancourt" engine producing 17 PS (12.5 kW). This marginally smaller variant was developed so as to stay beneath the significant 750 cc tax threshold in many markets.

Despite an initial period of uncertainty and poor sales due to the ravaged state of the French economy, the 4CV had sold 37,000 units by mid-1949 and was the most popular car in France. Across the Rhine 1,760 4CVs were sold in West Germany in 1950, accounting for 23% of that country's imported cars, and ranking second only to the Fiat 500 on the list. The car remained in production for more than another decade. Claimed power output increased subsequently to 21 hp (16 kW) as increased fuel octanes allowed for higher compression ratios, which along with the relatively low 620 kg (1,370 lb) weight of the car enabled the manufacturer to report a 0–90 km/h (0–56 mph) time of 38 seconds and a top speed barely under 100 km/h (62 mph). The engine was notable also for its flexibility, the second and top gear both being usable for speeds between 5 and 100 km/h (3 and 62 mph); the absence of synchromesh on first gear would presumably have discouraged use of the bottom gear except when starting from rest.

== Handling ==
The rear mounting of the engine meant that the steering could be highly geared while remaining relatively light; in the early cars, only 2¼ turns were needed from lock-to-lock. The unusually direct steering no doubt delighted some keen drivers, but road tests of the time nonetheless included warnings to take great care with the car's handling on wet roads due to oversteer. In due course, the manufacturer switched from one extreme to the other, and on later cars 4½ turns were needed to turn the steering wheel from lock to lock.

== Broadening the range downmarket ==
Early in 1953 the manufacturer launched a stripped-down version of the 4CV bereft of anything which might be considered a luxury. Tyre width was reduced, and the dummy grille was removed from the front of the car along with the chrome headlamp surrounds. The seats were simplified and the number of bars incorporated in the steering wheel reduced from three to two. The only colour offered was grey. The car achieved its objective of retailing for less than 400,000 Francs. With the Dauphine already at an advanced stage of development it may have made sense to try and expand the 4CV's own market coverage downwards in order to open up a clearer gap between the two models which would be produced in parallel for several years, but reaction to the down-market 4 CV, branded as the "Renault 4CV Service", must have disappointed Renault as this version of the car disappeared from the Renault showrooms after less than a year. The poor sales performance of the stripped-down "4CV Service" may have been linked to the growing popularity of the Citroën 2CV: although at this stage powered by an engine of just 375 cc and offering sclerotic performance, the 2CV was bigger than the Renault and in 1952 came with a starting price of just 341,870 francs.

== Replacement ==
The 4CV's direct replacement was the Dauphine, launched in 1956, but the 4CV remained in production until 1961. The 4CV was replaced by the Renault 4 which used the same engine as the 4CV and sold for a similar price.

== Around the world ==
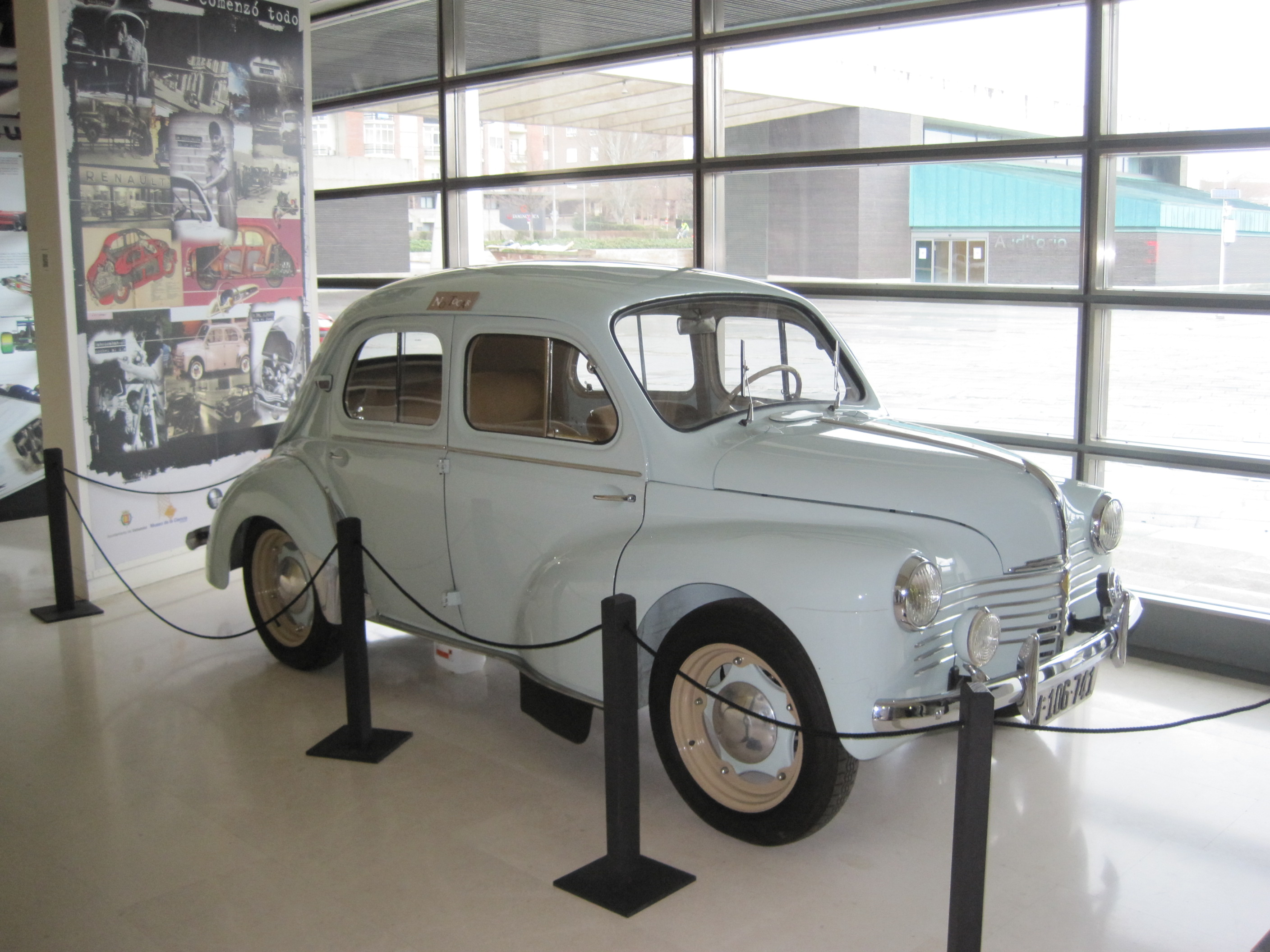
The first car of the Renault 4CV manufactured by FASA-Renault at the factory of Valladolid. The factory was opened in 1951. This copy is located in the Valladolid Science Museum.

Although most of the cars were assembled at Renault's Île Seguin plant located on an island in the Seine river opposite Billancourt, the 4CV was also assembled in seven other countries. In December 1949 it was announced that the car had replaced the company's Juvaquatre at the company's factory in Acton, West London, where right hand drive 4CVs were assembled using, for the most part, components imported from France. Other countries where 4CVs were assembled included Australia, Belgium, England, Ireland, Japan (where the Hino-assembled cars gained a reputation for superior quality), Spain and South Africa.

Across the world 1,105,543 cars were produced; the 4CV became the first French car to sell over a million units.

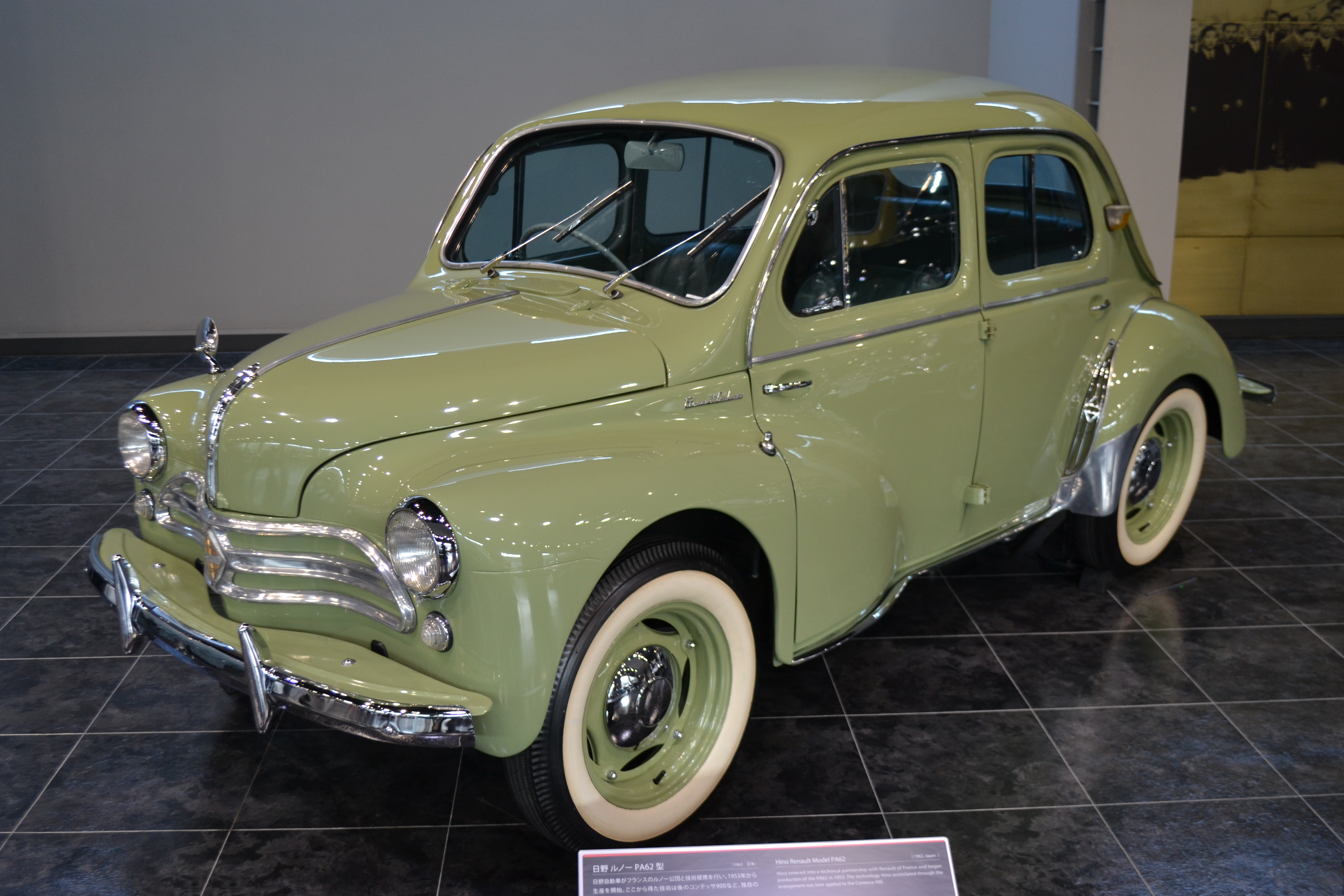
1962 Hino PA62

- In Spain, the 4CV was produced by FASA's Valladolid factory from 1951–1961.
- In Japan, the 4CV was also manufactured under licence by Hino Motors, Ltd. from 1953–1961, rebadged as the Hino Renault 4CV, then later replaced by the Hino Contessa while still using the Renault powertrain.
- In Australia, the 4CV was marketed from 1949–1961, initially as the Renault 760 and later as the Renault 750. It was imported in both fully assembled and CKD form, with assembly of the latter undertaken in Sydney.

The 4CV was easily modified, and was used extensively as a racing car. The first collaboration between the Alpine company and Renault was the Alpine A106 which was based on the 4CV. The partnership would go on to win the 1973 World Rally Championship with the Alpine A110.

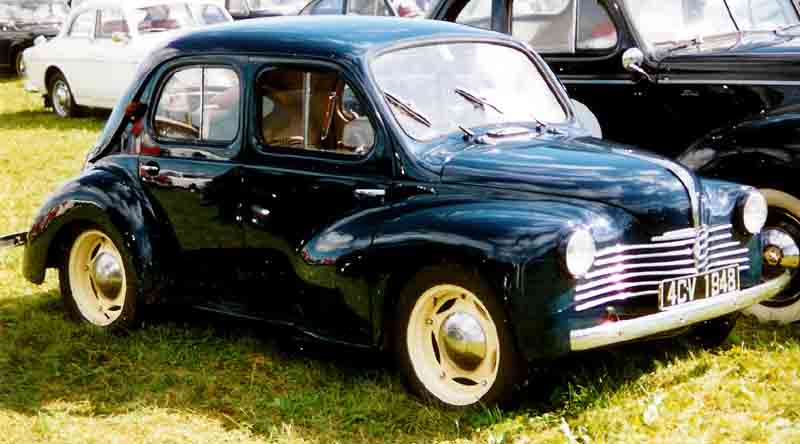
1948 Renault 4CV

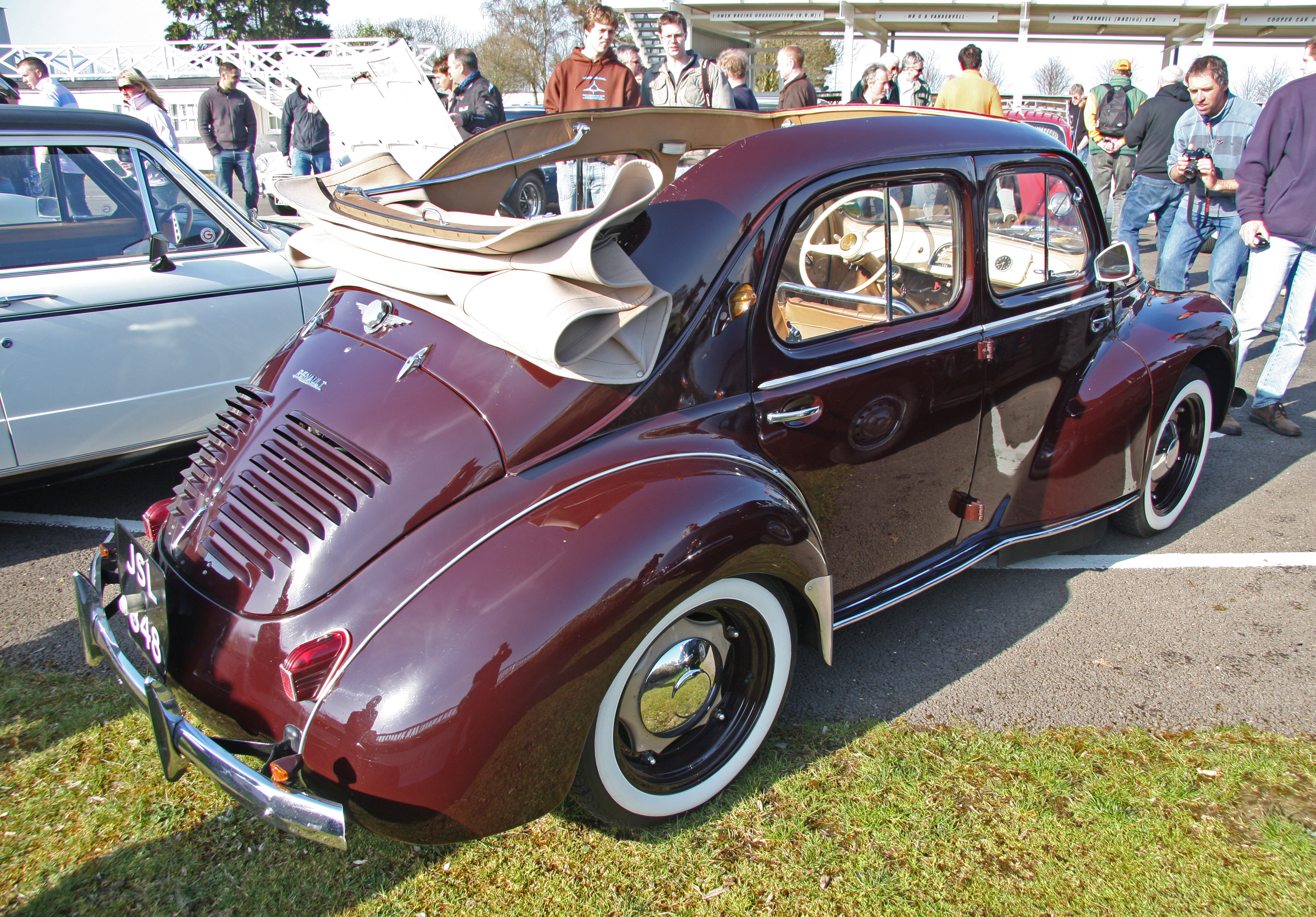
Renault 4CV Cabriolet

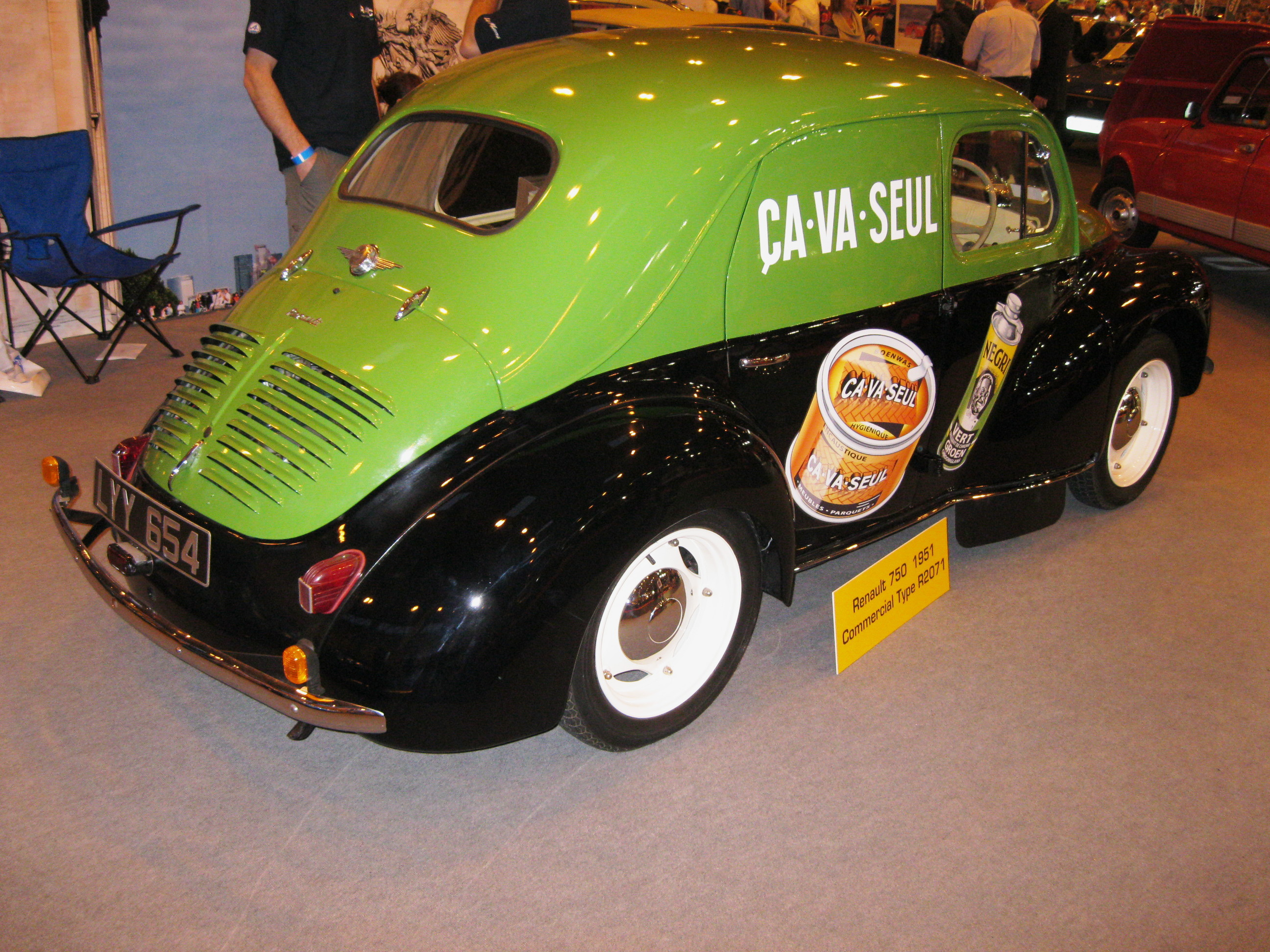
1951 Renault 750 Commercial Type R0271

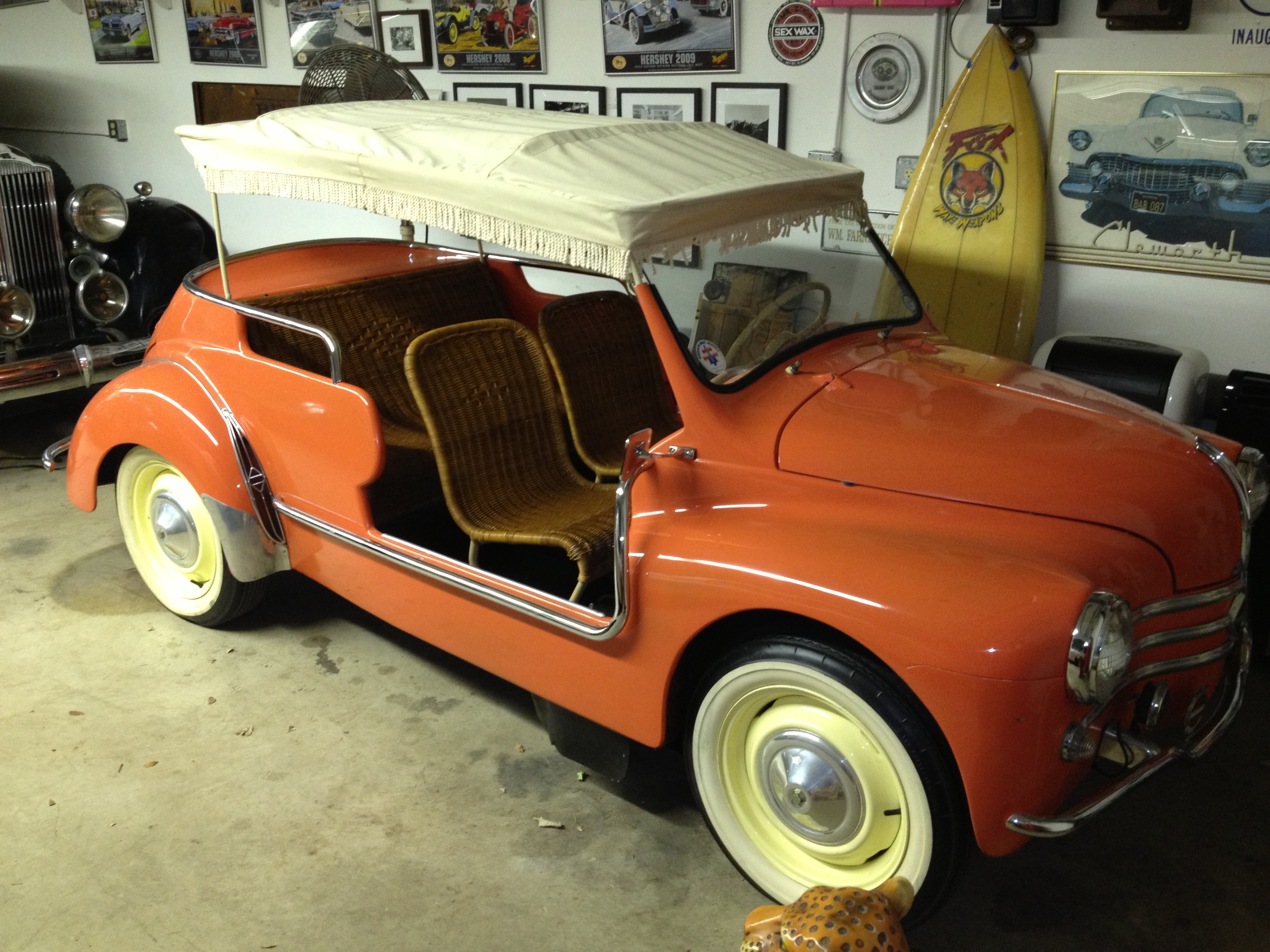
1961 Renault 4CV Beach Wagon (Renault Jolly)

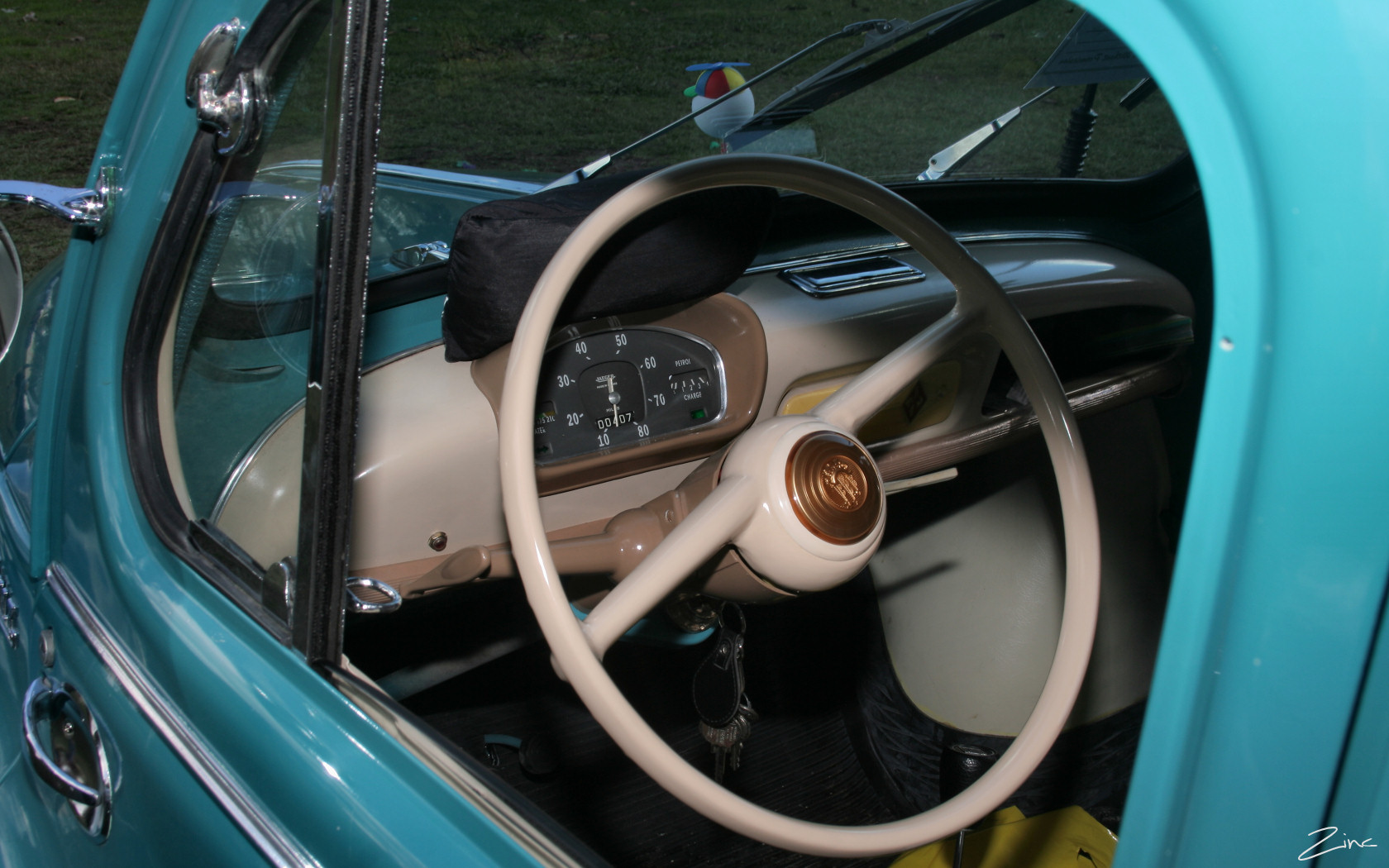
1960 Renault 4CV dashboard view

== Renault Beach Wagon ==
A variant of the 4CV was the Renault Beach Wagon, also known as the Renault Jolly. 50 of these were built by Ghia in 1961 using consecutively serial numbered 4CV's; approximately a dozen are estimated to exist today.

== Renault Fiftie ==
In 1996, Renault presented a concept car — the Renault Fiftie — to celebrate the 50th anniversary of the 4CV's début. It was a two-door, mid-engine design with styling similar to the 4CV.
