= Renault ACx and ADx =

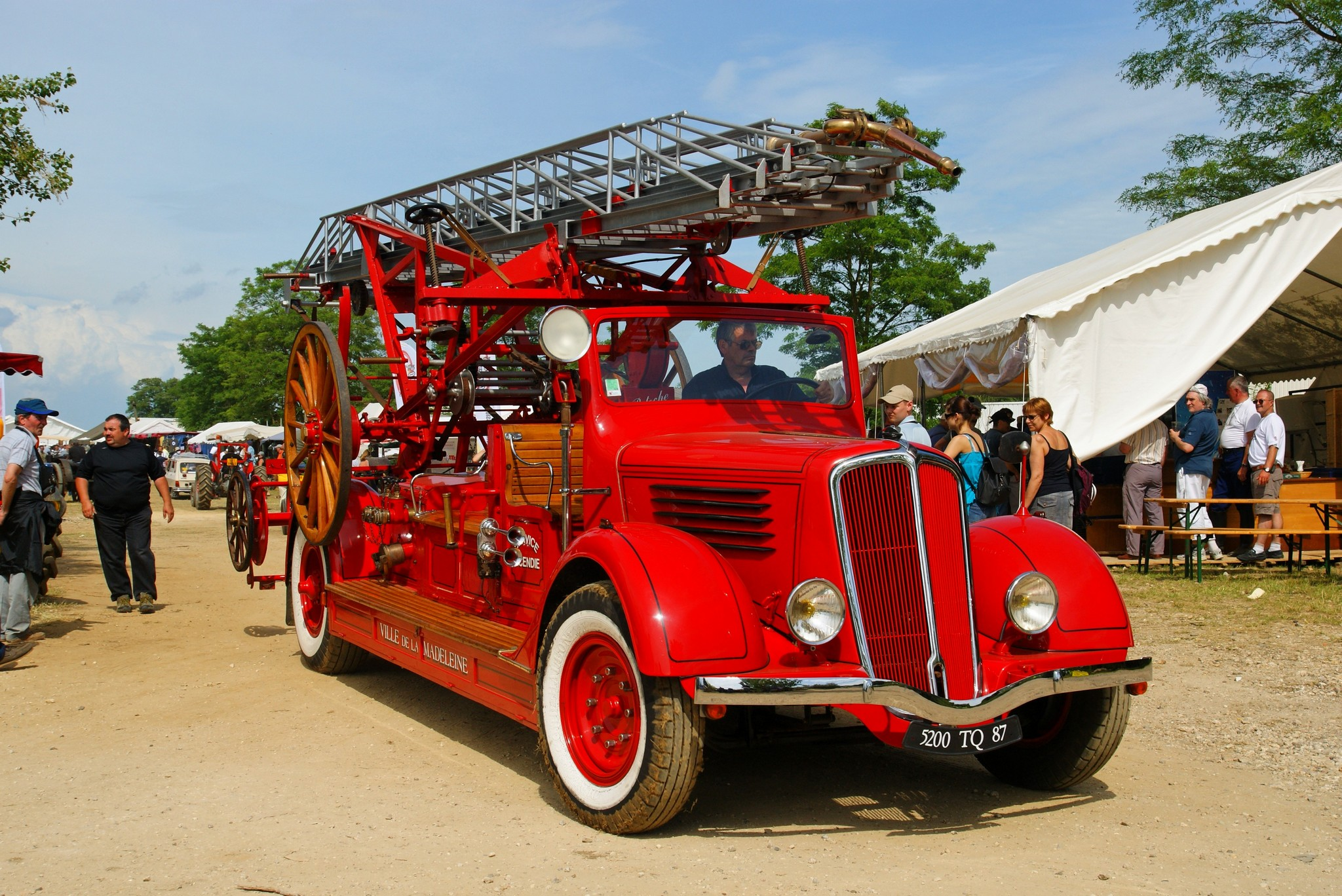
- Renault ADR

Overview
- Type: Light/medium truck
- Manufacturer: Renault
- Also called: Renault ADV; Renault ACZ; Renault ADZ; Renault ADK; Renault ADH; Renault ADR; Renault ADN; Renault ADJ
- Production: 1935–1940
- Assembly: Boulogne-Billancourt, France

Body and chassis
- Layout: Front-engine, rear-wheel drive

Chronology
- Predecessor: Renault YN/Renault KZ/Renault OS/Renault PR
- Successor: Renault AFR/Renault AGx

The Renault ACx and ADx is a range of light/medium trucks produced by the French manufacturer Renault between 1935 and 1940. From the range derived some buses.

== History and technical details ==
The Renault commercial vehicles for 1936 adopted the styling of its passenger cars, with a curved cabin, a V-shaped, angled grille extending below the bonnet and horizontal slits on the sides of the engine compartment.

=== Renault ADV ===
The Renault ADV is a light truck produced between 1936 and 1938. It has a 0.5 tonnes payload and replaced the Renault YN commercial version. Its engine is a 1.46-litre inline-four petrol unit also used by its predecessor and the Renault Celtaquatre. At first, the engine had a power output of 30 metric horsepower (22 kW) at 3,350 rpm, increased in 1937 to 34 metric horsepower (25 kW) at 3,400 rpm. The wheelbase is 2,660 millimetres (105 in), the width 1,600 millimetres (63 in) and the length 4,100 millimetres (160 in). The gearbox is a 3-speed manual unit. The suspension is made of longitudinal springs on front and transversal springs on rear. The dampers are hydraulic on both front and rear. Renault produced a version adapted for right-hand drive markets, mainly the UK, called ADV2.

The ADV was sold at 17,000 F in France, it was cheaper that its equivalent from Citroën (which was priced at 18,000 F ) and it was also slightly more capable.

=== Renaults ADZ, ACZ and ADK ===
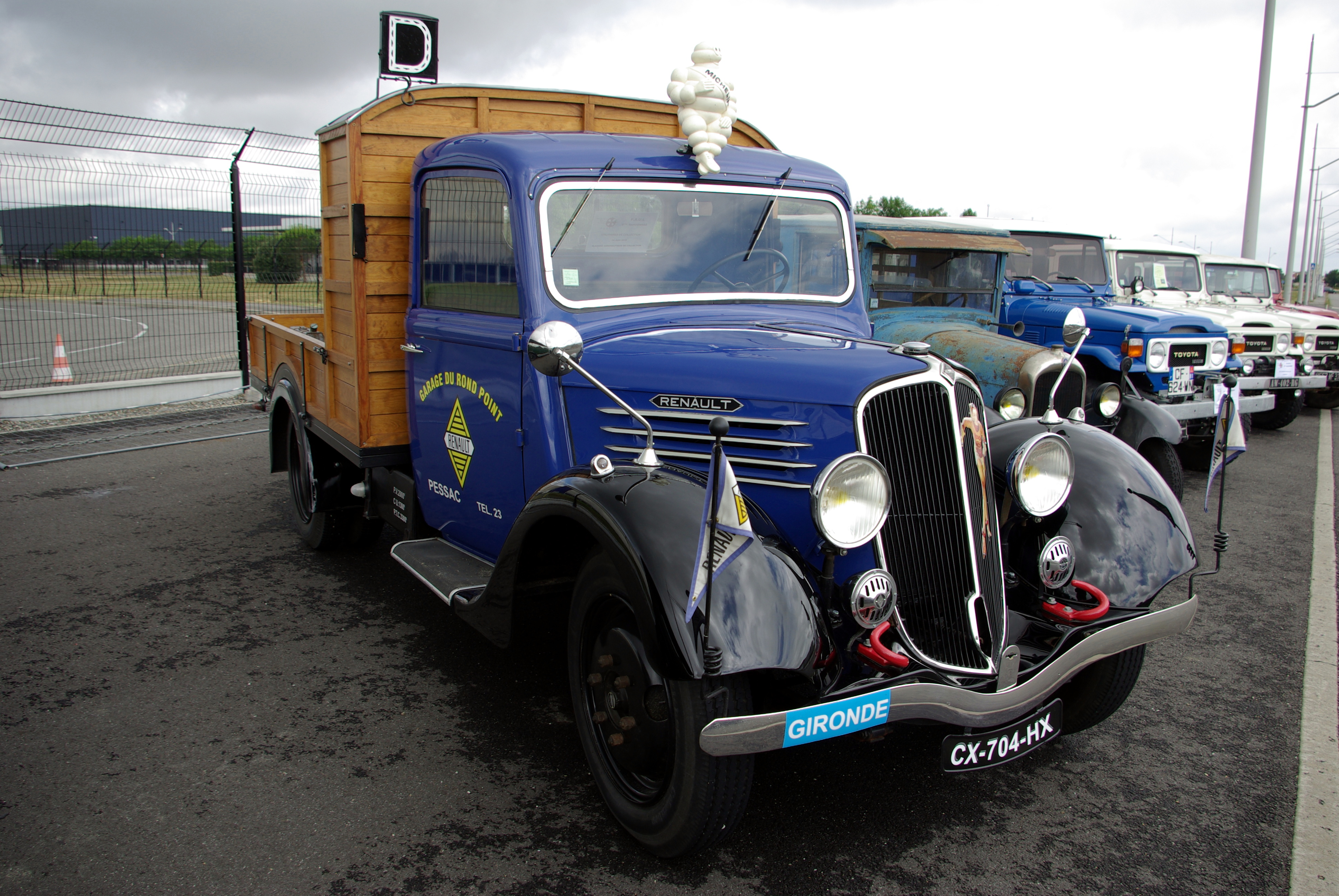
A Renault ACZ

A Renault ADZ

The Renaults ADZ, ACZ and ADK are closely related light trucks that replaced the KZ, OS and PR ranges. The three models have a 2.38-litre inline-four petrol engine codenamed 85 (the engine would be used on Renault light commercial vehicles until the 1950s). The engine's power output is 48 metric horsepower (35 kW) at 3,000 rpm. The clutch is a manually operated single disc unit. The ACZ and the ADK has double wheels on the rear and a suspension designed for heavier loads than the used on the ADZ. The ADK was the only with servomechanical brakes. The ACZ and the ADK had a 4-speed manual transmission and the ADZ a 3-speed manual. The ADZ has a version for right-hand drive markets called ADZ2. The ADZ has a payload of 0.8 tonnes, the ACZ of 1.3 tonnes, the ADK of 2 tonnes.

The ACZ was produced between 1935 and 1939. The ADZ was produced between 1936 and 1937 and was replaced by the AFR. The ADK was produced between 1936 and 1938 and was replaced by the AGC.

=== Renault ADH ===
The Renault ADH is a light truck with a payload between 1 and 2.5 tonnes. Its engines are a 4-litre inline-four petrol unit with a power output of 65 metric horsepower (48 kW) at 2,200 rpm and a 4.3-litre inline-four diesel (ADHD) with a power output of 45 metric horsepower (33 kW) at 1,800 rpm. It has a 4-speed manual gearbox. The truck was offered in long and short version. For military use, it was mainly produced using the short version, having a 3,430 millimetres (135 in) wheelbase, a 5,520 millimetres (217 in) length and a 2,200 millimetres (87 in) width. The military version of the ADH has a less powerful petrol engine than the civilian (62 metric horsepower (46 kW) at 2,350 rpm) and a 5-speed gearbox. In 1940, the ADH replaced its "aerodynamic" grille for a simpler rectangular one.

=== Renault ADR ===
The Renault ADR was the last Renault truck that was non-forward control on the 3.5 payload class. The civilian version has two engines: a 4-litre inline-four petrol unit with a power output of 65 metric horsepower (48 kW) at 2,200 rpm and a 4.3-litre inline-four diesel (ADRD) with a power output of 45 metric horsepower (33 kW) at 1,800 rpm. It has a 4-speed manual gearbox. The truck was replaced by the AGR.

== Buses ADJ and ADN ==
The Renault ADN is a bus/coach using the 2.38-litre engine of the ADZ/ACZ/ADK family which is able to transport up to 14 passengers. The ADJ is also a bus/coach which could be fitted with either a 4-litre petrol or a 4.7-litre diesel engine. It can carry up to 23 passengers.

== Heavy vehicles ==
The 6.5-tonne payload ADS and the 7.5-tonne ADT are two forward control heavy trucks for 1937 not related to the rest of the range. They were unveiled at the 1936 Paris Salon and both were powered by a 12.5-litre diesel engine. They were replaced by the similarly looking AGx range from late 1937.

== Publications ==
- Vauvillier, François; Touraine, Jean-Michel; Jeudy, Jean-Gabriel (1992). L'Automobile Sous l'Uniforme 1939–1940 [The Car in Uniform 1939–1940] (in French). Editions Ch. Massin. ISBN 2-7072-0197-9.
