= Renault Novaquatre =

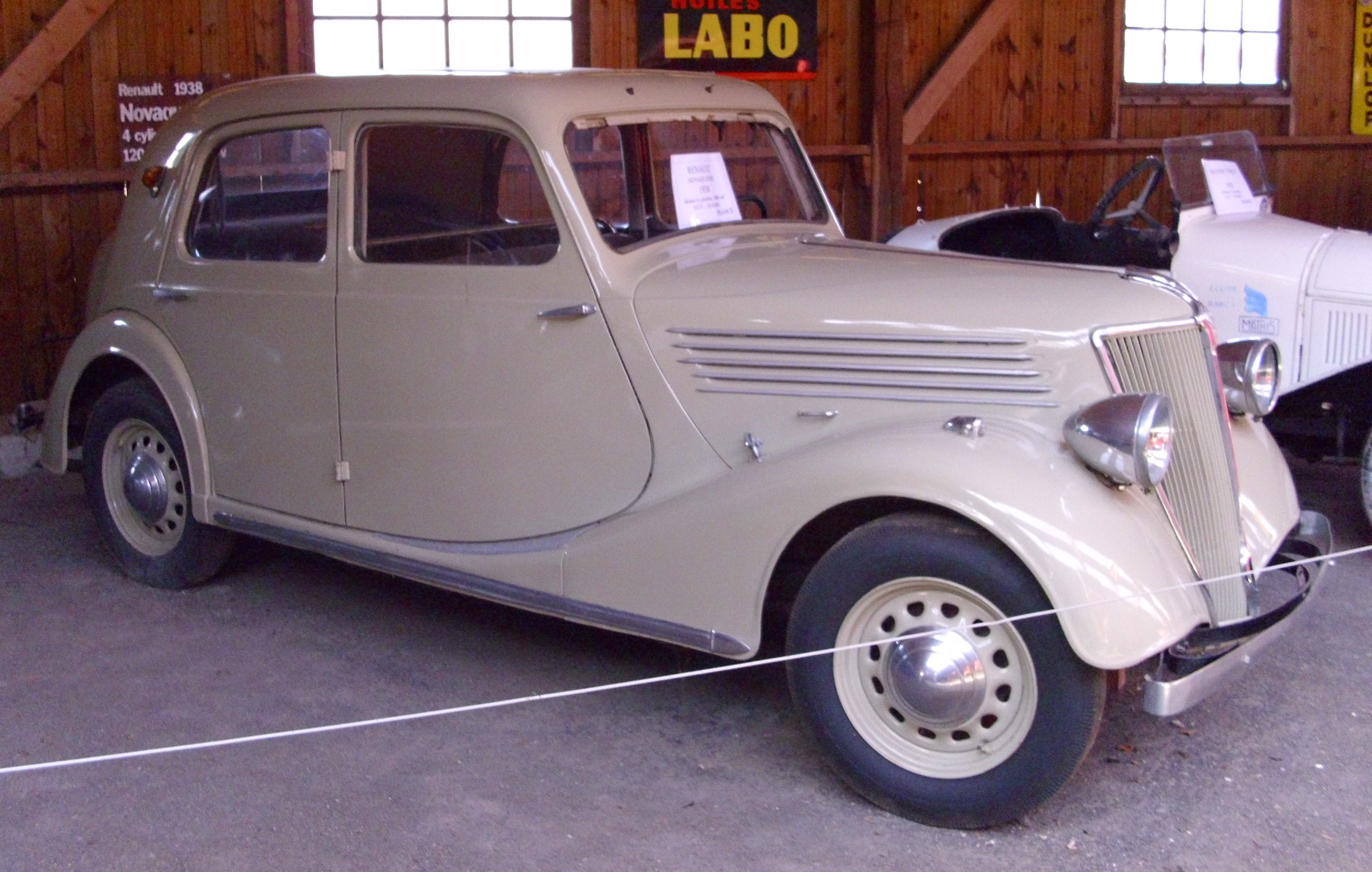
- Renault Novaquatre

Overview
- Manufacturer: Renault
- Production: 1937–1940
- Assembly: France: Île Seguin, Boulogne-Billancourt, Paris

Body and chassis
- Class: Mid-size car
- Body style: 4-door Sedan
- Layout: FR layout

Powertrain
- Engine: 1937–1939: 2383 cc I4, 48 hp (36 kW); 1939–1940: 1813 cc I4, 38 hp (28 kW)
- Transmission: 3-speed manual

Dimensions
- Wheelbase: earlier cars: 2,710 mm (106.7 in) later cars: 2,830 mm (111.4 in)
- Curb weight: 1,080 kg (2,380 lb)/1,140 kg (2,510 lb)

Chronology
- Predecessor: Renault Celtaquatre

The Renault Novaquatre is a car first presented in the autumn of 1937 by Renault and produced until 1940. It was presented in 1937 as an economy version of the Primaquatre, combining the body of the little Renault Celtaquatre, with the 2383 cc 4-cylinder water-cooled engine of the larger Renault Primaquatre.

Supporting its credentials as an economy model, the engine in the Novaquatre came with a listed maximum output of 48 hp (36 kW) at 3,000 rpm as opposed the 52 hp (39 kW) at 3,300 rpm for the Primaquatre with what was, on paper, much the same engine. The Primaquatre also came with a much reduced thirst for fuel, with consumption quoted at 9/10 litres per 100 km as against 12/13 litres for the more powerful car.

A top speed of 110 km/h (69 mph) was claimed for the car in its original form, although this reduced to 100 km/h (63 mph) at the end of 1939 when a smaller engine replaced the original unit. Power was transmitted to the rear wheels via a conventional three-speed manual transmission.

The Celtaquatre had ceased production in April 1938 and was effectively replaced by both the (slightly smaller) Renault Juvaquatre and by the Novaquatre. With the disappearance of the Celtaquatre the 2,710 mm (106.7 in) wheelbase also disappeared from the range, and the Novaquatre was slightly lengthened. The standard four-door saloon-bodied Novaquatre now sat on a wheelbase of 2,830 mm (111.4 in), which had already been used for the "Commerciale" version of the Celtaquatre.

In September 1939, France, like Britain, declared war in Germany and in June 1940 the German Army invaded and rapidly occupied northern France. These seismic military events give context to the changes that the model underwent, and explain the shortness of its production run. Late in 1939, the engine was replaced with a smaller, 1813 cc unit, and the car’s cable brakes were replaced by Lockheed hydraulic brakes. The new Novaquatre BFH1 would presumably have been presented formally in October at the 1939 Motor Show had the event not been cancelled.

Relatively few Novaquatres were produced. Taking the April 1940 factory output of 716 cars, 441 were Juvaquatres, 240 were Primaquatres and just 35 were Novaquatres. A couple of months later, probably before the German invasion, Novaquatre production came to an end.

== Types ==
- BDR1/2 (1937–1939)
- BFH1 (1939–1940)
