= Renault Juvaquatre =

Small family car produced by Renault (1937–1960)

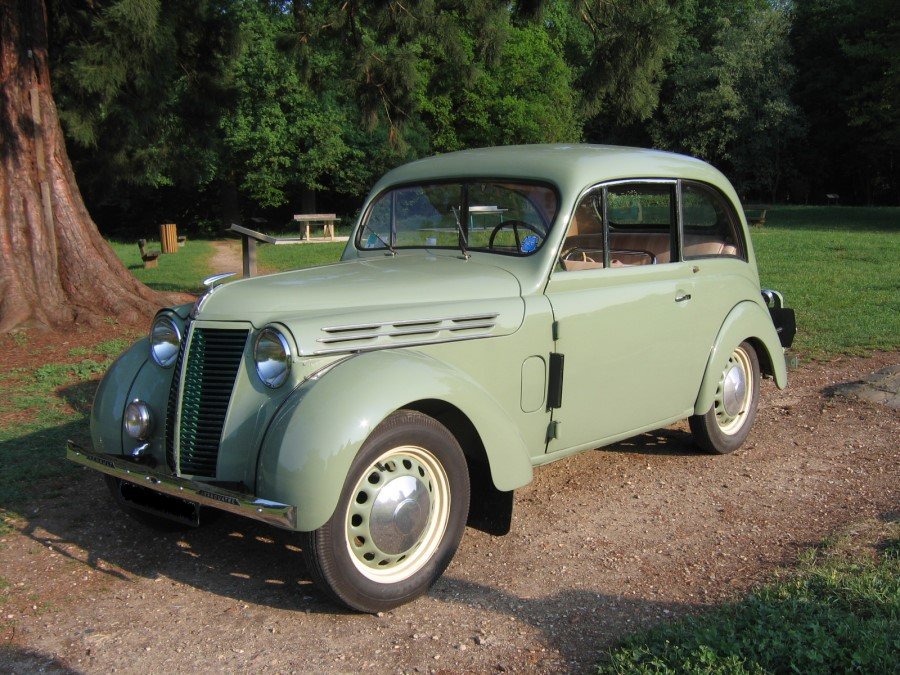

Overview
- Manufacturer: Renault
- Also called: Renault Dauphinoise; Renault Juva 4
- Production: 1937–1960
- Assembly: France: Île Seguin, Boulogne-Billancourt; Belgium: Haren-Vilvoorde (RIB)
- Designer: Louis Renault

Body and chassis
- Class: Compact car / Small family car (C)
- Body style: 2-door saloon 4-door saloon 2-door coupé 2-door panel van 2-door estate
- Layout: FR layout

Powertrain
- Engine: 1003 cc 6CV I4; 747 cc 4CV I4; 845 cc 5CV I4
- Transmission: 3-speed manual

Dimensions
- Wheelbase: 2,350 mm (93 in)
- Length: 3,720 mm (146 in)

Chronology
- Predecessor: Renault Celtaquatre
- Successor: Renault 4CV (passenger version); Renault 4 (commercial)

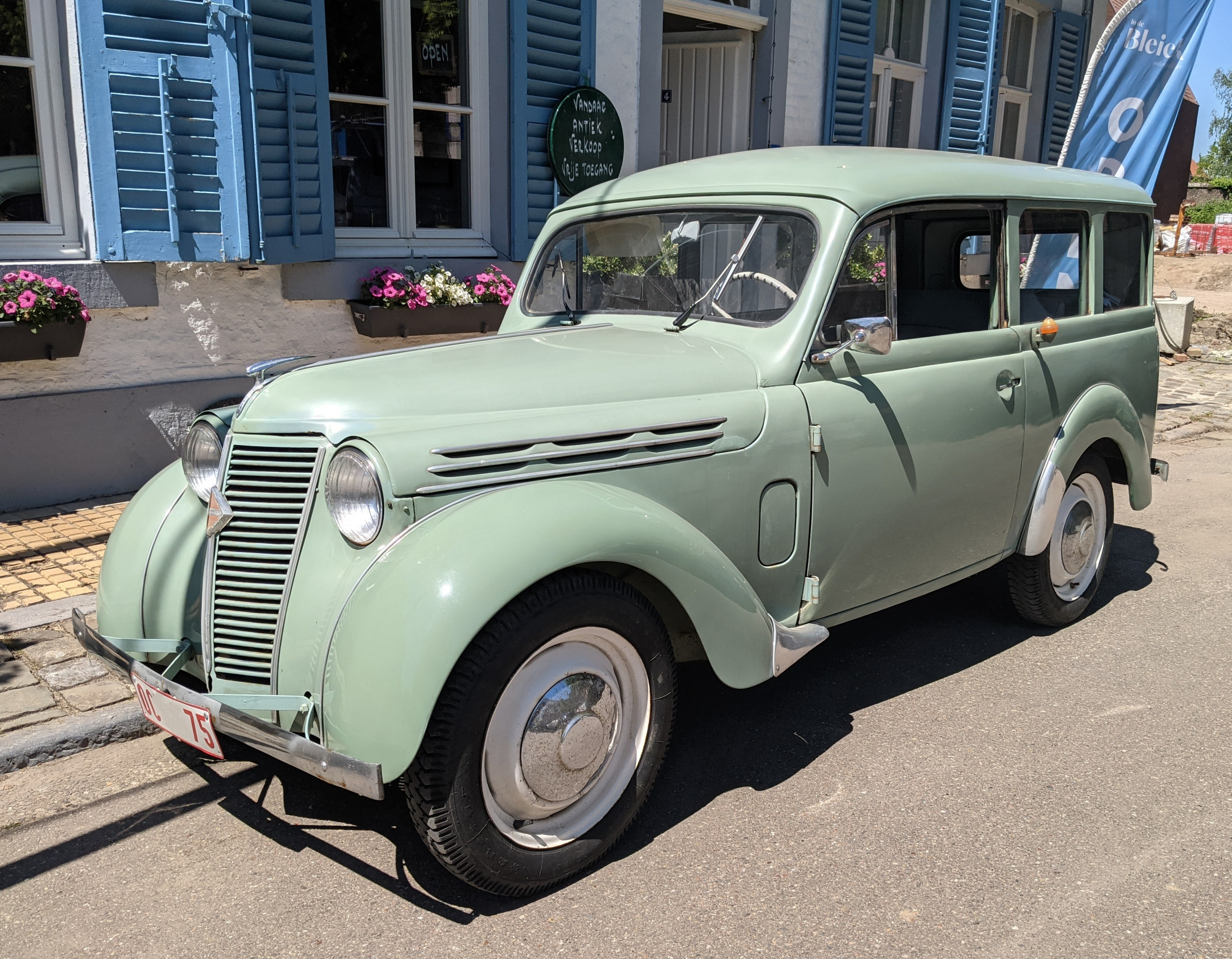
Renault Dauphinoise (i.e. Juvaquatre Break)

The Renault Juvaquatre (French: [ʒyvakatʁ]) is a small family car / compact car produced by the French manufacturer Renault between 1937 and 1960, although production stopped or slowed to a trickle during the war years. The Juvaquatre was produced as a sedan/saloon until 1948 when the plant switched its full attention to the new Renault 4CV. During the second half of 1952 the plant restarted production of the Juvaquatre sedans/saloons for a period of approximately five months.

In 1950 a van based station wagon body joined the range; later models of the station wagon (from 1956 on) were known as the Renault Dauphinoise (French: [dofinwaz]). The sedan/saloon found itself overshadowed and was soon withdrawn from production after the appearance in 1946 of the Renault 4CV (which was France's top selling car in the post-Second World War years). However, there was no estate version of the rear engined 4CV or Dauphine, and the Juvaquatre "Dauphinoise" station wagon remained in production until replaced by the Renault 4 in 1960.

== Origins ==
The Juvaquatre was originally conceived in 1936 by Louis Renault as a small, affordable car designed to occupy the 6CV car tax class and to fit in the Renault range below existing more upmarket models such as the Primaquatre and Celtaquatre. The company was focused on creating new customers who would not otherwise buy Renaults, and on appealing to the new class of lower-income consumer created by changing labor conditions and the rise of the Popular Front in France in the 1930s (which ironically had adversely affected Renault considerably). The Juvaquatre was heavily inspired by the German Opel Olympia, a car by which the patron had been impressed during a 1935 visit to Berlin. Consequently, the Juvaquatre, particularly early models, bore a strong resemblance to the Olympia.

== Launch ==
The Juvaquatre was showcased at the 1937 Paris Motor Show, on the opening day of which Louis Renault was photographed showing a Juvaquatre to President Lebrun. The motor show launch was part of a wider strategy to prepare for the start of volume production the next year. The first production prototype, identified as the "Juvaquatre AEB1", had been homologated with the relevant agency in February 1937. Four months later, in the early summer, Louis Renault gave orders for the construction of a batch of at least twenty preproduction prototypes identified as the "Juvaquatre AEB2". Most of these were handed over to a selection of major Renault distributors who were invited to submit the cars to technical and customer appraisals. On the basis of the reports received following this exercise the engineers at Renault's Billancourt plant were able to apply the necessary modifications before volume production of the "AEB2" got underway in April 1938.

On the publicity front, a non-stop endurance run was organised during the closing days of March 1938: a Juvaquatre was driven flat out round and round the Montlhéry racing circuit (a short distance to the west of Paris), driven by a team of four drivers who took turns to cover a distance of 5,391 kilometers (3,350 miles) during 50 hours at an average speed which was computed at slightly under 109 km/h (68 mph).

== Details ==
=== Bodies ===
During the initial production phase, all Juvaquatres came as two-door saloons (commonly called a "coach" body in French). The steel body was welded into the chassis-platform in order to create what was for most purposes a monocoque body shell. Instead of perching on the front wings, the headlights, were integrated into the body, which was seen as a clear tribute to the Opel Olympia, although the idea of integrating headlights in this way had originated not with Opel but, in 1934, with the American Hupmobile Type 518 of 1934.

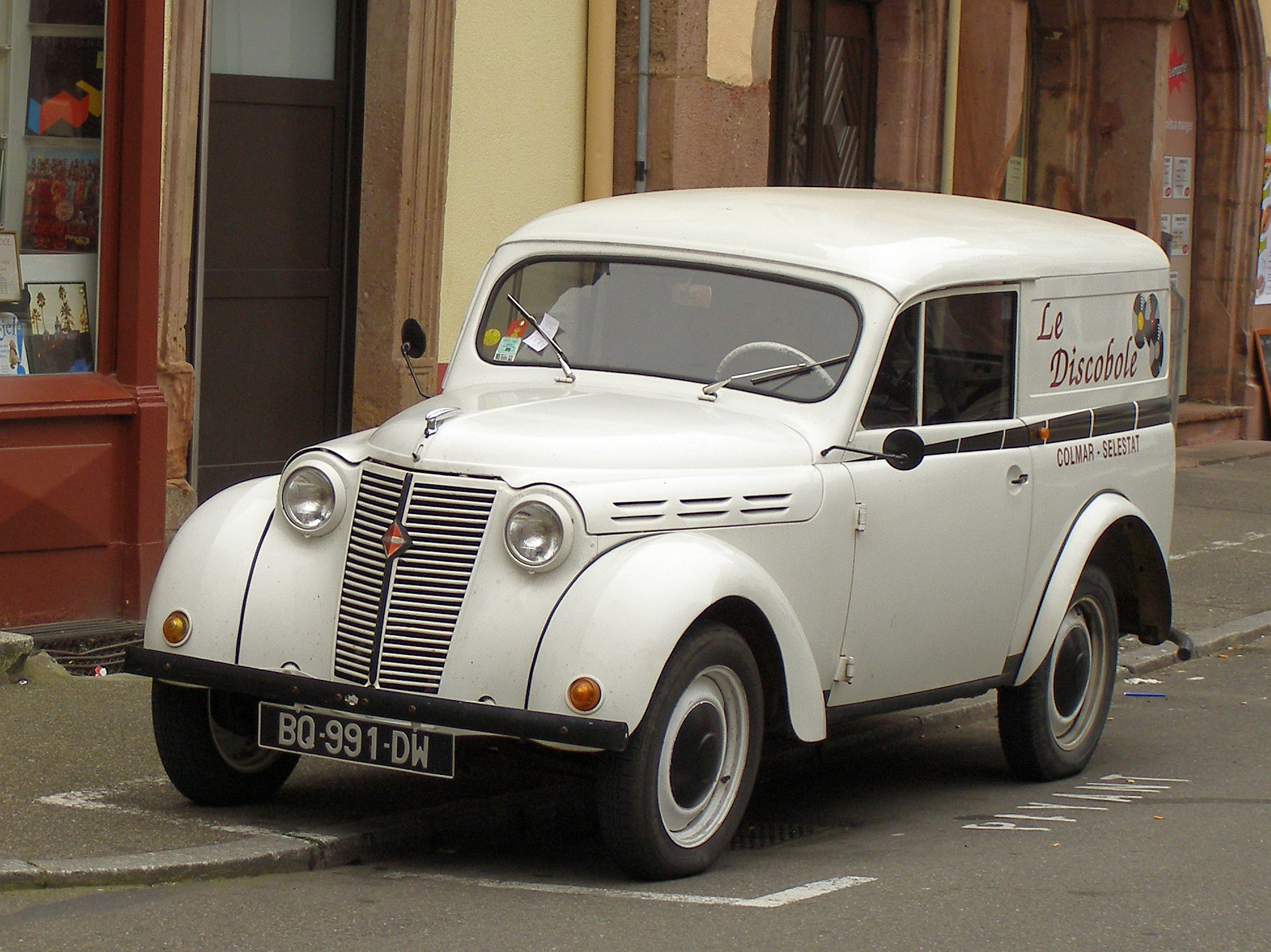
Renault Dauphinoise fourgonnette

A camionnette (van) version of the Juvaquatre was developed soon afterwards for commercial usage and was used extensively by La Poste. When the van version reappeared in 1948, after the war the "camionnette" appellation for the little van was switched to "fourgonnette".

Public demand for four-door cars, and the introduction of affordable four-door models from the rival manufacturers Peugeot and Simca, led to the appearance of a four-door Juvaquatre (normally described in French-language sources as a "berline" bodied car) from April 1939.

Perhaps 80 two-seater coupé bodied Juvaquatres were built between 1939 and 1946, of which most were based on the prewar model and produced in 1939 and 1940. There was probably an intention to resume production of the coupé after the war, but the tooling was never commissioned to produce the necessary steel body-panels using heavy presses, which would have been necessary to produce the design in commercial volumes. According to one source a final batch of 30 coupés was produced between December 1945 and January 1946, while elsewhere it is recorded that production of this version was not resumed after the war. Nevertheless, one was still on display at the Brussels Motor Show in January 1948, adding to the variety on the Renault show stand and suggesting that at that stage it was still intended to produce more Juvaquatre coupés.

A station wagon model based on the van, known initially simply as the "Renault Break 300 Kg" was launched only in 1950. This version, rebranded in 1956 as the "Renault Dauphinoise", would remain in production for nearly a decade after the withdrawal of the saloon/sedan versions of the Juvaquatre, since the rear engined configurations of Renault's post war small cars, the 4CV and the Dauphine made them far less suitable for conversion to the station wagon format than the front engined Juvaquatre.

=== Engine ===
The four-cylinder water-cooled engine with which the Juvaquatre was launched in 1937 (and which continued to power the car till the mid-1950s) shared the 95 mm cylinder stroke of the broadly similar engine that had powered the Renault Celtaquatre since 1934. On the Juvaquatre the cylinder bore (diameter) was reduced to 58 mm, however, giving rise to an overall engine capacity of just 1003cc. The engine was a side-valve unit, and at launch a maximum power output of 23 hp (17 kW) was listed. Significantly, market dynamics dictated that Renault's Juvaquatre was destined to spend more than ten years competing head to head with the Peugeot 202 which from the start came with a more efficient OHV power unit (and more power).

The old side-valve unit was finally laid to rest in 1952 and the Juvaquatre Break (estate/station wagon) which was by now the only surviving Juvaquatre version received the smaller 747-cc engine from the Renault 4CV. The overhead valve unit produced slightly less power than before, but the Juvaquatre Break was valued for its dependability and low cost rather than for performance, and the new unit came with the bonus of a lower annual car tax bill now that the model was in the 4CV tax band. In 1956 the car moved back up a notch to the 5CV band when it received the bored out version of the same engine, as fitted at the back of the new Renault Dauphine. The connection with the Dauphine was stressed by the rebranding of the Juvaquatre Break which was now christened the Renault Dauphinoise. The engine size was now 845 cc and listed maximum power was up to 26 hp SAE (19 kW).

=== Running gear and brakes ===
Power was transmitted from the front-mounted engine to the rear wheels via a traditional three-speed manual gear box, with synchromesh on the upper two ratios.

The Juvaquatre featured independent suspension at the front. Renault were the last of the "big 3" French automakers, in 1937, to offer independent front suspension on a passenger car: Peugeot had claimed a world first for independent front suspension in the volume car sector, with a 1931 upgrade for the Peugeot 201, and Citroen had made a start back in 1934. The front suspension assemblies on the Juvaquatre were intended to minimize the risk of wear on the components leading to misalignment of the wheels, featuring just three joints on each assembly and the transversely mounted leaf spring constituting the fourth flexible element of a simple parallelogramme structure. The rear wheels were attached using the tried and trusted combination of a rigid axle mounted with transverse leaf springs.

The brakes on the Juvaquatre were mechanically controlled on the early cars, but Lockheed Corporation Hydraulic brakes were introduced in 1939.

== Market positioning ==
A feature of the French auto-market during the final years of the 1930s was the emergence of a modern category of small family cars in the 6CV taxation class, offering modern body designs clearly influenced by the streamlining fashion of that time. The Renault Juvaquatre was one of three major players in this category which, thanks to the intervention of war, was still significant in the late 1940s. The Renault's side-valve engine positioned it at the bargain-basement end of the class, confirmed by an advertised starting price for the two-door sedan/saloon of 16,500 Francs at the 1937 Paris Motor Show. The Peugeot 202 was not exhibited at the 1937 show, but went on sale early in 1938 with a starting price of 21,300 Francs for a car with four doors and a more modern engine, while the Simca 8, essentially a rebadged, locally assembled Fiat, appeared at the 1937 show already with hydraulic brakes, a four-speed gear box and independent front suspension, advertised at a sticker price of 23,900 francs for the four-door "Normale" sedan/saloon. Half a class up, the front-wheel-drive 7CV Amilcar Compound, was advertised at the Motor Show at an aggressive 21,700 Francs for a "coach-normal" (2-door base version) with independent front suspension. Despite its side-valve engine, the Amilcar was in several respect more technically ambitious than the other three cars identified here, but the manufacturer lost its independence in 1937 and the name would disappear in 1940.

Ten years later, after a period of savage currency depreciation, the advertised prices had changed, but the relative positions of three competitors in the 6CV class had not. At the 1947 Paris Motor Show the Juvaquatre, now offering four doors and independent front suspension as standard, came with an advertised starting price of 260,000 Francs. The Peugeot 202, its showroom appeal now enhanced with the inclusion of a steel panel sun-roof, was priced at 303,600 Francs while the sticker price for a Simca 8 had risen to 330,000 Francs.

== During the war ==
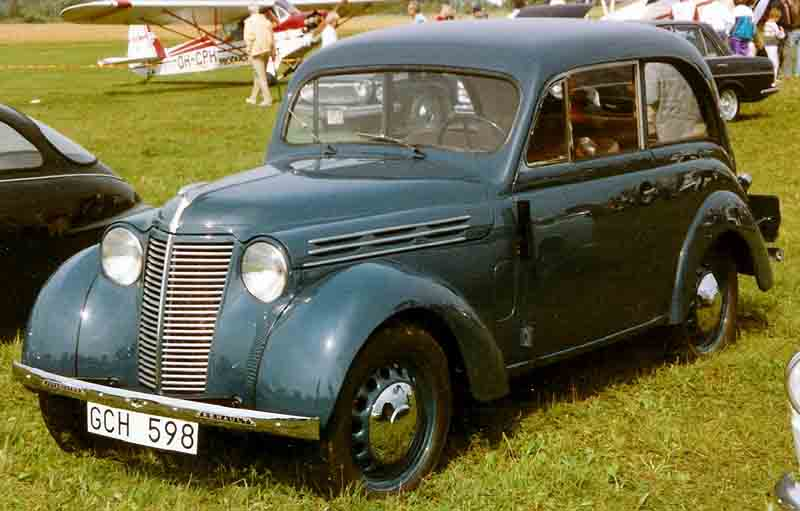
Renault Juvaquatre (1939)

The rate of Juvaquatre production decreased considerably with the onset of World War II, but remained high compared to other European marques who had switched over almost entirely to production of military equipment. After France was taken over by Nazi Germany, Juvaquatre production slowed to a trickle, with only a few hundred cars built in 1941. This is the end of official production (until after the war), but a very small series was still turned out until 1942, and in 1943, 1944, and 1945, the occasional car was assembled for the occupation forces or for French government use.

== After the war ==
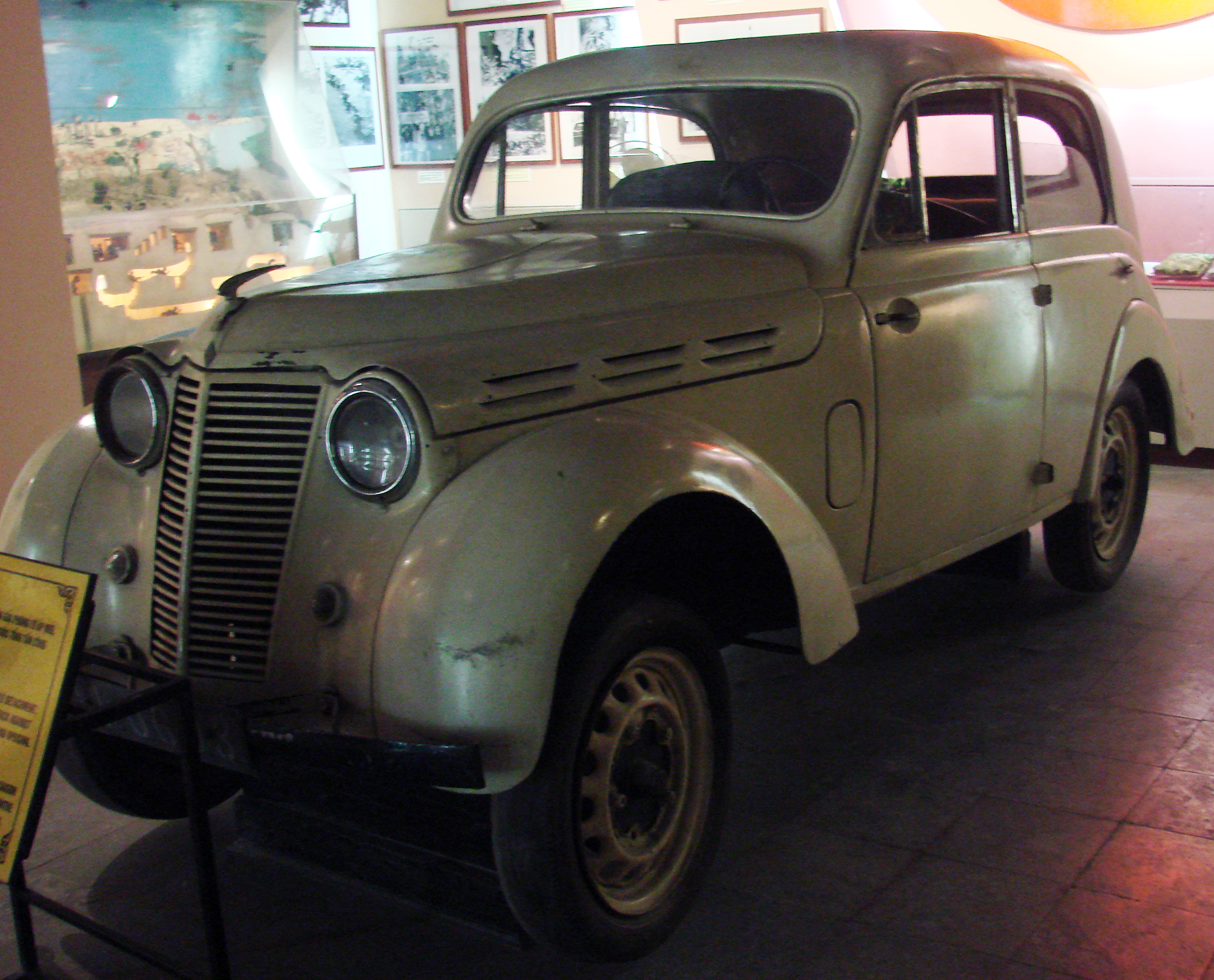
Four-door Juvaquatre, used during the Tet Offensive

Juvaquatre production formally restarted in 1946, with Renault now owned and controlled by the French government. There was no sign of the two-door saloon/sedan "coach" bodied car, the Juvaquatres all now featuring four doors. There was very little to distinguish the first post-war Juvaquatres from the four-door saloon/sedan "berline" bodied version launched in 1939, but from the back there was now an opening hatch (boot/trunk lid) so that it was no longer necessary to clamber over two sets of seats in the passenger cabin in order to access the luggage compartment. The postwar Juvaquatres were produced during years of acute economic stringency, and were almost all earmarked for export.

At Renault's Billancourt plant the emphasis was now on massive investment in tooling for mass production of the new 4CV, soon to become France's top selling car, and at this location production of the Juvaquatre stopped at the end of 1948. A small further batch of saloon/sedan bodied cars was produced during 1951 at the manufacturer's new plant at Flins where the Juvaquatre was the first model to be assembled. Production of the Juvaquatre saloon at Flins finally ended in November 1951.

The "Break Juva 4" (station wagon) remained in production, between 1950 and 1953 retaining the dashboard and side-valve 1,003 cc engine (albeit now enhanced by an air filter) of the prewar cars. From 1956 the old station wagon was fitted with the more modern engine from the Renault Dauphine and found itself rebranded as the Renault Dauphinoise. In the absence of obvious direct competitors, it still sold steadily, with 13,262 produced in 1958 and 9,489 in 1959. The Dauphinoise continued to be listed until 1960, a few months before the appearance of the Renault 4, in its final years sharing its engine with the Renault Dauphine.

== Classification in the French tax and insurance system ==
From the beginning until 1953, the car was classified as 6 CV due to its relatively large displacement of 1003 cc. From 1953 there was only the small engine with 747 cc, which promptly only produced 4 CV. From 1956 onwards, only a station wagon called "Dauphinoise" was offered, but its displacement increased again to 845 cc, which ensured that the car was now considered a 5 CV.
