= Renault Fiftie =

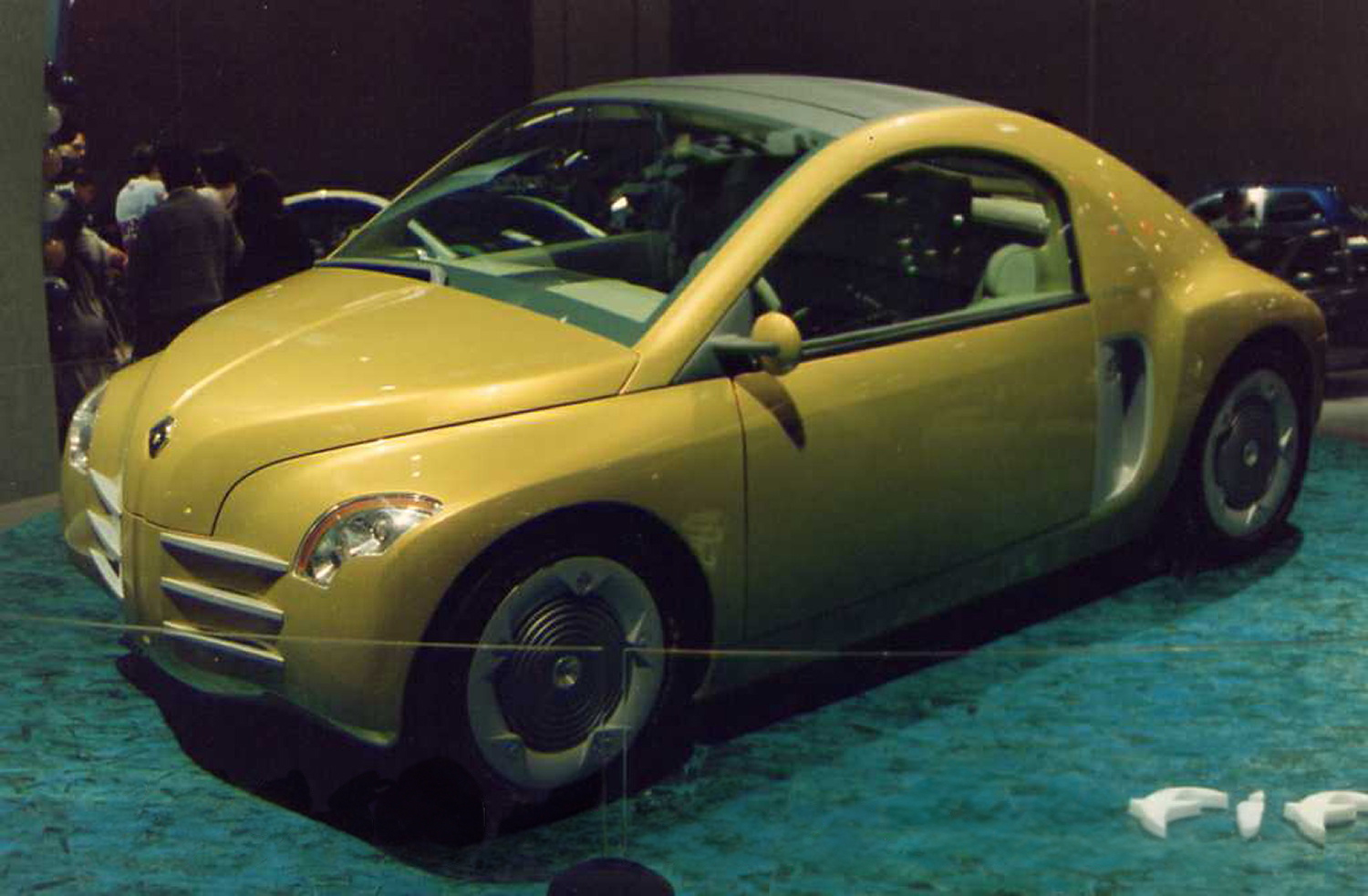

Overview
- Manufacturer: Renault
- Production: 1996
- Designer: Benoît Jacob

Body and chassis
- Class: Concept car
- Body style: 2-door coupe

Powertrain
- Engine: 1.2 L D7F 8-valve I4

Chronology
- Successor: Renault 4 E-Tech

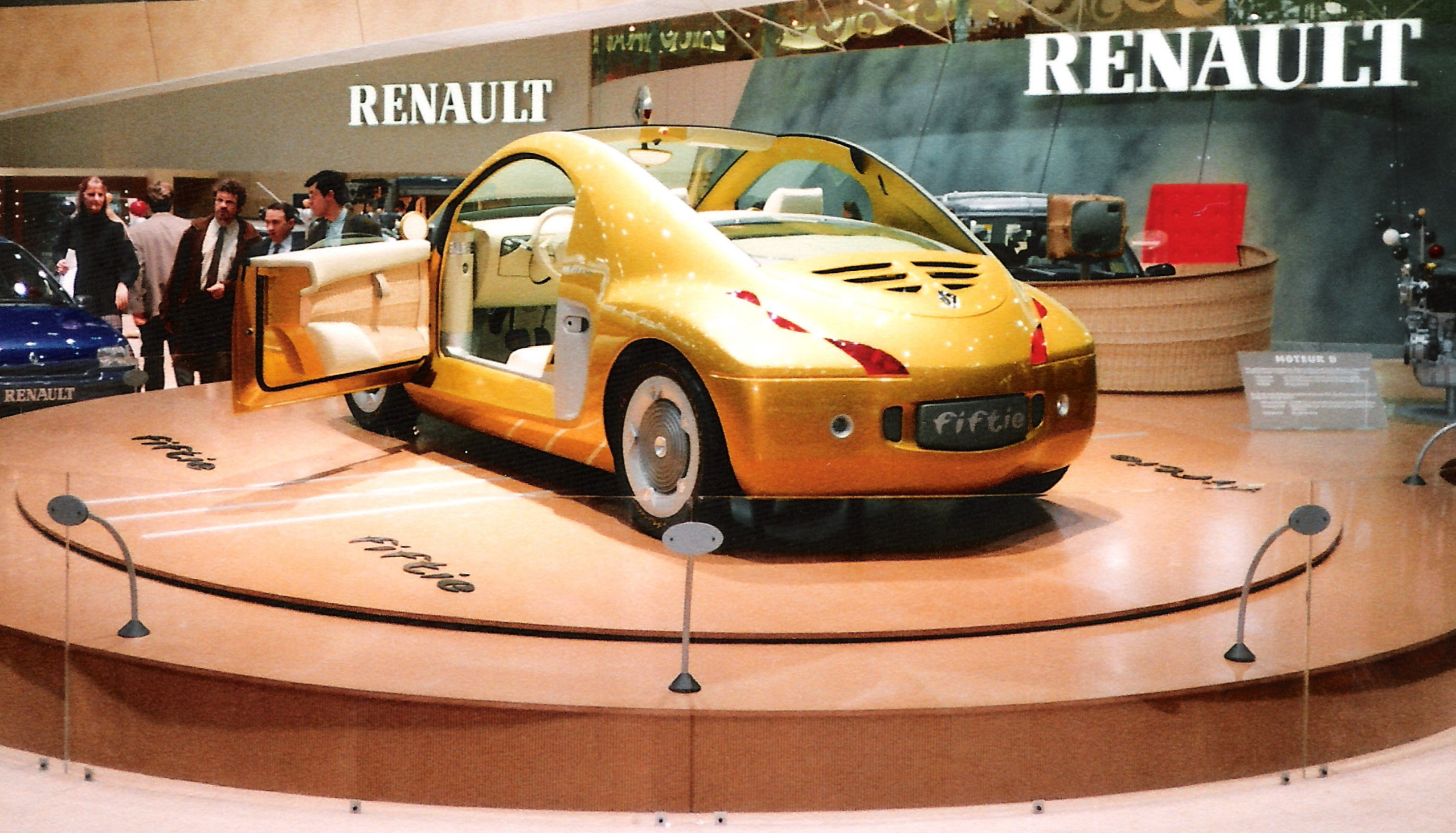
Rear view

The Renault Fiftie was a concept car presented by Renault at the March 1996 Geneva Auto Show to mark the fiftieth anniversary of the launch of the 4CV. The concept used a bright metallic yellow color, honoring the 4CV's "butter pat" nickname.

Styled by Benoît Jacob under the direction of Patrick le Quément, Renault's vice president of corporate design at the time, the Fiftie used a mid-engine/rear-wheel-drive layout, with its exterior styling drew heavily on its ancestor's — though with a two-door, mid-engine configuration rather than the 4CV's four door, rear-engine/rear-drive layout. The Fiftie was part of a trend toward retrospective designs, including the VW New Beetle, Mini Cooper and Fiat 500.

== Overview ==
The Fiftie used an aluminum frame from the Renault Sport Spider and a carbon fiber body. Its interior used cotton, linen, and rattan extensively, with a picnic basket concealed in the boot/trunk. Front styling recalled the horizontal chrome 'mustache bars' of the original 4CV, with the addition of distinctive apostrophe-shaped headlights. The targa-style roof used four removable roof panels that could store beneath the flat-folding rear window.

The Fiftie was fully roadworthy, sharing most of the Renault Sport Spider's chassis, suspension, and mechanics as well as Renault's D7F 1.2-liter, 8-valve four-cylinder engine, which was subsequently introduced as a production engine in the Twingo.

After introducing the Fiftie, Renault chose not to develop the concept further.
