= Renault Celtaquatre =

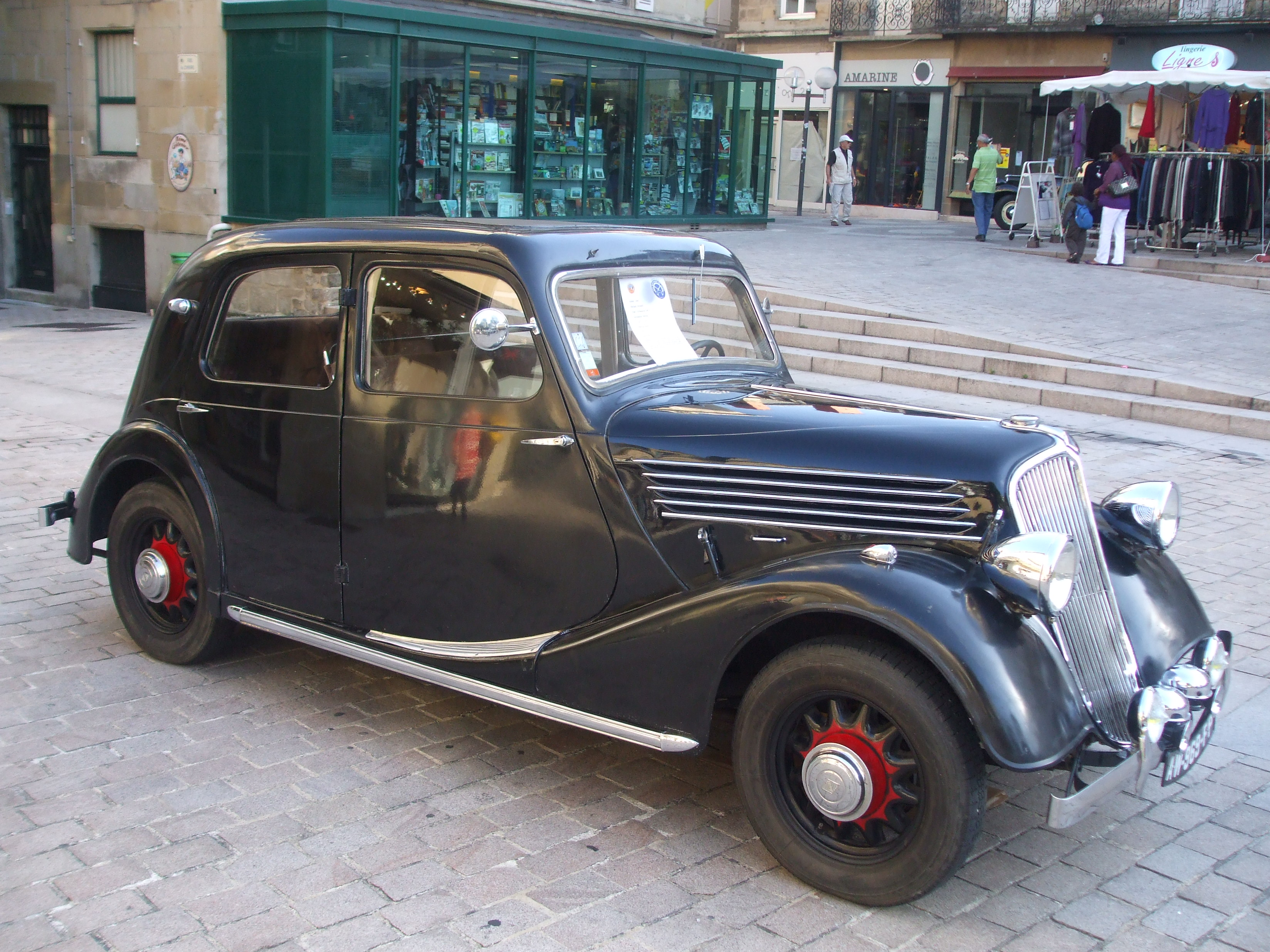
- 1936 Renault Celtaquatre (ADC1)

Overview
- Manufacturer: Renault
- Also called: Renault Celtaboule
- Production: 1934–1938
- Assembly: France: Île Seguin, Boulogne-Billancourt, Paris

Body and chassis
- Class: Small family car (C)
- Body style: 2-door cabriolet 4-door saloon 2-door coupé
- Layout: FR layout
- Platform: Renault Primaquatre
- Related: Renault Primaquatre

Powertrain
- Engine: 1463 cc 8CV straight-4
- Transmission: 3-speed manual

Dimensions
- Length: 3,860 mm (152.0 in) /4,020 mm (158.3 in)
- Width: 1,510 mm (59.4 in)
- Height: 1,590 mm (62.6 in)
- Curb weight: 1,150 kg (2,535 lb)

Chronology
- Predecessor: Renault Monaquatre
- Successor: Renault Juvaquatre

The Renault Celtaquatre is a small family car produced by the French manufacturer Renault between 1934 and 1938. Although French, it took some of its styling cues from American cars of the time. Its rounded silhouette gave it the nickname “Celtaboule” ("Celtaball").

== Details and evolution ==
The Celtaquatre was presented to the public in April 1934 and entered production a month later. Its arrival coincided with that of Citroën's Traction Avant, and the Renault's launch was overshadowed by Citroën's powerful publicity machine.

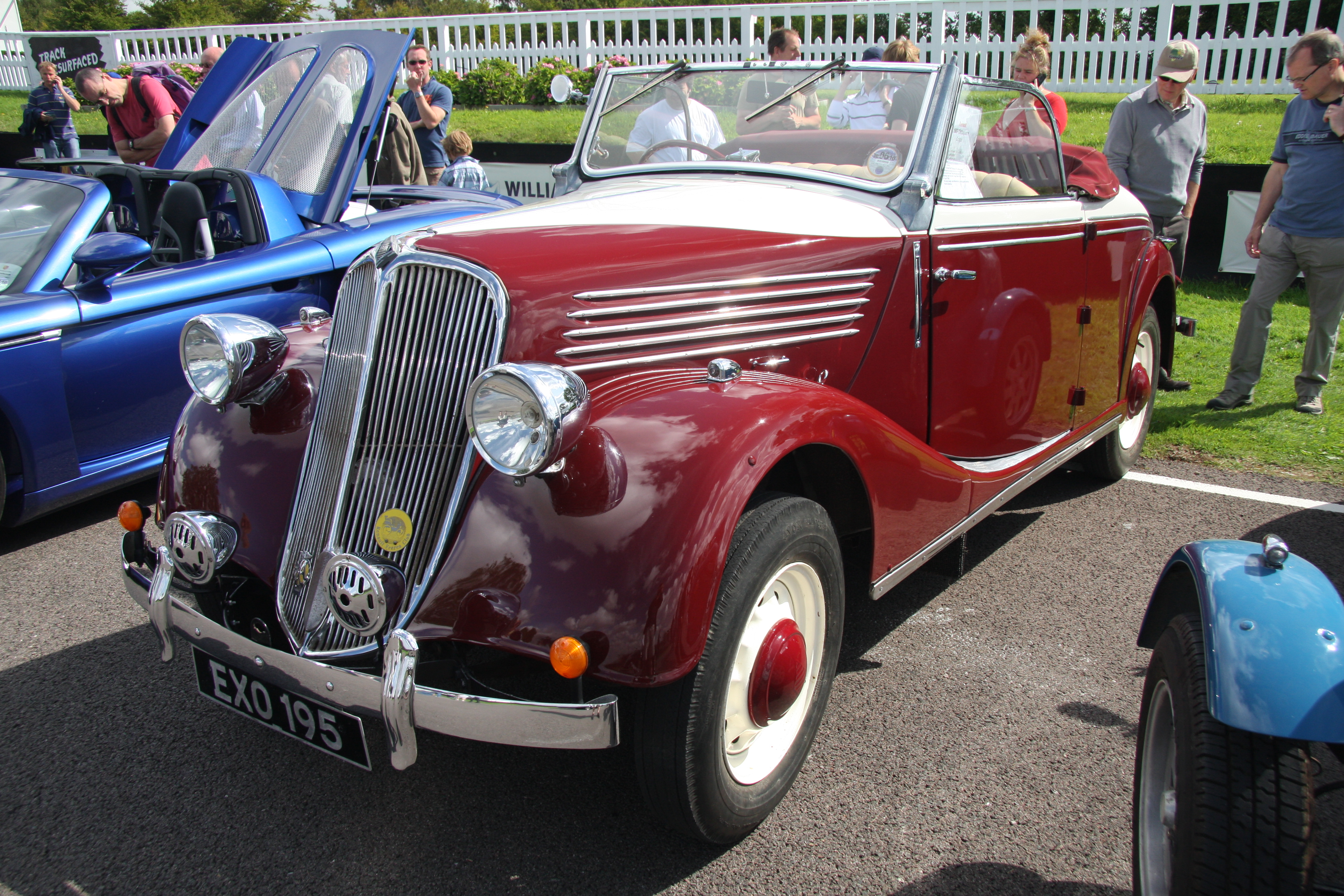
1937 Renault Celtaquatre cabriolet

The car was powered by a four-cylinder 1463 cc (Note: bore × stroke of 70×95 mm) side-valve engine, for which a maximum of 25 kW (34 hp) at 3,500 rpm was claimed. Power passed to the rear wheels via a classic three speed transmission. The suspension was based on rigid axles front and back, which was seen as a rather minimalist at a time when competitor vehicles from volume automakers such as the Peugeot 301 were being delivered with independent front suspension. However, the 8CV Celtaquatre was also much more aggressively priced than the 8CV 301: At the Paris Motor Show in October the list price for a Celtaquatre with a standard "berline" (saloon) body was given as ₣16,900 francs, while the Peugeot 301 "berline normale" was priced at ₣20,500 francs.

In 1935, adjustments were made to the bonnet, with horizontal chrome-lined openings in place of the earlier three shutters. Two-tone paintwork was standard. A supplement of ₣400 francs was required for a single colour.

In 1936, the Celtaquatre lost its roundness to acquire a more aerodynamic shape. Appearance of two new body types: a Cabriolet and a Coupé Cabriolet. In 1937, the Celtaquatre received an American-inspired V-shaped grille which was retained throughout the rest of the model's production.

In 1938, a new bumper design appeared with straight slats. The coupé was discontinued.

In 1939, after production of 44,000 units, the Celtaquatre was replaced by the Juvaquatre.

By 1940, most of the Celtaquatre cars remaining in stock were delivered to the French Army.

In July 1941, the last 13 Celtaquatre cars were transformed into a small series of Novaquatre.

== Specifications ==
- Consumption: 8 liters per 100 km
- Speed: 100 km/h (62 mph)
- Power: 22 kW (30 hp) (8 CV)
- Brakes: cable-actuated drums front and rear
- Battery: 6 V

== Types ==
- ZR1
- ZR2
- AEC1 (led commercial)
- ADC1
- ADC2
- ADC3
- BCR

== Classification in the French tax and insurance system ==
The car was taxed at 8 CV.
