= Procédure Renault =

The "Procédure Renault" is a term referring to a Belgian Labour law of 13 February 1998 related to collective redundancies. It foresees a legally mandatory consultation period when an employer intends to proceed with a collective redundancy, as well as specific termination indemnity. The term has its origins in a controversial mass layoff in 1997 at a Renault's Vilvoorde factory. The relevant law published in Belgian official journal on 19 February 1998 is commonly known as the "loi Renault" ('Renault law'), "Procédure Renault" or "Plan Renault".

== History ==
In 1997 Renault announced the closure of its Vilvoorde factory with the loss of 3,097 jobs. The job losses were announced without any prior consultation or warning. The announcement caused a 20% rise in the company's share price, but caused substantially negative labour relations issues, including strikes and other actions at a Belgian and European level in support of the affected workers.

The term arose following the closure of Renault's factory in 1997. Due to the controversial nature of the closure the Belgian government empowered the Conseil National du Travail/Nationale Arbeidsraad (CNT/NAR) to report on the consultation procedure. Subsequently, on the recommendation of the CNT a law, known as the loi Renault ('Renault law') was passed on 13 Feb 1998. The law added additional requirements in addition to two existing laws of 1975–6 on necessary procedures when a company makes collective redundancies.

== Scope of the law ==
The law applies to employers of the private sector, who intends to proceed with a collective redundancy defined as such:

- Employers with 20 to less than 100 workers, dismissal of at least 10 workers,
- Employers with 100 to less than 300 people, dismissal of 10% of the workforce,
- Employers with more than 300 people, dismissal of at least 30 workers.

By workers, is referred to persons bound by an employment contract in Belgium.

The law requires the employer to inform and consult the workers on such redundancies, with reference to the rationale for the redundancies, and the selection criteria for those made redundant. Additionally the employer is required to listen to and respond to all of the employees' questions on the redundancies.

The law includes mass layoffs but excludes bankruptcies, which results from a judicial decision.

== Recent cases ==
Since enactment the term Procédure Renault has been used in the Belgian media to refer to the consultation between workers and employers prior to mass redundancies. For example, in reference to: end of primary steel production at ArcelorMittal Liège (2013); end of coke and blast furnace work at Carsid (Marchienne-au-Pont, 2012); partial closure and cutbacks at the former Duferco La Louvière steel plant (2012); redundancies at aerospace firm SONACA (2009); redundancies at Ford's Genk motor plant (2012); and at the Caterpillar Inc plant in Gosselies (2012). Although originally designed to support mass lay offs in big production plants, also other businesses like TomTom in 2022, have to follow the Procédure Renault. The Federal Public Service Employment publishes quarterly statistics on the use of the "Renault Law".

== See also ==
- Collective Redundancies Directive 1998
- Redundancy in United Kingdom law and Compromise agreement
- Layoff
