= Renault Monaquatre =

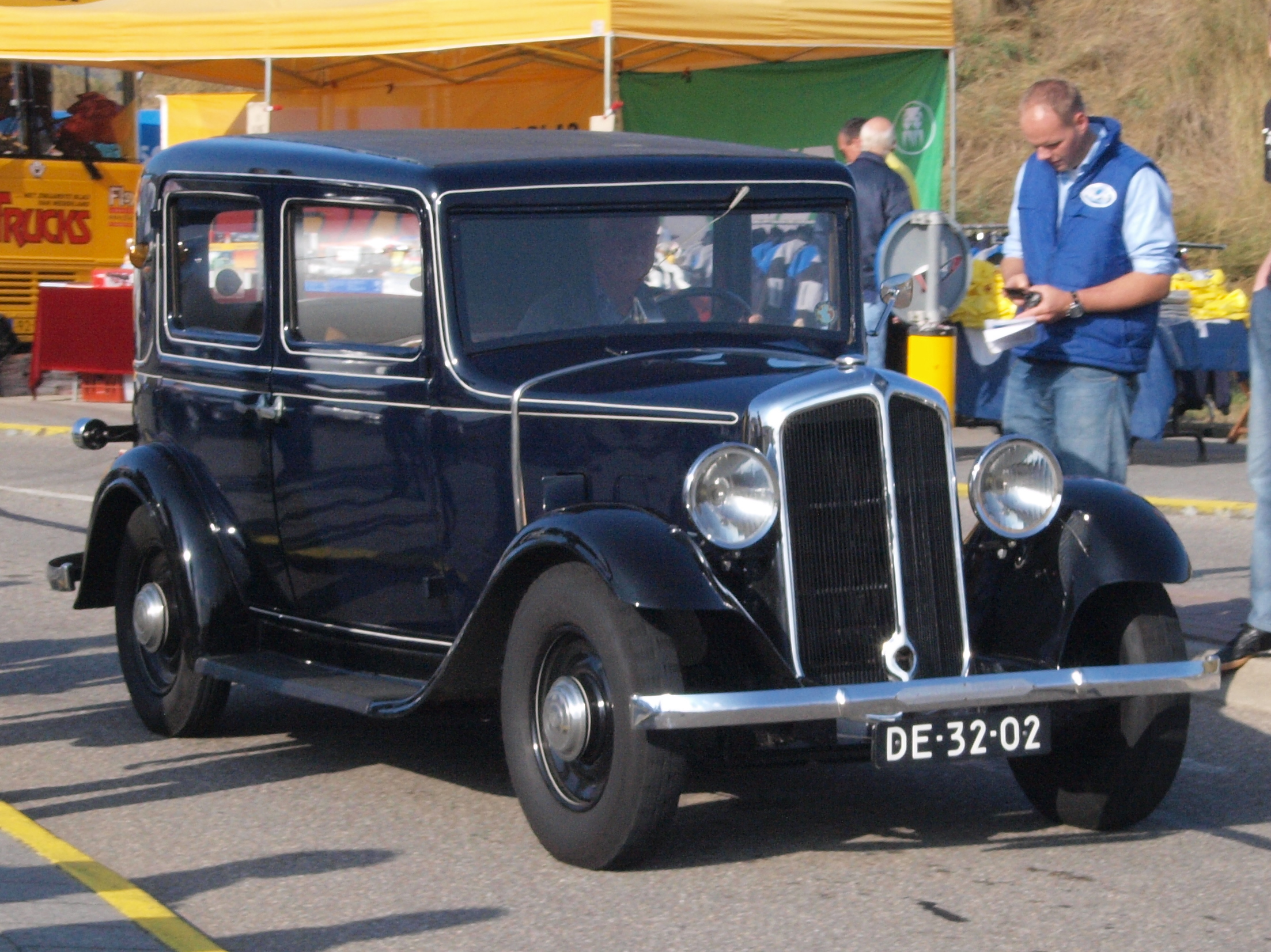

Overview
- Manufacturer: Renault
- Production: 1931–1936
- Assembly: France: Île Seguin, Boulogne-Billancourt; Belgium: Haren-Vilvoorde (RIB)
- Designer: Louis Renault

Body and chassis
- Class: Small family car (C)
- Body style: 2-door saloon 4-door saloon
- Layout: FR layout

Powertrain
- Engine: 1289 cc I4, 19 kW (25 hp), 7 CV; 1463 cc I4, 22 kW (30 hp), 8 CV; 2120 cc I4, 26 kW (35 hp), 9 CV
- Transmission: 3-speed manual

Dimensions
- Wheelbase: 2,650 mm (104.3 in)
- Length: 3,900 mm (153.5 in)
- Width: 1,570 mm (61.8 in)
- Curb weight: 900–950 kg (1,984–2,094 lb)

Chronology
- Predecessor: Renault Monasix
- Successor: Renault Celtaquatre

The Renault Monaquatre (Type UY1) was a small family car assembled by Renault between 1931 and 1936. It used a conventional front-engine, rear-wheel-drive configuration and was powered by a four-cylinder water-cooled engine.

== Details and Evolutions ==
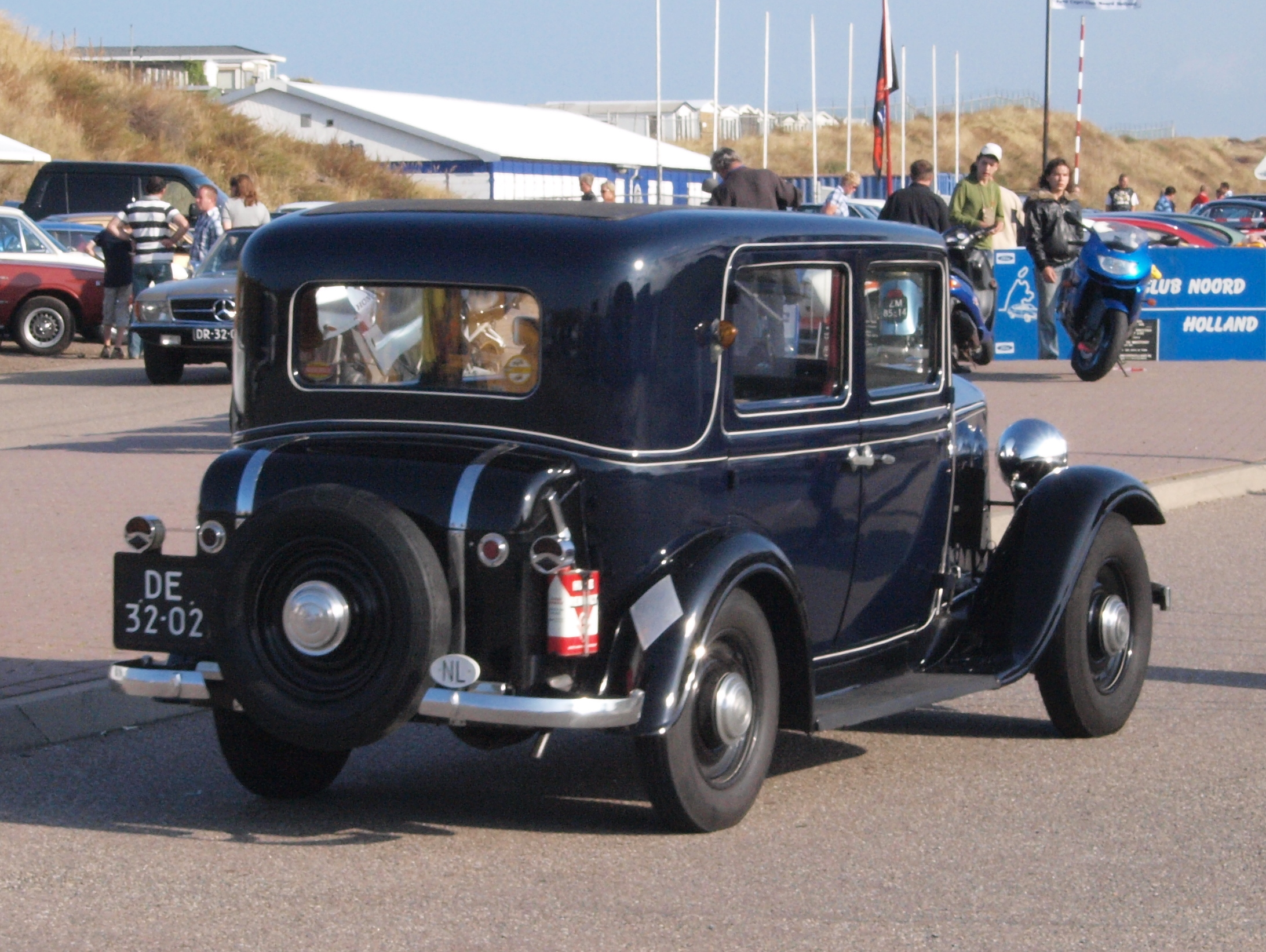

Launched in October 1931, the Monaquatre was similar in design to Renault Primaquatre large family car with which it shared its 2,650 mm (104.3 in) wheelbase.

At the 1932 Paris Motor Show the new Type YN1 version appeared, the engine size increased from 1289 cc to 1463 cc.

In October 1933 the type YN2 appeared at the Paris Motor Show, featuring a redesigned bonnet, the angle of the radiator grille being now a little more raked. The YN2 was a transitional model, the manufacturer having already decided to fit "aérodynamique" bodies with fashionably sloping tails replacing the very vertical rear ends of the existing cars. By this time the Monaquatre was offered a choice from seven different body types, including 4-door berlines with four or six side windows and, at the top in terms of price, a 2-door 2-seat cabriolet.

The YN2 was produced for only three months before the new more aerodynamic Type YN3 appeared at the start of 1934, initially with just two body styles from which to choose.

In September 1935 the production of the final version, the Type YN4, ceased like models 1936 Type YN4. The Monaquatre was replaced by the Renault Celtaquatre.

== Types ==
- UY1
- YN1
- YN2
- YN3
- YN4
- Boulangère

== Characteristics ==
- Speed: 85 km/h (53 mph)
- Power: 19 kW (25 hp) (7CV), 22 kW (30 hp) (8 CV), 26 kW (35 hp) (9CV)
- Brakes: with cables on drums Front and Rear.
- Battery: 6 V
