= Vilvoorde Renault Factory =

Coordinates: 50.91306°N 4.42028°E

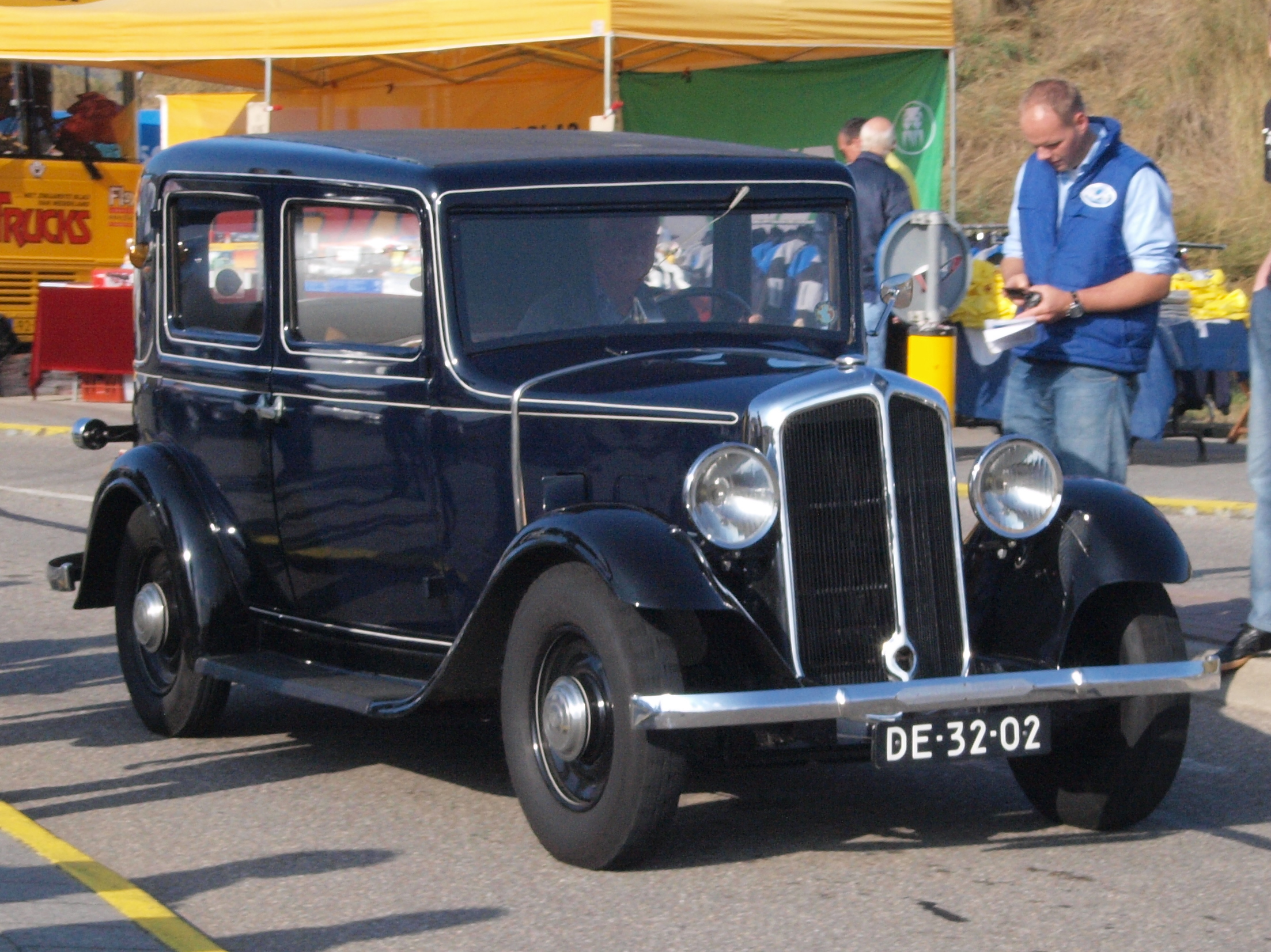
The Renault Monaquatre was assembled at Vilvoorde between 1931 and 1933.

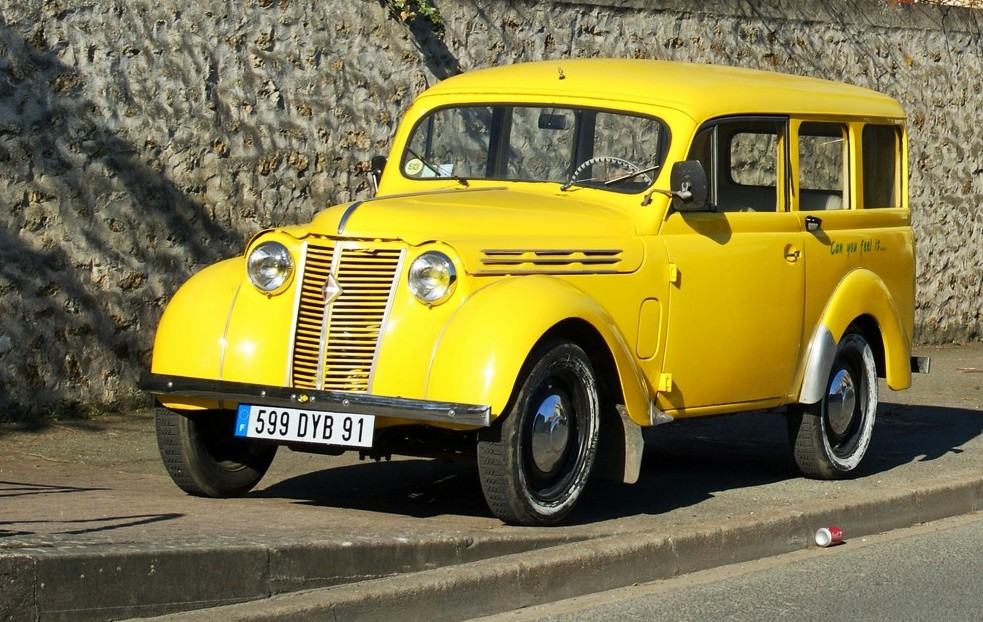
Although the saloon/sedan version of the Renault Juvaquatre was phased out in the early 1950s, the estate version, badged as the Renault Dauphinoise, continued in production at Vilvoorde till 1960.

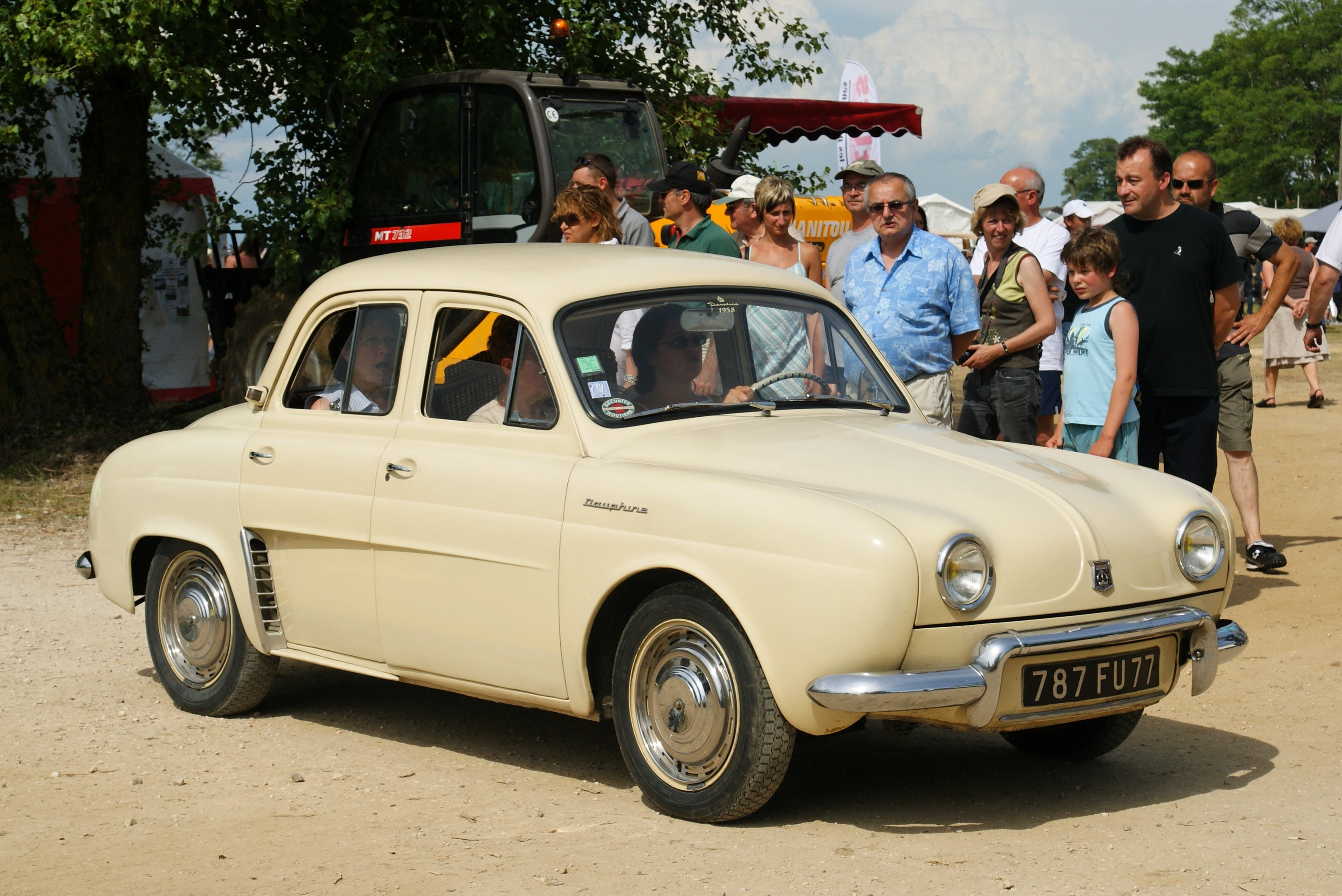
The first postwar design to be assembled at Vilvoorde was the Renault Dauphine.

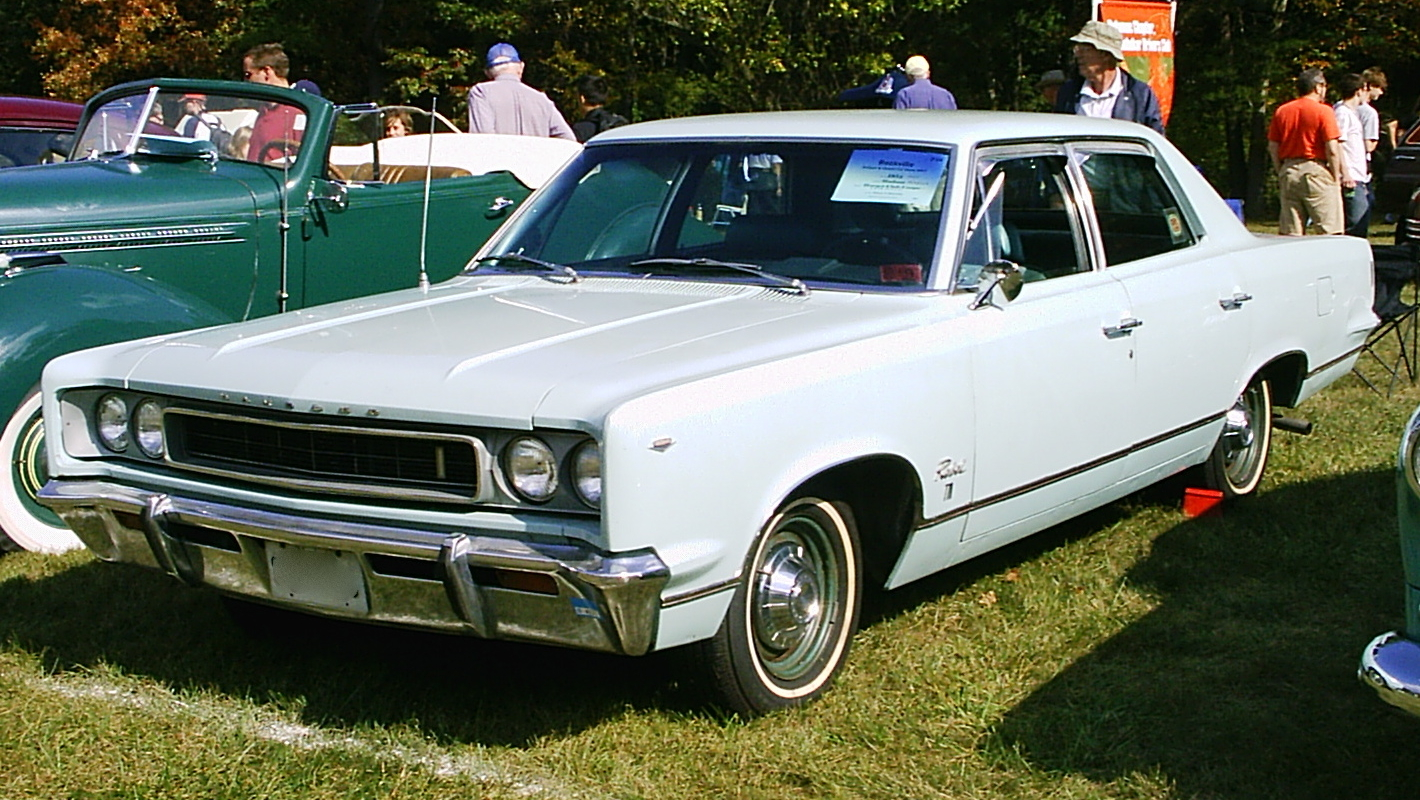
Ramblers were assembled at Vilvoorde between 1962 and 1971.

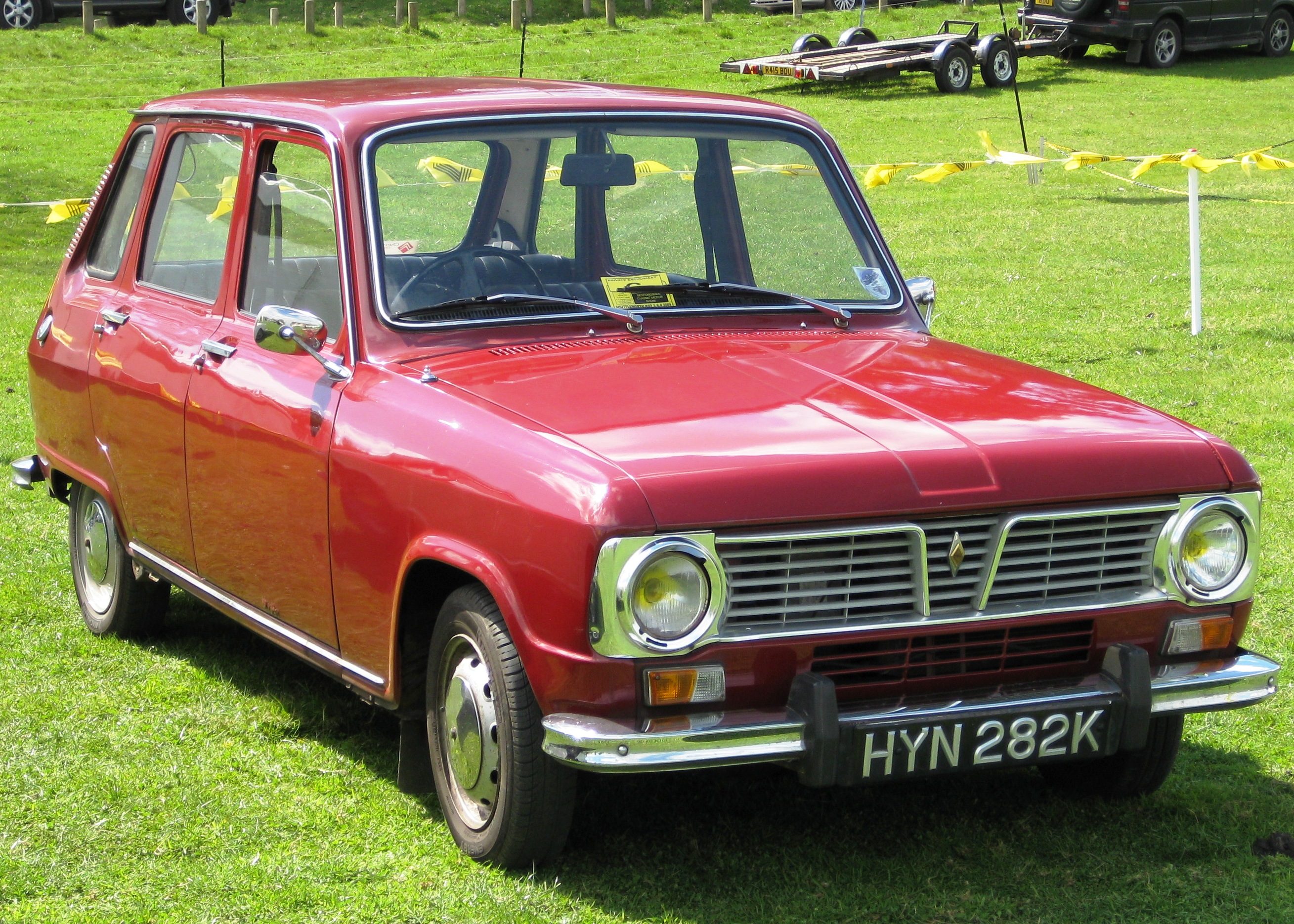
Vilvoorde assembled the Renault 6 between 1968 and 1980.

Renault Industrie Belgique S.A. / Renault Industrie België N.V., officially shortened with the acronym RIB, opened in 1931 as an auto-assembly plant owned and operated by Renault in Vilvoorde on the northern edge of Brussels in Belgium. It was the manufacturer's first plant to be located outside France.

Automobile production at Vilvoorde came to an abrupt end in 1997, with the loss of approximately 3,500 jobs, and in the face of much public opposition from and on behalf of those affected.

== History ==
=== Origins ===
Production began in 1931, the plant's first year of operation, although at this stage only a few thousand cars per year were made. The models in question were the manufacturer's Monaquatre and Primaquatre. The plant's first volume model, introduced in the late 1930s and still assembled at Vilvoorde until 1955, was the Renault Juvaquatre, which competed in a hotly contested market segment against cars such as the Peugeot 202 and the Opel Kadett. Production of the estate version of the Juvaquatre, badged as the Renault Dauphinoise, continued until 1960. In the meantime a second volume model, the new rear engine Renault Dauphine was added to the lines. By 1960, Vilvoorde had become very much more than an assembly operation, producing its own axle components, exhaust systems and body panels.

=== Boom years ===
At the start of the 1960s, the old Dauphinoise was finally taken out of production, to be replaced on the Belgian production line by the much more modern Renault R4 (later rebranded as the Renault 4). In 1962, Renault installed a third production line which was used to assemble the Rambler-Renault Classic. This arrangement was one of a huge campaign led by the international marketing manager of American Motors (AMC), Roy D. Chapin Jr. during the 1960s to expand AMC's international operations. (This arrangement would have lasting consequences decades later when AMC was ultimately acquired by Renault in the late 1970s.) In 1967, the Classic was replaced at the Vilvoorde plant with the Rambler-Renault Rebel. In volume terms, however, the Renault designed models outnumbered the Rambler designs, with overall production in the late 1960s, running at around 100,000 cars annually. By that time, the Dauphine had been taken out of production, to be replaced on the Vilvoorde lines with the Renault 6.

Production of Ramblers ceased in 1967, and the Rambler line at the factory was repurposed for production of the Renault R12.

The 1973 oil crisis triggered large fuel price rises which gave Renault, with a range of relatively small and economical cars, an enormous competitive advantage. The Renault 12 remained in production until 1976, to be replaced in the Belgian assembled range by the Renault 14.

During the 1980s, output was dominated by smaller models, including the Renault 5 Turbo. A mid-sized model returned to Vilvoorde in 1986 with the arrival of the Renault 21. Other models produced at Renault's Belgian plant in the 1990s included the small Clio and the compact Mégane models.

=== The end of auto-assembly at Vilvoorde and the loi Renault ===
The ending of auto-assembly at Vilvoorde in 1997 caused the loss of around 3,500 jobs, along with strikes, street protests and political disputes. Adverse publicity included a 1999 film by Jan Bucquoy entitled “Fermeture de l'usine Renault à Vilvoorde” (Closure of the Renault factory at Vilvoorde). In this fictional work Renault chairman Louis Schweitzer, who had taken a high-profile role in the plant closure, is kidnapped for purposes of blackmail, and later murdered. In real life Schweitzer remained unkidnapped and at the helm of Renault till 2005 and passed away in 2025.

The action led to a law being enacted in 1998 known as the loi Renault, dealing with necessary consultation procedures on mass redundancies. As a consequence, the term Procédure Renault is now in common usage by the Belgian media as a synonym for "redundancy consultation" or similar terms.

Following the high-profile end to auto-production, the plant was modernised and is again functioning, but only for the production of car-components. Approximately 500 workers are employed in 2013.

== Identification number ==
Cars produced at the Renault Vilvoorde plant can be identified from the Vehicle Identification Number, in which the eleventh position on the Vilvoorde cars is taken by the letter “H”.
