= Renault Primaquatre =

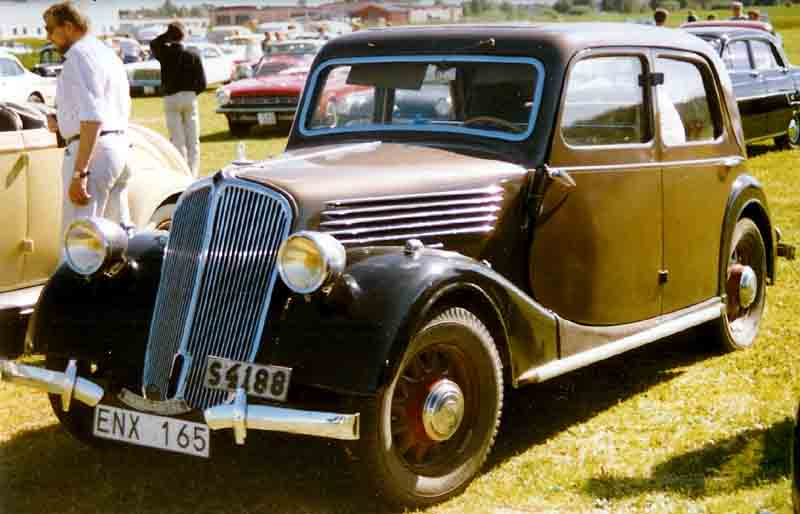

Overview
- Manufacturer: Renault
- Also called: Renault Type KZ
- Production: 1931–1941
- Assembly: France: Île Seguin, Boulogne-Billancourt, Paris; Belgium: Haren-Vilvoorde (RIB)
- Designer: Louis Renault

Body and chassis
- Class: Mid-size / Large family car (D)
- Body style: 4-door sedan 2-door convertible
- Layout: FR layout
- Related: Renault Novaquatre; Renault Primastella

Powertrain
- Engine: I4 2120 cc, 35 hp (26 kW) (1931); I4 2383 cc, 48 hp (36 kW) (1936); I4 2383 cc, 52 hp (39 kW) (1938); I4 2383 cc, 56 hp (42 kW)
- Transmission: 3-speed manual

Dimensions
- Length: (KZ-6/8) 3,700 mm (145.7 in) (KZ-10) 3,900 mm (153.5 in) (KZ-18) 4,000 mm (157.5 in) (KZ-24) 4,150 mm (163.4 in) (KZ-11) 4,300 mm (169.3 in)
- Width: (KZ-6/8) 1,450 mm (57.1 in) (KZ-10) 1,570 mm (61.8 in) (KZ-18) 1,575 mm (62.0 in) (KZ-24) 1,600 mm (63.0 in) (KZ-11) 1,770 mm (69.7 in)
- Height: (KZ-11) 1,710 mm (67.3 in)
- Curb weight: 1,550 kg (3,417 lb)

Chronology
- Predecessor: Renault KZ
- Successor: Renault Colorale; Renault Frégate

First Generation

Overview
- Production: 1931–1935

Body and chassis
- Class: Mid-size / Large family car (D)
- Body style: 4-door sedan 2-door convertible
- Related: Renault Primastella

Powertrain
- Engine: I4 2120 cc, 35 hp (26 kW)
- Transmission: 3-speed manual

Second Generation

Overview
- Production: 1936–1941

Body and chassis
- Class: Mid-size / Large family car (D)
- Body style: 4-door Sedan; 2-door convertible
- Related: Renault Novaquatre

Powertrain
- Engine: I4 2383 cc, 48 hp (36 kW) (1936); I4 2383 cc, 62 hp (46 kW) (1938); I4 2383 cc, 56 hp (42 kW)
- Transmission: 3-speed manual

The Renault Primaquatre is an automobile produced from 1931 to 1941 by Renault. It was the last car built before Louis Renault's death in 1944.

== First Generation ==
The Primaquatre was first exhibited on 29 December 1930 as the Type KZ6, being a development from to the KZ series. Its 4-cylinder engine was of 2120 cc providing a published maximum output of 35 horsepower (26 kW) at 2900 rpm. The claimed maximum speed was 100 km/h (62 mph). The rear wheels were driven via an unsynchronised 3-speed manual transmission.

- In 1932 arrived the new model Type KZ8 more width to difference of the Renault Monaquatre.
- In 1933 appeared the Type KZ10 larger from 3,700 mm (145.7 in) to 3,900 mm (153.5 in), with an engine more powerful.
- In 1933 the KZ11 appeared, was a taxis G7 company, a special series of 2400 vehicles with new adaptations.
- In 1934 arrived the Type KZ18 larger than 4,000 mm (157.5 in).
- In 1935 arrived the Type KZ24 with 4,150 mm (163.4 in) of large and 1,600 mm (63.0 in) of width.

== Second generation ==
In January 1936 the New Primaquatre (Type ACL1) appeared, featuring with a new 2383 cc (14CV) engine providing up to 48 PS (35 kW; 47 hp) at 3200 rpm.

In following years the types ACL2, BDF1, BDF2 and BDS1 were introduced, and were produced until the early summer of 1940 when the unexpected speed of the German invasion put an end to most passenger car production in France. Two changes towards the end of 1937 were the introduction of Renault's newly developed mechanical brake servo, as well as the removal of one of the two access points for the fuel tank which from now on had to be filled using a single fuel filler on the right hand side of the rear panel.

The last Primaquatre was the Primaquatre Sport (Type BDS2) with the 2.4-litre engine, but with 56 PS (41 kW; 55 hp), type BDF2 receive the engine too of 62 PS (46 kW; 61 hp). One final technical enhancement came in 1940 when Lockheed hydraulic brakes replaced the cable brakes specified for the original design.

== Types ==
First generation:

- KZ6
- KZ8
- KZ10
- KZ11
- KZ18
- KZ24

Second generation:

- ACL1
- ACL2
- BDF1
- BDF2
- BDS1
- BDS2

== Characteristics ==
- Speed: 120 km/h (75 mph)
- Power: 35 hp (26 kW), 48 hp (36 kW), 56 hp (42 kW), 62 hp (46 kW)
- Brakes: with cables on drums AV and AR
- Battery: 6 V
