= Fernand Picard (engineer) =

French engineer (1906–1993)

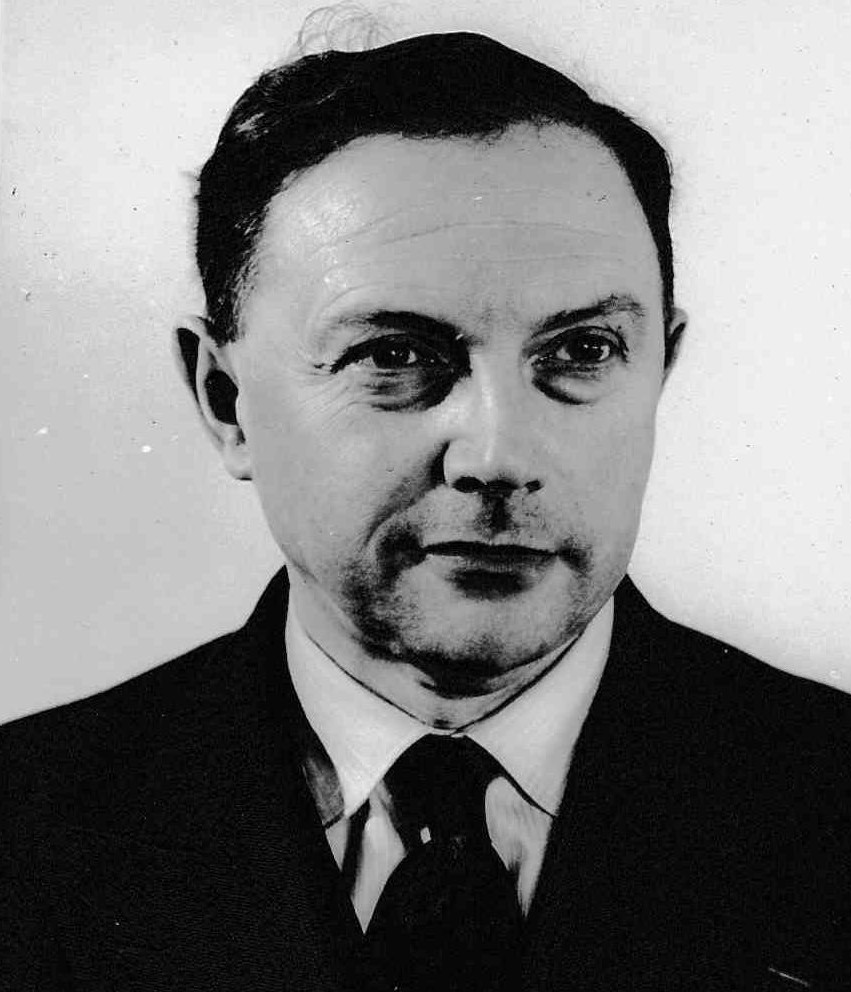
- Born: 21 February 1906; France
- Died: 21 November 1993 (aged 87); France
- Occupation: Automotive engineer
- Years active: 1930s–1960s
- Employer: Renault
- Known for: Chief designer of the Renault 4CV and Renault Dauphine
- Notable work: Renault 4CV; Renault Dauphine
- Title: Technical Director, Renault

Fernand Picard (21 February 1906 – 21 November 1993) was a French automotive engineer who served as a design and research director at Renault. He is best known for leading the design of the post-World War II Renault 4CV and its successor, the Renault Dauphine, both hugely successful cars that helped mobilize France in the 1940s and 1950s.

== Early life and education ==
Picard was born on 21 February 1906 in Chennevières-sur-Marne, France. In 1923, he entered the École Nationale Supérieure d'Arts et Métiers in Lille, where he trained as a mechanical engineer. He graduated in 1927 with an engineering degree.

== Career ==
=== Early career at Delage and Renault ===
After finishing his studies, Picard began his career at luxury carmaker Delage as a design draftsman in the tooling department. In 1935, he joined the engineering staff of Renault, which was then under the direction of Louis Renault. Picard initially worked as a special test engineer, focusing on engine development and testing of new models. His technical skill was soon recognized after he resolved a major problem on a 300-horsepower diesel engine, a success that boosted his reputation within the company.

In June 1940, with World War II underway and France under German occupation, Louis Renault promoted Picard to deputy technical director in the automobile engines department. During the German occupation of France, he and a small team of Renault engineers began secretly developing a small, economical car for the post-war era, defying orders that Renault focus only on trucks and military vehicles. The team worked covertly at Renault's Billancourt plant, with Picard quietly building and testing several prototype mini-cars under the nose of the occupiers. One of these prototypes was even driven on the streets of Paris by Louis Renault's wife, Christiane, as a way to test it discreetly; the car was code-named "the 750" (for its engine size) and later would become the Renault 4CV.

By 1942, Picard's team had completed a 760 cc inline-4 engine (named "Billancourt engine"), and by 1943 the first prototype was running trials in secret. After the Liberation of France in 1944, the company's leadership changed – Louis Renault died in October 1944 while in custody for collaboration, and in early 1945 the Renault factories were nationalized to form the Régie Nationale des Usines Renault. Pierre Lefaucheux, appointed as Renault's new chairman, discovered Picard's hidden small-car project and fully endorsed it.

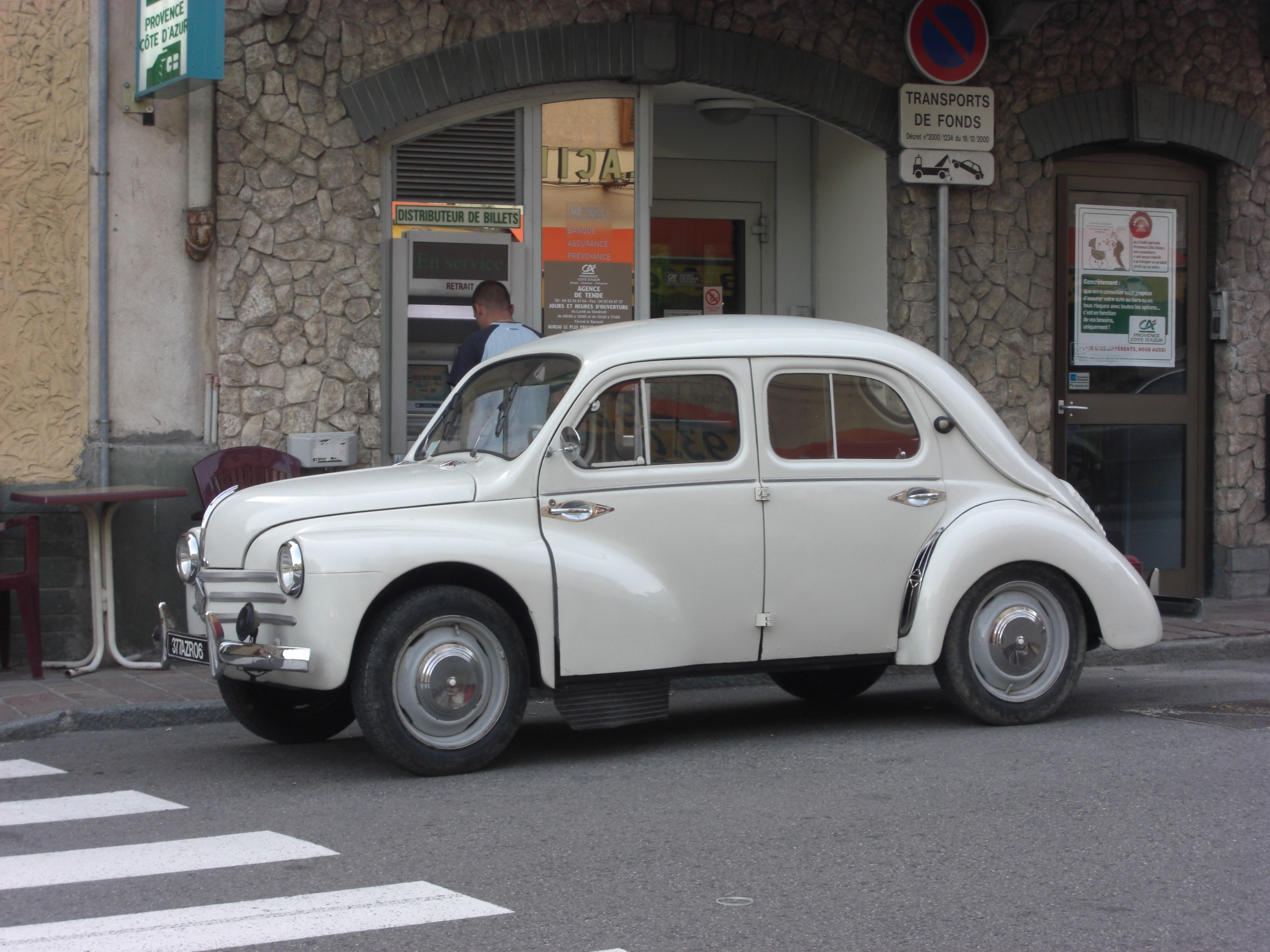
Renault 4CV

=== Designing the Renault 4CV ===
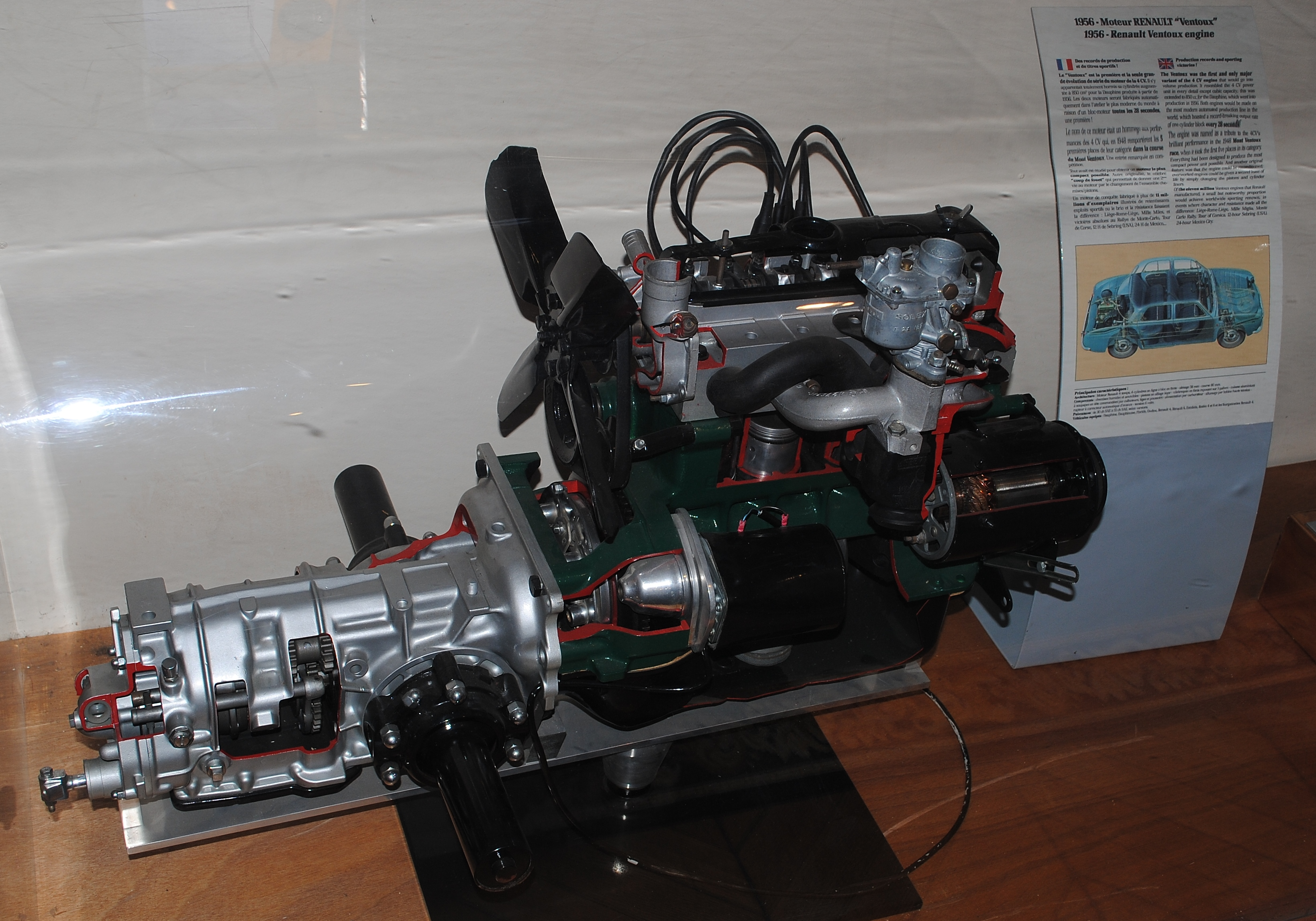
Renault Ventoux engine

Under Lefaucheux's backing, Picard's prototype was quickly refined from its wartime origins into a production-ready vehicle. Serving as Renault's Director of Engineering Studies, Picard oversaw the final development and testing of the Renault 4CV. In late 1945, Ferdinand Porsche was invited by French officials to inspect Renault's car design.

The Renault 4CV was officially unveiled to the public at the Paris Motor Show in October 1946 – the first post-war auto salon. The car entered production in August 1947 at Renault's Billancourt factory. Picard's design featured a rear-mounted 760 cc engine (renamed the "Ventoux"), producing about 17–21 hp, with a distinctive rear-engine, rear-wheel-drive layout. Initially available in only one color (pale yellow, using surplus paint from the German Afrika Korps stock. It was light (about 565 kg), and could achieve 100 km/h (62 mph). The 4CV became the first French car to sell over a million units, with ultimately over 1.1 million produced from 1947 to 1961.

=== Developing the Renault Dauphine ===
By 1946, Picard was officially named Director of Studies (head of the design and engineering bureau) at RNUR. In May 1951, he was promoted to Director of Studies and Research at Renault. Around this time, Picard not only began work on Renault Dauphine but also led an advanced engineering project to develop a high-powered diesel engine for the French National Railways. In 1952, a new 1,000 hp diesel engine developed under his supervision was successfully tested on the Paris–Granville.

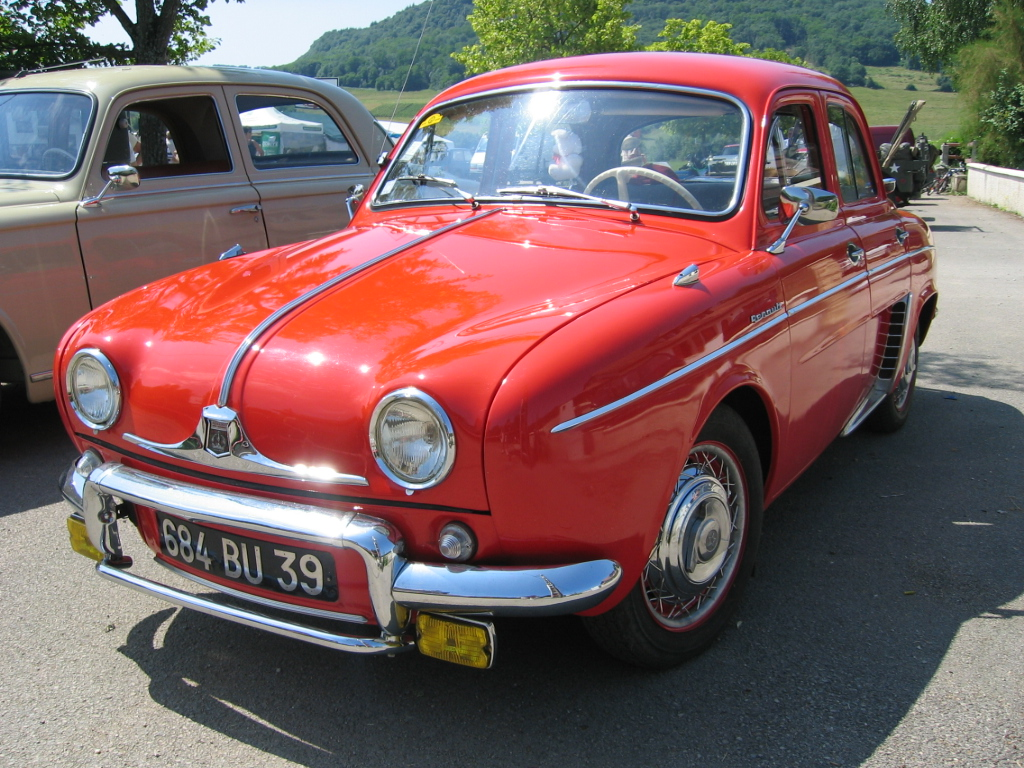
Renault Dauphine

The idea for what became the Renault Dauphine was born from conversations between Picard and Renault's chairman Pierre Lefaucheux as they anticipated the evolving needs of consumers in a more prosperous, mid-1950s France. Both men agreed that while the 4CV was successful, French buyers' rising living standards would soon call for a car that was a step up – a small family car with more space, better performance, and more refined styling, yet still affordable.

Picard assembled a "crack team" of engineers for the new project, internally code-named "Project 109". Development began in 1949 and was to last five years in utmost secrecy. Picard laid out strict specifications: the new model needed a top speed of at least 110 km/h (68 mph), seating for four adults, and even an array of bright exterior colors to appeal to the increasingly style-conscious public. To maintain secrecy, Picard's team conducted road tests only at night. Prototype Dauphines were often driven under cover of darkness at Renault's facilities and on remote roads to prevent leaks about the new car's existence.

Concerned with the car's appearance, Picard enlisted the help of Italian design house Ghia as consultants to polish the styling details – the distinctive side air intakes on the Dauphine's rear fenders, for example, were finalized thanks to Ghia's input. In July 1953, he personally undertook a 2,200 km endurance road test in Spain, pushing a Dauphine prototype through harsh summer conditions to evaluate its reliability.

The first prototypes utilized the 4CV's 748 cc "Ventoux" engine, but Picard concluded that it was underpowered for the Dauphine's slightly larger size. He approved an increase in engine displacement to 845 cc, creating a more potent version that the development team nicknamed the "5CV" (5 taxable horsepower) engine. This upgrade gave the Dauphine roughly 30 hp, improving top speed and acceleration to meet the performance targets. By late 1954, the project was nearly complete; that year the car's official name "Dauphine".

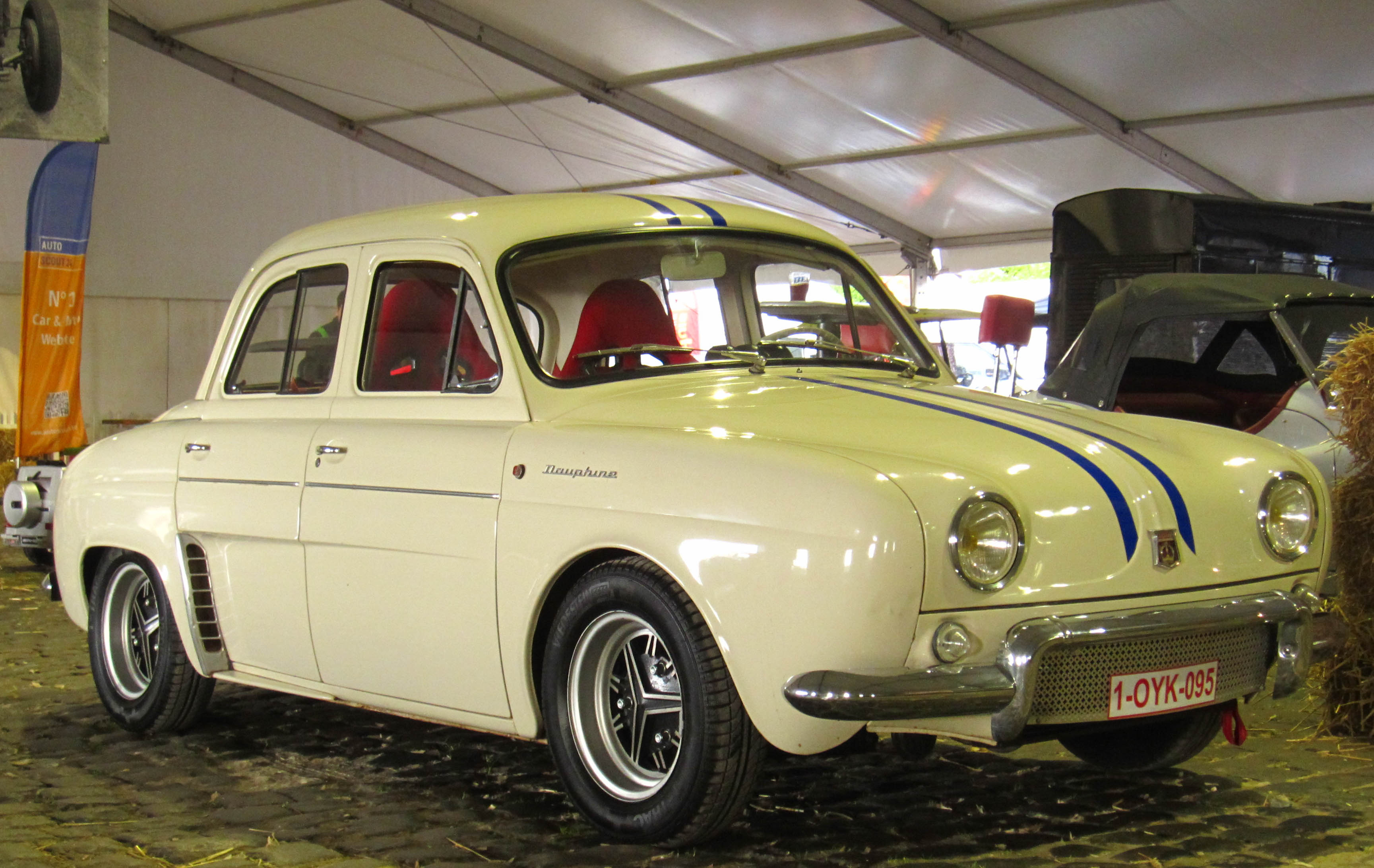
Renault Dauphine Gordini

Tragically, Pierre Lefaucheux did not live to see the Dauphine reach production. In January 1955, as development was concluding, Lefaucheux was killed in a car accident when his Renault Frégate overturned on an icy road. Nonetheless, Picard and his team pressed on under Renault's new president, Pierre Dreyfus, to launch the Dauphine. The first pre-production Dauphines rolled out of Renault's new Flins factory by late 1955, and the car was formally introduced in March 1956.

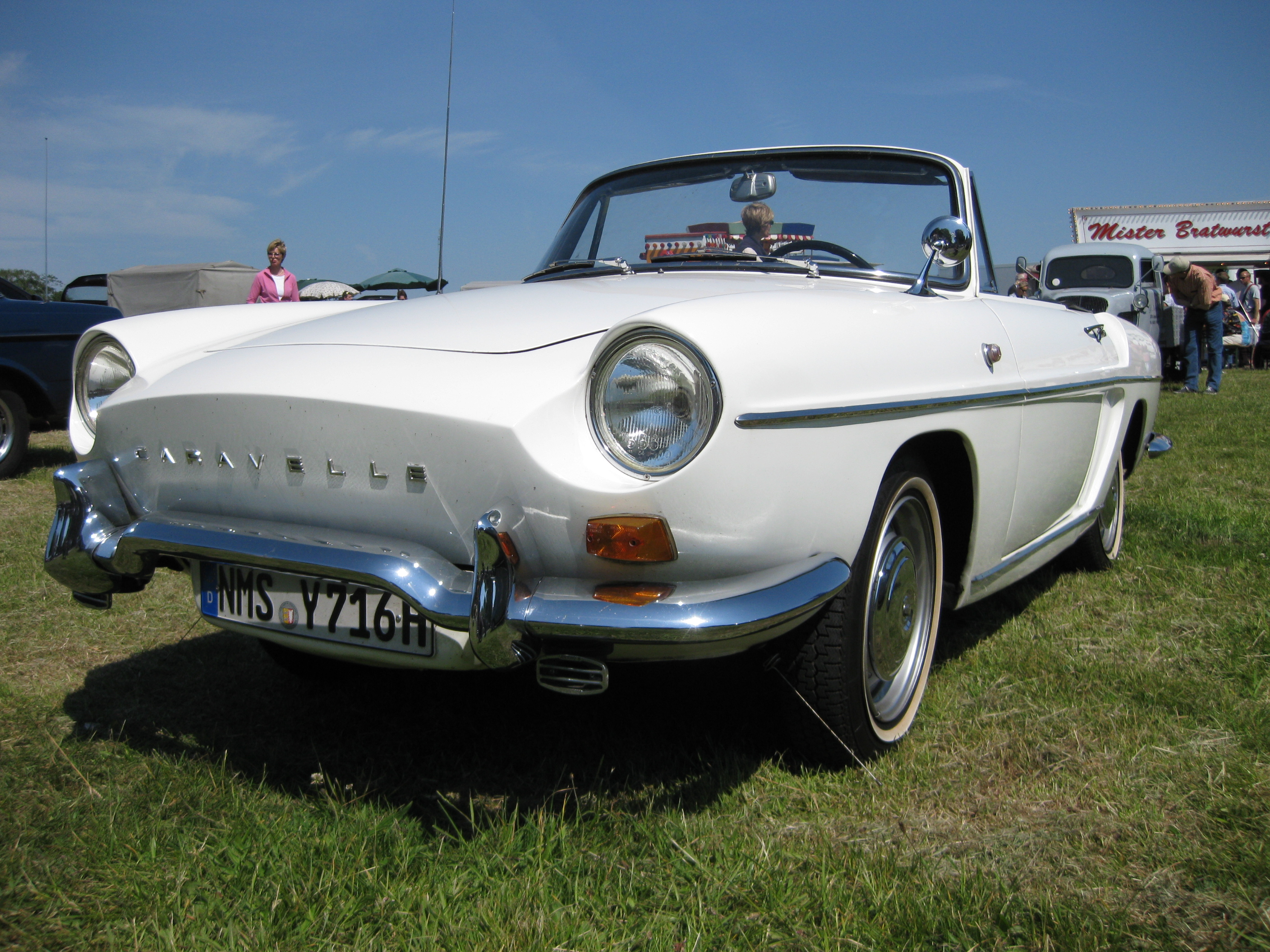
Renault Caravelle (Florida)

The Renault Dauphine became a commercial success. By the end of its production run (1956–1967), over two million Dauphines had been built worldwide. For a time, the Dauphine was the second-best-selling imported car in the United States behind only the VW Beetle. Picard also oversaw the development of sportier variants like the Dauphine Gordini (a higher-performance version tuned by Amédée Gordini and encouraged projects such as Renault Caravelle.

=== Experimental projects and later work ===
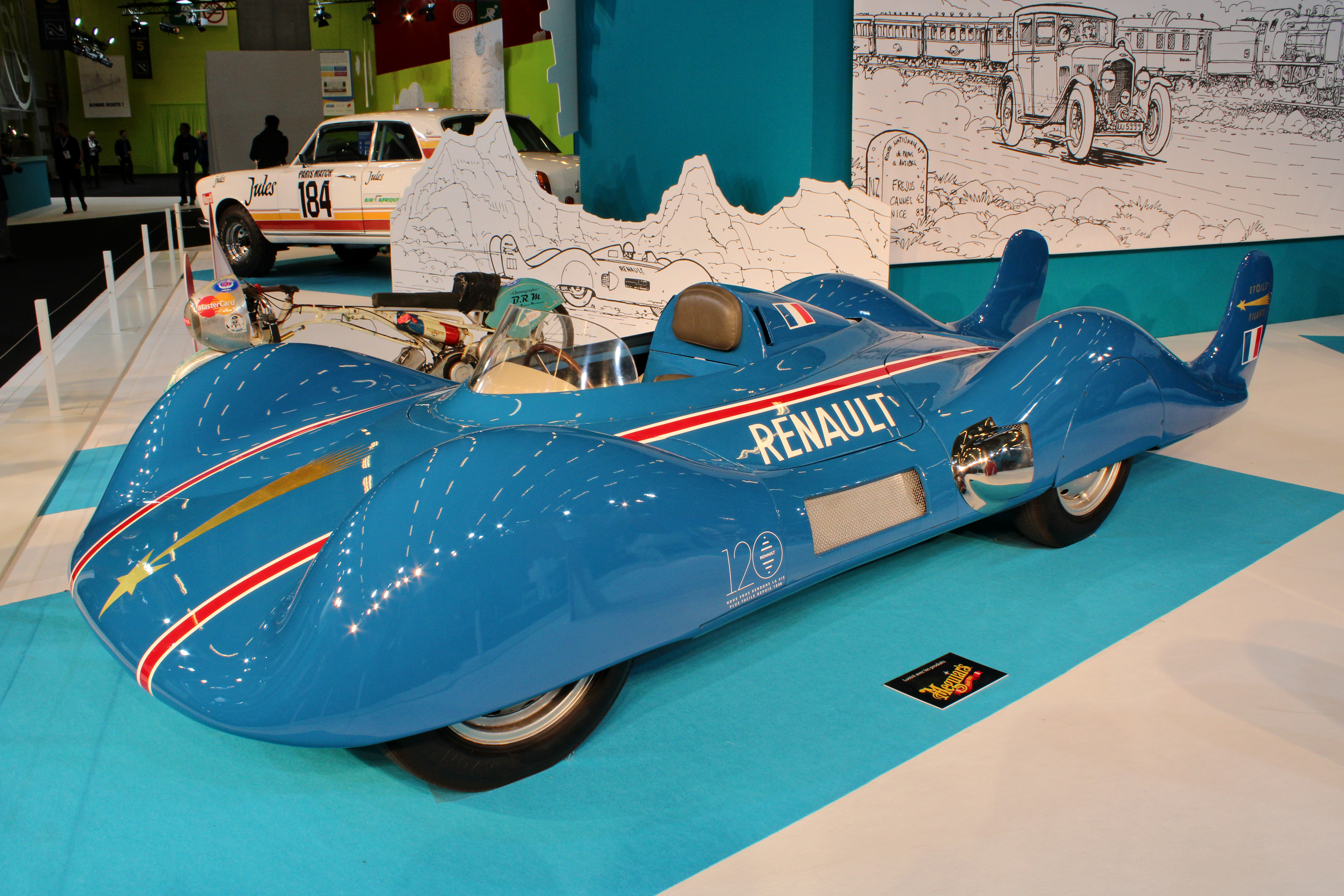
Renault Etoile Filante (1956)

In addition to designing mass-market cars, Fernand Picard played a key role in one of Renault's experimental vehicles of the 1950s: the Renault Étoile Filante turbine car. In the mid-1950s, Renault's management tasked Picard with exploring this advanced concept. Picard partnering with engine designer Albert Lory to develop the turbine powerplant, and engineer/test driver Jean Hébert to help build and run the car. The result was a rocket-like car powered by a 270 hp Turboméca turbine engine mounted behind the driver. On 5 September 1956, Picard's Étoile Filante set world speed records at the Bonneville Salt Flats in the United States, reaching 308.9 km/h (192 mph) over a flying kilometer and similar speeds over 5 km – records for turbine-powered cars that stood for decades.

In 1966, he was appointed a technical advisor to the new Renault president, Pierre Dreyfus, providing counsel based on his experience. Picard retired from Renault in 1969, ending a 34-year career at the company.

== Later life ==
In 1976, Picard published a memoir and historical account of his years at Renault titled L'Épopée de Renault 1935–1975.

Picard also served as President of the Société des Ingénieurs Arts et Métiers.

== Death ==
Fernand Picard died on 21 November 1993 in Montfort-l'Amaury, near Paris, at the age of 87.

== See also ==
- Renault Dauphine
- Renault 4CV
- Renault Étoile Filante
- Renault Caravelle
