= Renault Dauphine =

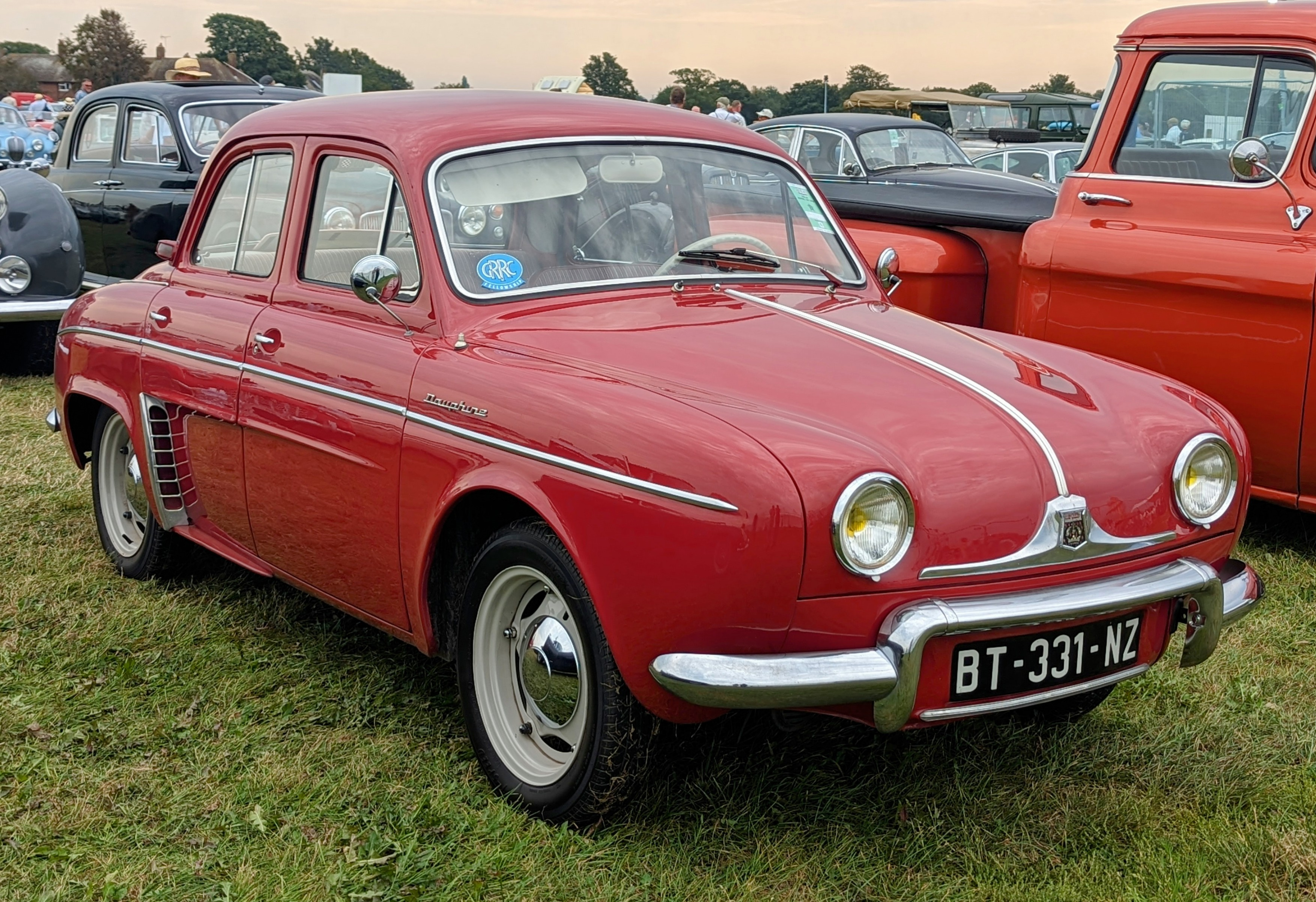

Overview
- Manufacturer: Renault
- Also called: Renault Ondine; Renault Gordini; Renault 850; Dauphine Alfa Romeo; IKA Dauphine; IKA Gordini
- Production: 1956–1967; 1959–1968 (Brazil); 1960–1970 (Argentina)
- Assembly: France: Flins (Flins Factory); Algeria: El-Harrach (CARAL); Argentina: Santa Isabel (IKA); Australia: Somerton; Australia: Heidelberg; Belgium: Haren-Vilvoorde (RIB); Brazil: São Bernardo do Campo (Willys-Overland); Italy: Alfa Romeo Portello Plant, Milan(1959–1964); Ireland: Dublin; Israel: Nesher, Haifa (Kaiser-Frazer); Mexico: Ciudad Sahagún; New Zealand: Petone (Todd Motors); Spain: Valladolid (FASA-Renault); United Kingdom: Acton
- Designer: Fernand Picard, Robert Barthaud, Jacques Ousset

Body and chassis
- Class: Small family car or economy car
- Body style: 4-door saloon
- Layout: RR layout
- Related: Renault Floride/Caravelle; Henney Kilowatt; Hino Contessa

Powertrain
- Engine: 845 cc (51.6 cu in) Ventoux I4
- Transmission: 3/4-speed manual 3-speed push-button semi-automatic

Dimensions
- Wheelbase: 2,267 mm (89.3 in)
- Length: 3,937 mm (155.0 in)
- Width: 1,524 mm (60.0 in)
- Height: 1,441 mm (56.7 in)
- Curb weight: 650 kg (1,430 lb)

Chronology
- Predecessor: Renault 4CV
- Successor: Renault 8 Renault 6

The Renault Dauphine (pronounced [dɔfin]) is a rear-engine, rear-wheel-drive, four-door sedan with three-box styling, marketed to the economy sector by Renault from 1956 to 1967 across a single generation.

Along with such cars as the Citroën 2CV, Volkswagen Beetle, Morris Minor, Mini and Fiat 600, the Dauphine pioneered the modern European economy car. More than two million Dauphines were manufactured, many under licence by other manufacturers outside of France.

Renault marketed numerous variants of the Dauphine, including a luxury version, the Renault Ondine; a decontented version, the Dauphine Teimoso (Brazil, 1965); sporting versions marketed as the Dauphine Gordini and the Ondine Gordini, and the 1093 factory racing model; as well as a prominent derivative, the Caravelle/Floride, a Dauphine-based two-door coupé and convertible.

== Conception ==
As Louis Renault's successor, and as Renault's chairman, Pierre Lefaucheux continued to defy the postwar French Ministry of Industrial Production – which had wanted to convert Renault solely to truck manufacture. Lefaucheux instead saw Renault's survival in automobiles and achieved considerable success with the 4CV, with over 500,000 produced by 1954.

The Dauphine was born during a conversation with Lefaucheux and engineer Fernand Picard. The two agreed the 4CV was appropriate in its postwar context, but that French consumers would soon need a car appropriate for their increasing standard of living, and the onset of the French Autoroute national highway implementation.

== Prototyping ==
Internally known as "Project 109" the Dauphine's engineering began in 1949 with engineers Fernand Picard, Robert Barthaud and Jacques Ousset managing the project.

A 1951 survey conducted by Renault indicated design parameters of a car with a top speed of 110 km/h (68 mph), seating for four passengers and fuel consumption of less than 7 L/100 km (40 mpg_{‑imp}; 34 mpg_{‑US}). The survey indicated that women held stronger opinions about a car's colors than about the car itself (See below, Marrot at Renault).

Engineers spent the next five years developing the Dauphine. Within the first year, designers had created a ⅛th-scale clay model, studied the model's aerodynamics, built a full-scale clay model, studied wood interior mockups of the seating, instrument panel, and steering column – and built the first prototype in metal.

Having largely finalized the exterior design, testing of the prototype began at Renault's facilities at Lardy, France – by secrecy of night, on July 24, 1952.

Using new laboratories and new specially designed tracks, engineers measured maximum speed, acceleration, braking and fuel consumption as well as handling, heating and ventilation, ride, noise levels and parts durability. Engineers tested parts by subjecting them to twisting and vibration stresses, and then redesigning the parts for manufacture.

By August 1953, head engineer Picard had an almond-green prototype delivered to Madrid for dry condition testing, ultimately experiencing only five flat tires and a generator failure after 2,200 km (1,400 mi). Subsequently, Lefaucheux ordered engineers to test a Dauphine prototype directly against a Volkswagen Beetle. The engineers determined that noise levels were too high, interior ventilation and door sealing were inadequate and most importantly, the engine capacity was insufficient at only four CV (748 cc). The four-cylinder engine was redesigned to increase its capacity to 845 cc by increasing the bore to 58 mm, giving the car a new informal designation, the 5CV. By 1954 a second series of prototypes incorporated updates, using the older prototypes for crash testing.

Lefaucheux followed the testing carefully, often meeting with his engineers for night testing to ensure secrecy, but did not live to see the Dauphine enter production. He was killed in an automobile accident on February 11, 1955, when he lost control of his Renault Frégate on an icy road and was struck on the head by his unsecured luggage as the car rolled over. The Flins factory was renamed in his honor, and he was succeeded on the project by Pierre Dreyfus.

By the end of testing, drivers had road tested prototypes in everyday conditions including dry weather and dusty condition testing in Madrid, engine testing in Bayonne, cold testing at the Arctic Circle in Norway, suspension testing in Sicily, weatherseal testing in then-Yugoslavia – a total of more than two million kilometres of road and track testing.

In December 1955, Pierre Bonin (director of the Flins Renault Factory) and Fernand Picard presented the first example to leave the factory to Pierre Dreyfus.

=== Debut ===
Renault officially revealed the model's existence to the press through L’Auto Journal and L’Action Automobile et Touristique in November 1955, referring to it simply by its unofficial model designation "the 5CV".

Advance press preview testing began on February 4, 1956, under the direction of Renault press secretary Robert Sicot, with six Dauphines shipped to Corsica. Journalists were free to drive anywhere on the island, while under contract not to release publication before the embargo date of March 1, 1956.

The Dauphine debuted on March 6, 1956 at Paris' Palais de Chaillot with over twenty thousand people attending, two days before its official introduction at the 1956 Salon International de l'Auto in Geneva.

=== Name ===
In addition to its internal project number, Project 109, the prototype had been called by its unofficial model designation, the "5CV". Lefaucheux, Renault's chairman, often simply called it La machine de Flins (the Flins machine), referring to the Flins factory where Renault would ultimately initiate its production (and which would later be named in Lefaucheux's honor).

Renault considered the name Corvette for its new model, but to avoid a conflict with GM because of the recently launched Chevrolet Corvette instead chose a name that reinforced the importance of the project's predecessor, the 4CV, to France's postwar industrial rebirth.

The final name was attributed to a dinner conversation at l'auberge de Port-Royal, chaired by Fernand Picard, where either Jean-Richard Deshaies or Marcel Wiriath said "the 4CV is the Queen of the road, the new arrival can only be the Dauphine." Dauphine is the feminine form of the French feudal title of Dauphin, the heir apparent to the throne.

Ironically, both Robert Opron and Flaminio Bertoni of Citroën had wanted to name the Citroën Ami 6 the Dauphine, though by that time, Renault had registered the name.

== Design ==
At introduction, the Dauphine was positioned in the marketplace between the concurrently manufactured 4CV, and the much larger Frégate. The new model followed the 4CV's rear-engine, four-door three-box sedan format, while providing greater room and power and pioneering a new focus for Renault on interior and exterior color and design.

=== Technical ===
The Dauphine used a version of the 4CV's water-cooled Ventoux engine with capacity increased from 760 cc to 845 cc, and power increased from 19–32 hp (14–24 kW). According to Road & Track, the Dauphine accelerated from 60 mph (97 km/h) in 32 seconds. Engine cooling was facilitated by air intakes behind each rear door and a vented rear fascia.

Heavier and 12 in (300 mm) longer than its predecessor, the 4-door body featured monocoque construction with "a pair of perimeter-shaped longitudinal box sections and substantial cross-bracing", but without the 4CV's rear-hinged suicide doors.

Swing axle suspension characteristics: : camber change on bumps, jacking on rebound

- Transmissions: Renault offered a three-speed manual transmission for the Dauphine, with synchronizers on 2nd and 3rd gear. In October 1961 synchromesh was provided for the 1st gear.

There was also the option of a semi-automatic transmission – in effect, a manual transmission coupled to dry clutch that engaged and disengaged by touching the gearshift – beginning in 1957 with an electromagnetically-operated Ferlec clutch and no separate clutch pedal – similar to Volkswagen's Autostick. Beginning in 1963, the Dauphine could be had with the three-speed transmission with electro-mechanical control, developed by Jaeger, which functioned as a "fully-automatic" transmission. Renault's "automatic transmission" was controlled by five dash-mounted push-buttons: R-N-D-2-1. A Renault advertisement at the time said "out went the stick, in went the push-buttons – and in stayed the zip, the fun, the economy (35–40 miles a gallon isn't unusual). That's because the only difference between our shift and shiftless cars is this: an electronic control unit on our pushbutton model shifts the gears for you, automatically."

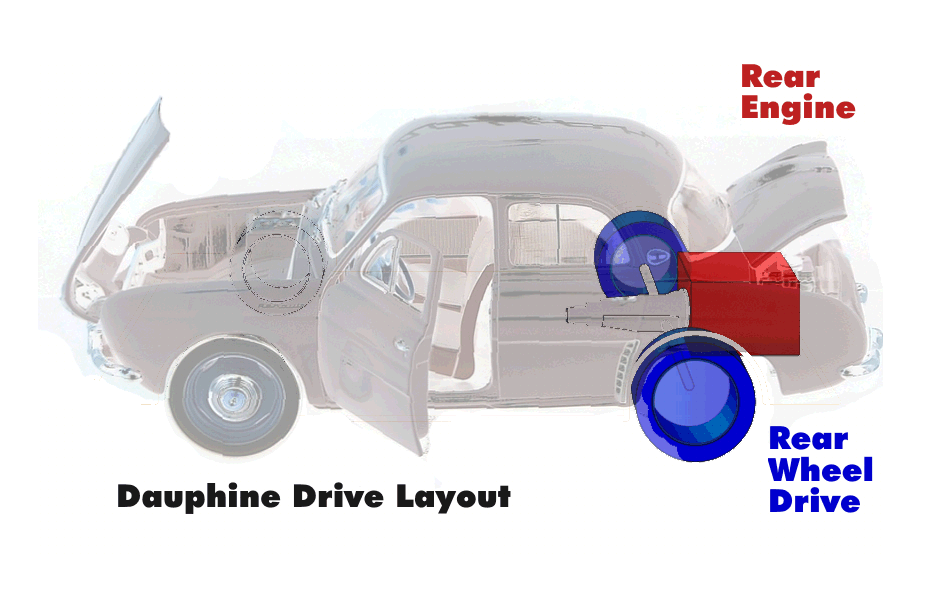
Drive layout

- Suspension: Front suspension was conventional coil-spring/wishbone layout with an anti-roll bar and rack-and-pinion steering, on a detachable front cross member. Rear suspension was a high-pivot swing axle with concentric coil-spring/telescopic dampers sitting atop the swing tubes which Renault called trumpet casings. With the exception of the trunnion arms in the transaxle housing, there was no fore-aft 'location' of the rear suspension. The pressed engine/transaxle/suspension mounting member was detachable from the main body structure. 61 percent of the Dauphine's weight was carried by the rear wheels.

The rear swing axle design, unless ameliorated by any of several options, can allow rear tires to undergo large camber changes during fast cornering, leading to oversteer – a dynamically unstable condition in which a vehicle can lose control and spin. Renault relied on a front anti-roll bar as well as tire pressure differential to eliminate oversteer characteristics – low front and high rear tire pressure — and induce understeer. The tire pressure differential strategy offered the disadvantage that owners and mechanics could inadvertently but easily re-introduce oversteer characteristics by over-inflating the front tires. In the United States, drivers (and General Motors) experienced virtually the same issues with the Chevrolet Corvair. In 1960 Renault revised the suspension with the addition of extra rubber springs up front and auxiliary air spring units (mounted inboard of the conventional coils) at the rear – marketing the system as Aerostable – and giving the rear wheels a small degree of negative camber and increased cornering grip.

- Engine configuration: Speaking about the Dauphine's rear-engine, rear-wheel-drive layout, Renault's Fernand Picard said in a paper he delivered in 1957 that the car was part of a rear-engine trend led by Volkswagen, Fiat and Renault whereby the rear drive/rear engine configuration had increased from 2.6 percent of continental western Europe's car production in 1946 to 26.6 percent in 1956. The United Kingdom auto industry, which had also managed largely to avoid the front-engine/front-wheel drive trend of the 1930s, was excluded from Picard's figures.

==== Engine specifications ====
Engine	Fuel	Displ.	Power	Torque	Top speed	0–60 mph (0–97 km/h)	Power-to-weight ratio
Type Ventoux 670–1	Gasoline	845 cc	27 hp (20.1 kW) at 4000 rpm	66 N⋅m (49 lbf⋅ft)	112 km/h (70 mph)	37 s	38.43 W/kg (41.54 hp/tonne)
Gordini – Ventoux 670–5	Gasoline	845 cc	36 hp (26.8 kW) at 4000 rpm	65 N⋅m (48 lbf⋅ft)	130 km/h (81 mph)	30 s	40.68 W/kg (54.55 hp/tonne)

=== Styling and interior ===
The Dauphine used a three-box design of the ponton genre, with cargo volume forward and engine volume rearward.

Overall, Dauphine styling was a scaled down version of the Renault Frégate, itself a classic three-box design of the ponton genre. Renault received styling assistance for the Dauphine at the request of Lefaucheux in June 1953 from Luigi Segre of Carrozzeria Ghia, especially with integrating the engine's air intake at the rear doors.

The Dauphine had a front-hinged trunklid, which housed the headlights and opened to a 7 cu ft (200 dm^{3}) trunk. The spare tire was carried horizontally under the front of the car, behind an openable panel below the bumper.

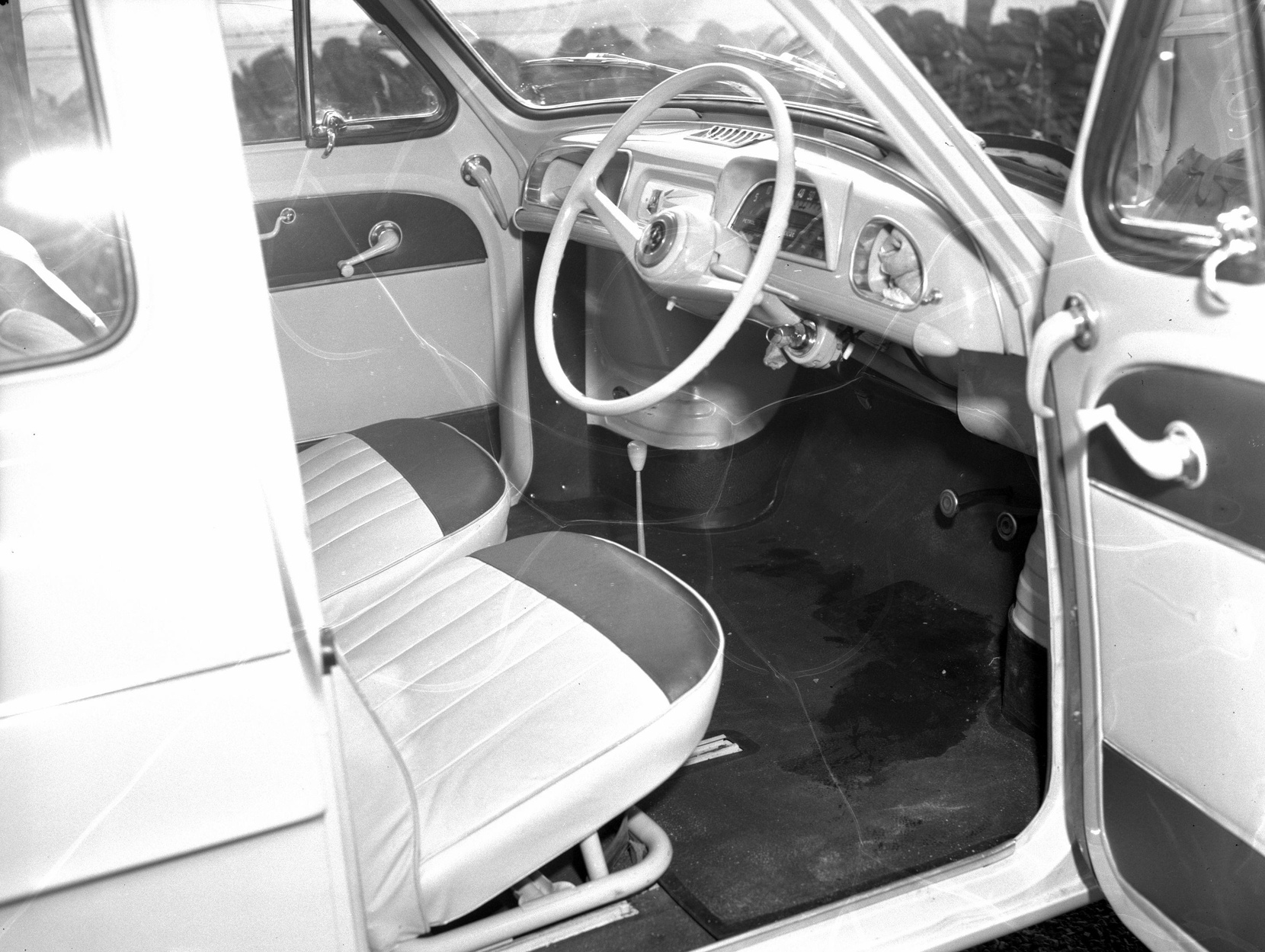
Dauphine interior

The interior featured adjustable front bucket seats and a rear bench seat, a heater, painted dash matching the exterior, twin courtesy lamps, a white steering wheel, rear bypassing (vs. roll down) windows, twin horns (town and country) selectable by the driver and twin open bins on the dashboard in lieu of gloveboxes. Exterior finishes included a range of pastel colors.

Subsequent to its introduction, and as a promotion for both companies (and an early instance of co-branding), Renault worked with Jacques Arpels of the prominent jewelers Van Cleef and Arpels to turn a Dauphine dashboard into a work of art.

=== Marrot at Renault ===
In 1950, the president of General Motors (GM) had visited Renault, noting the cars' drab colors, inside and out. According to their own 1951 Survey, Renault's studies had shown that women held stronger opinions on the colors of a car than the actual choice of a particular model. Coincidentally, well-known Parisian textile artist Paule Marrot (1902–1987) had written to Renault's chairman, Lefaucheux, giving her opinion that the cars of postwar Paris were a uniformly somber parade, and wondering whether an artist could not help find fresh, vibrant colors.

Marrot had attended Paris' prestigious L’école des Arts Décoratifs, had won a gold medal in 1925 at the Exposition Internationale des Arts Décoratifs et Industriels Modernes and had received a 1928 Prix Blumenthal.

Convinced of her value to the project, Pierre Lefaucheux made her a member of the Dauphine team — "to rid Renault of their stuffy image. After decades of being dipped in various shades of black and grey, car bodies [would be] painted in happy pastels."

Working with four others and after setting up a new test laboratory to measure fabric wear as well as paint wear and uniformity, Marrot proposed new body and interior colors. The new paint colors contrasted with those from the competition, the Peugeot 203 and Simca Aronde, including bright colors with names such as Rouge Montijo, Jaune Bahamas, Bleu Hoggar and Blanc Réja. Marrot and her team then developed complementary interior fabrics for the seats and door panels, turning to Paris' large textile houses. Marrot also designed the Dauphine's emblem of three dolphins over a crown, which adorned the Dauphine's steering wheel and hood throughout its production.

Later in life, Marrot went on to win the French Légion d'honneur (Legion of Honor), and Marrot's textiles were later licensed by companies as diverse as Nike and Hayden-Harnett.

== Variants ==
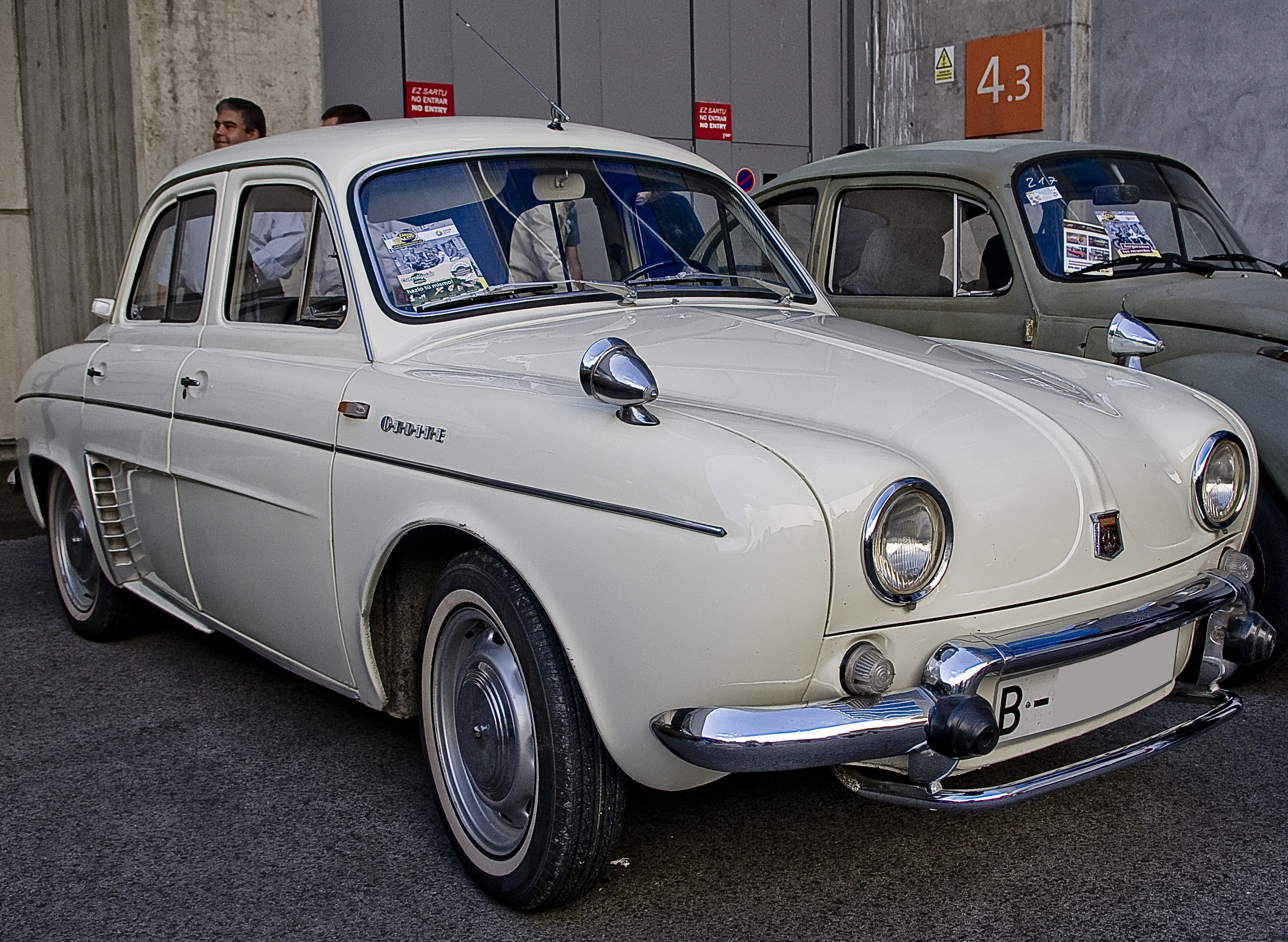
Renault Ondine

The Renault Ondine, an upmarket variant of the Dauphine, was introduced in 1961 and was offered for two years. It featured a 4-speed transmission.

The Gordini version was offered with a 4-speed transmission, four-wheel disc brakes from 1964 and increased horsepower, performance tuned by Amédée Gordini to 37 hp (27.2 kW). Both Dauphine Gordini and Ondine Gordini variants were offered.

The 1093 was a factory racing model limited edition of 2,140 homologated, which were tuned to 55 hp (41 kW) and featured a twin-barrel carburettor, four-speed manual transmission and tachometer, had a top speed of 140 km/h (87 mph), and were produced in 1962 and 1963. All were painted white with two thin blue stripes running front to back along the hood, roof and trunk.

== Global manufacture ==
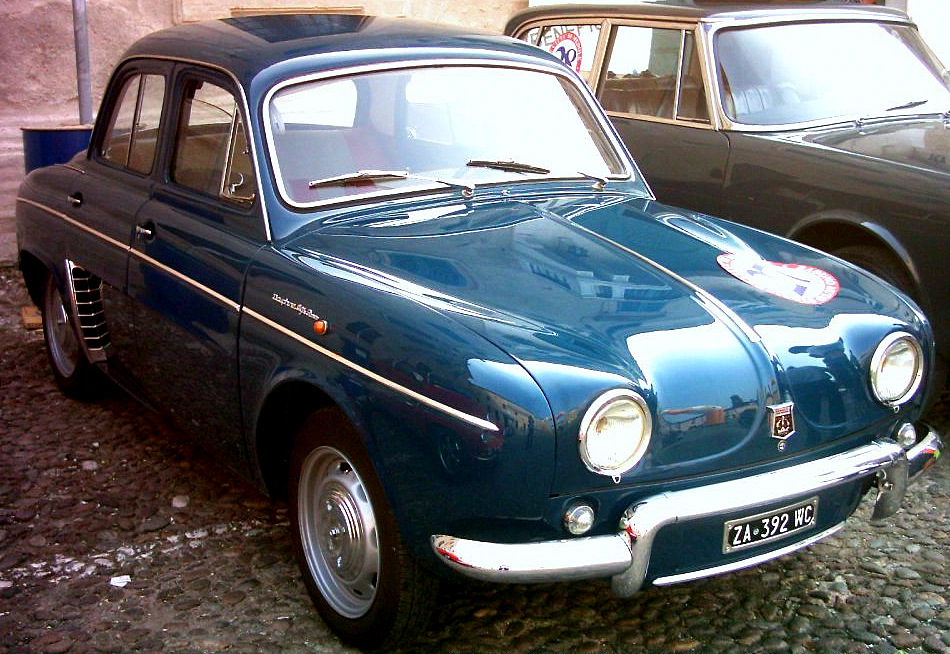
Dauphine Alfa Romeo

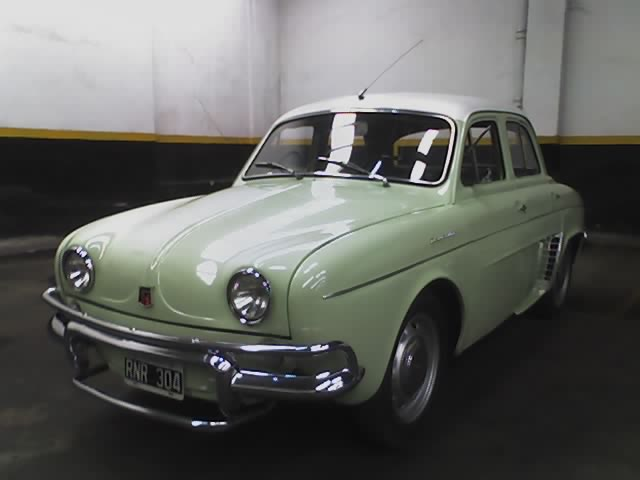
Argentine Dauphine (made by Industrias Kaiser Argentina) – This unit was made in 1962 – Note the additional piece over the bumpers

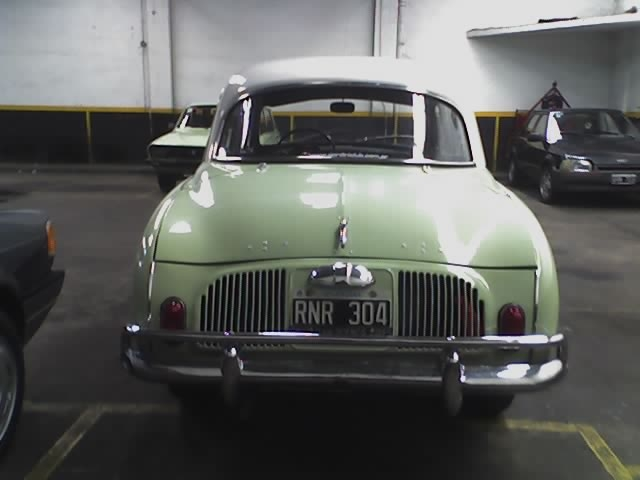
Argentine Dauphine (made by Industrias Kaiser Argentina) – This unit was made in 1962 – Note the additional piece over the bumpers

Renault manufactured the Dauphine at its Flins factory, with a car leaving the assembly line every 20–30 seconds, and with engines from the company's headquarters factory on Île Seguin in Billancourt, Paris. The highly automated Billancourt site could produce an engine every 28 seconds.

The Dauphine was also manufactured worldwide:

Argentina: Industrias Kaiser Argentina produced the Dauphine under the Renault License in the Santa Isabel facility. 97,209 IKA Dauphines and Gordinis were produced as follows:

- IKA Dauphine (1960–1966)
- IKA Gordini (1962–1970)
- Renault 850 (1967–1970 – a reduced-specification model)

Argentinian regulations required the manufacturers to incorporate extra bumper bars as seen here in the photographs of an Argentine unit.

Australia: Renault (Australia) Pty Ltd assembled the Dauphine at Somerton, Victoria.

Brazil: The Dauphine was produced under license by Willys-Overland, between 1959 and 1968, in the following versions: Dauphine: 23,887 units (1959–1965); "Gordini": 41,052 units (1962–1968); "Renault 1093": 721 units (1963–1965); "Teimoso" (simplified model, without accessories): 8,967 units (1965–1967).

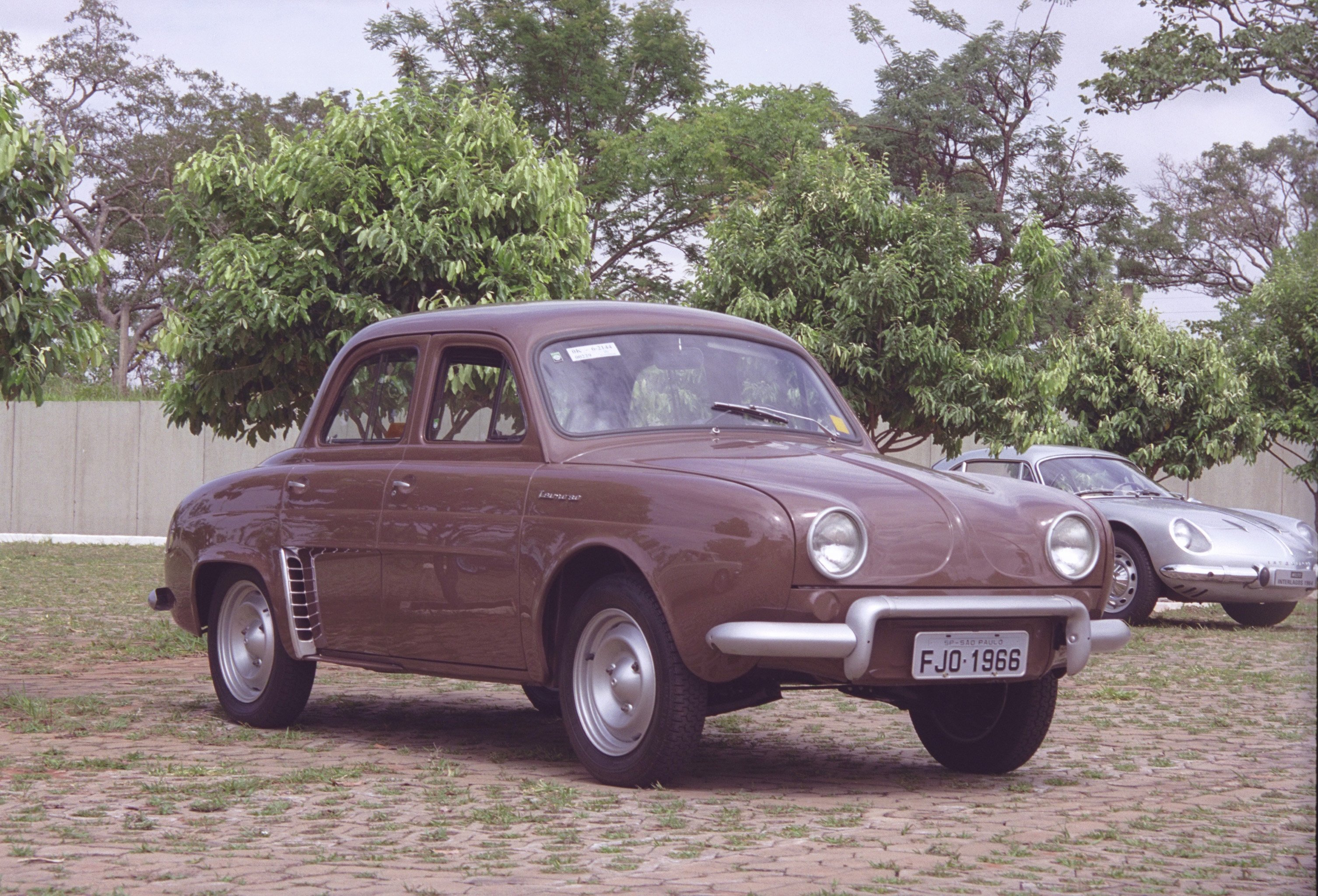
Brazilian made Renault Teimoso 1966

A total of 74,627 units was produced in Brazil.

Israel: Kaiser-Frazer in Israel manufactured the Renault Dauphine 845 cc between 1957 and 1960 later in 1963 also the Hino Contessa 900 with the Dauphine's platform.

Italy: The Dauphine was manufactured under license by Alfa Romeo at its Portello, Milan facility from 1959 to 1964 and marketed as the Dauphine Alfa Romeo — featuring a Magneti-Marelli 12 volt electrical system, rather than 6 volt in the French model, and carrying a logo "Dauphine Alfa Romeo" or "Ondine Alfa Romeo." As a chief competitor to Alfa Romeo, Gianni Agnelli, Fiat's chairman, targeted the Dauphine by lobbying to revise the basis for taxation from engine-displacement to overall length, successfully damping Dauphine sales. 73,000 Dauphines were manufactured in Italy.

New Zealand: Dauphines were assembled under contract to W R Smallbone Ltd by Todd Motors' Petone plant from 1961 to 1967, according to Mark Webster's book Assembly. This lists 1964 output at 199 units, 384 in 1965, 354 in 1966 and 233 in 1967. Renault assembly shifted in 1967 to Campbell Industries in Thames and Campbell Motors took over the franchise in 1968. Campbell's also assembled the Hino Contessa from 1966 to 1968. When Renault assembly began in Australia in the late 1960s, Campbell's supplied jigs.

Japan: In Japan, the Hino Contessa 900 used the Dauphine's platform under license.

Spain: In Spain, Renault's subsidiary F.A.S.A built Dauphine FASA between 1958–1967 (125,912 units).

United States: The Dauphine was the base vehicle for the electric Henney Kilowatt. Among the aftermarket options for the Dauphine was a supercharger from United States company Judson Research & Mfg. Co.; this sold in 1958 for US$165, and was designed to be installed in about two hours without any chassis or body modifications.

== Succession ==
By the early 1960s, Renault sought to avoid the single-model-culture that had nearly destroyed Volkswagen, accelerating the development of the Dauphine's successor, the R8, which supplemented the Dauphine in 1962. Renault celebrated the end of Dauphine production with a limited edition of 1000 models. The last of the base-model Dauphines was produced in December 1966 and the last Gordini models were sold in December 1967. By this time the Dauphine had been excluded from the manufacturer's production lines and Dauphine assembly during the model's final years was subcontracted, along with that of the Caravelle, to Brissonneau and Lotz at Creil.

== Reception ==
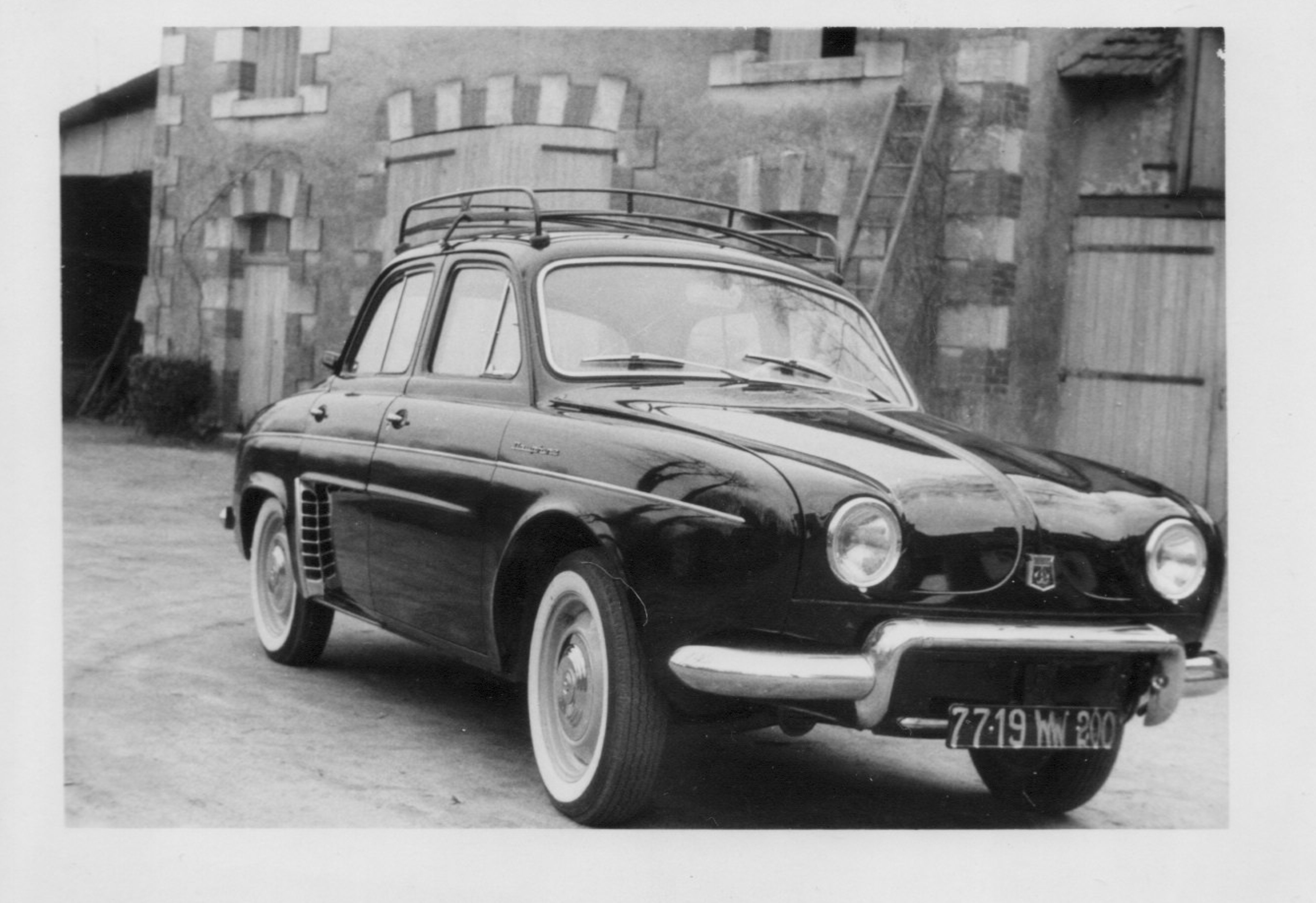
1958 Renault Dauphine

In 1956, according to a retrospective in The Independent, when the Dauphine debuted "it proved an almost instant success across the globe: the new coachwork was deemed highly elegant, the price was low, and the Dauphine's overall size was still suitable for congested Parisian streets."

In 1957 the US motoring weekly The Motor called the Dauphine the "prettiest little four-seater in the world".

In June 1957 Popular Science gave a phonetic tip on how to pronounce the car's name as Renno DOUGH-feen, saying "the car feels and acts like a Detroit product, despite the caboose engine" and adding "Nimble, it reaches 50 mph in 19 seconds. It darts through traffic like a beagle after a cottontail."

By 1958 Popular Science had both good and bad to report, saying "It has a host of exquisite touches, you can lock the steering wheel with the ignition key, an ideal frustration for thieves. Choking is automatic. The engine, for its size, is one of Europe's best. Driver visibility is good. The ride is soft, the cornering excellent. Overall maneuverability may be tops among the more popular imports. The owner's manual is the most complete." On the negative side, the magazine said "Yet the Dauphine incorporates a bag of annoyances peculiar to itself. On the car tested, too much reach was required in moving the transmission-mounted shift lever. There was inadequate toe clearance above the pedals. In an anxiety to shrink the body, the maker intrudes the wheel wells into the front compartment. Passengers have to stoop and squat to get in. The doors lack hold-opens. The transmission whines. Too-liberal use of plastics cheapens an otherwise attractive interior and inclusion of two-toned horns for town and country is – for the U.S.A. – pure caprice. But the real fault of this car is low power and too-ambitious transmission and axle ratios. Above 40 mph the remarkably quiet little engine begins sighing over its chores. It has a marked reluctance for passing at highway speeds. Will Paris please synchronize that first gear?"

In 1962 Road & Track tested the Dauphine Gordini and called it 'peevish,' with a top speed of 80 mph (129 km/h) and a 0 to 60 mph (97 km/h) time of 22.3 seconds.

In 1969 Motor Trend said "There is nothing in the handling at normal speeds to indicate that the engine is stowed in the rear but push up to some high-speed cornering and the rear end becomes quite skittish, requiring skilled control of an oversteer condition that presents itself."

A retrospective in The Evening Chronicle noted the Dauphine's propensity to rust if not given careful attention, saying also a Dauphine "has to be treated with a lot of respect because it was one of the true pioneers of the modern continental car."

In July 2010 Jonathan Burnette, a Texas mechanic, set out to drive his 1959 Dauphine to Alaska and back, saying "I've driven these cars all over the country, many, many times, and I've never had that much trouble at all. A lot of people don't like this car, so it's kind of like the underdog."

=== Sales ===
In 1966 a Renault press statement said Dauphine production passed the million mark in just four years – more quickly than any other car manufactured in Europe.

In the United Kingdom, the Dauphine was one of the first imported cars to sell in large numbers, in a market formerly dominated by British manufacturers and local subsidiaries of American manufacturers.

A total of 2,150,738 Dauphines were produced in its production run of 10 years.

=== United States ===
A 1958 Time article said: "The car that has come up fastest in the US market in the past year is Renault's Dauphine. A snub-nosed 32-hp Sedan, it is low-priced, economical and small enough to shoehorn into a small parking space." The same article said "The Dauphine is already outselling Volkswagen in eleven U.S. states, including Texas. So brisk is demand that Renault and the French Line have formed a new shipping company CAT (Compagnie d'Affrètement et de Transport). with six freighters that ferry up to 1,060 Dauphines each across the Atlantic. To serve the U.S. buyer, Renault in just 18 months has also built a nationwide network of 16 U.S. distributors and 410 dealers." In a 1959 survey, 85.4% of users rated the car as excellent, and only 0.7% as poor, while only 5.4% experienced a breakdown. By that time it was the second most popular imported car after Volkswagen, which apart from having only two doors, offered slightly worse economy and manoeuvrability.

After initial success in the U.S. market, the Dauphine began to suffer. An internal agent, Bernard Hanon (who would later become chairman of Renault), conducted a thorough market study that signaled trouble, and sent his report to the director of Renault Inc. in New York. The director filed the report away without acting on it; it was found years later by envoys from corporate headquarters in Billancourt. The damage had already been done; thousands of unordered Dauphines sat at ports worldwide, decaying. The damage to Renault was immense; and the company faced the first serious crisis in its history.

By October 1960 a slump had hit imported cars in the US. Time reported that "In August the U.S. imported 50% fewer French cars than in July, and for the first six months of the year imports ran 33% below the rate for the same period in 1959. Two ships loaded with Renault Dauphines were turned back in mid-Atlantic because the docks in New York were already overcrowded with unsold Dauphines."

In the U.S., Renault sold 28,000 Dauphines in 1957, 57,000 in 1958 and 102,000 in 1959 — falling to 12,106 by 1966.

=== Criticism ===
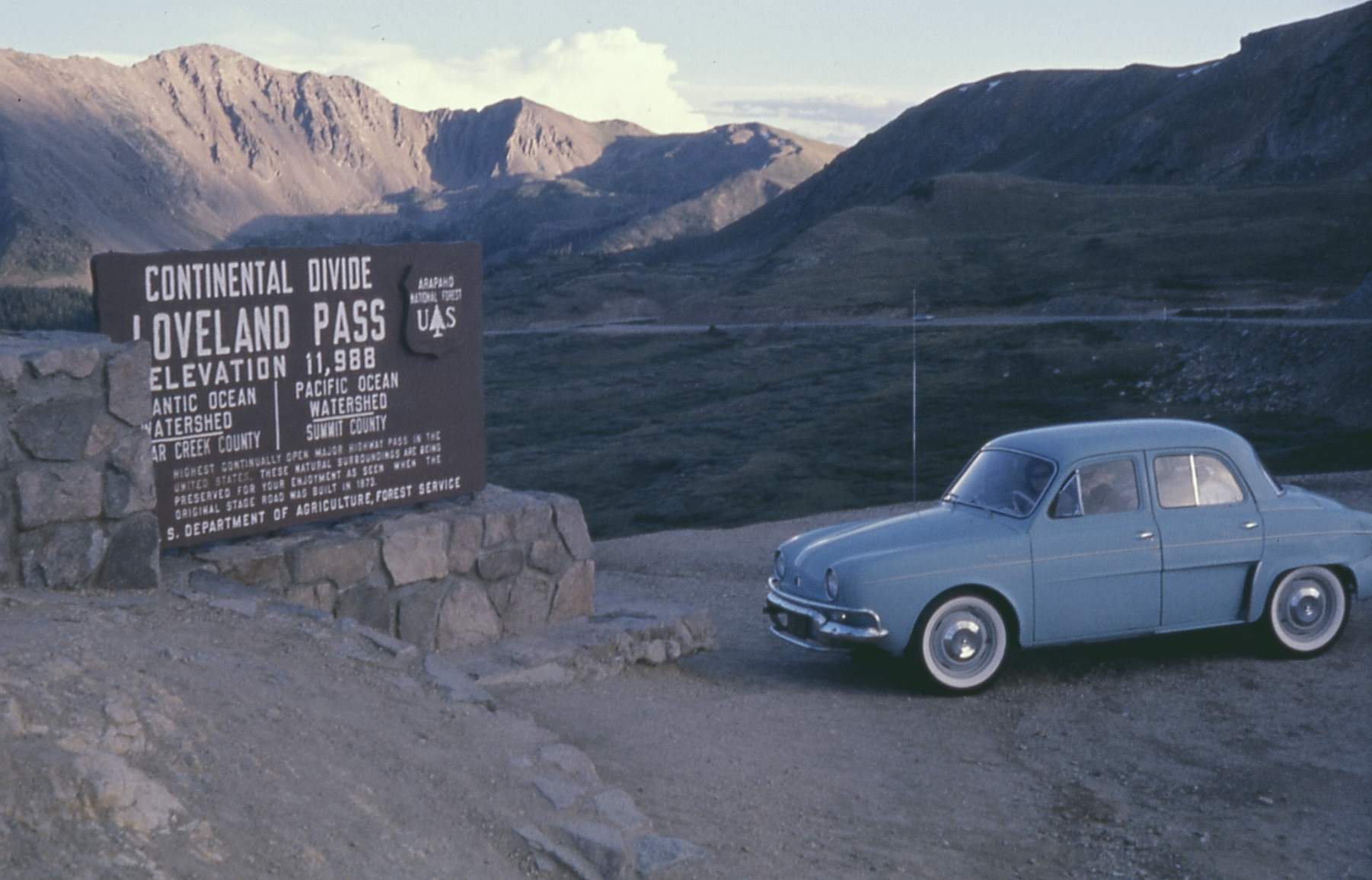
Renault Dauphine at the top of the Continental Divide, in Colorado, US in August, 1964

A 2008 retrospective article in The Independent said "as soon as the US market had come to grips with the Dauphine's swing-axle manners and useless acceleration, they were pole-axed by its abysmal corrosion record. It would take only one New York winter of driving on salt-strewn roads to give a Dauphine front wings that resembled net curtains."

In 1967, in debut U.S. magazine advertising for the Dauphine's successor, the Renault 8, Renault said: "Our [earlier] cars were not fully prepared to meet the demands of America ... More than a fair share of things went wrong with our cars. Less than a fair share of our dealers were equipped to deal with what went wrong," describing the Dauphine's replacement as "The Renault for people who swore they would never buy another one."

In a 2000 survey, Car Talk named the Dauphine the 9th Worst Car Of The Millennium, calling it "truly unencumbered by the engineering process" — albeit in a survey where Tom Magliozzi called the voters "a self-selecting bunch of wackos, most of whom are really aggravated by a bad experience with one of the cars".

In 2007, Time with Pulitzer Prize-winning journalist Dan Neil named the Dauphine one of the 50 Worst Cars of All Time, calling it "the most ineffective bit of French engineering since the Maginot Line" and saying that it could actually be heard rusting.

== Motorsport ==
The Dauphine achieved numerous motorsport victories, including taking the first four places in its class at the 1956 Mille Miglia with a factory team of five cars with five-speed gearboxes; winning the 1956 Tour de Corse (Corsica Rally) with Belgian female drivers Gilberte Thirion and Nadege Ferrier; winning the 1958 Monte Carlo Rally and the Tour de Corse with drivers Guy Monraisse and Jacques Féret; winning the 1959 Rallye Côte d'Ivoire (Ivory Coast Rally); and in 1962 winning the Tour de Corse (Dauphine 1093 with drivers Pierre Orsini and Jean Canonicci). Between 1963 and 1971 did win with different drivers the Class B in the Argentine Touringcar championship Turismo Nacional. The Dauphine also participated in the 1966 Trans-American Sedan Championship.

== See also ==
- Ford 021C
- Nissan Figaro
