= Renault Billancourt engine =

Billancourt engine
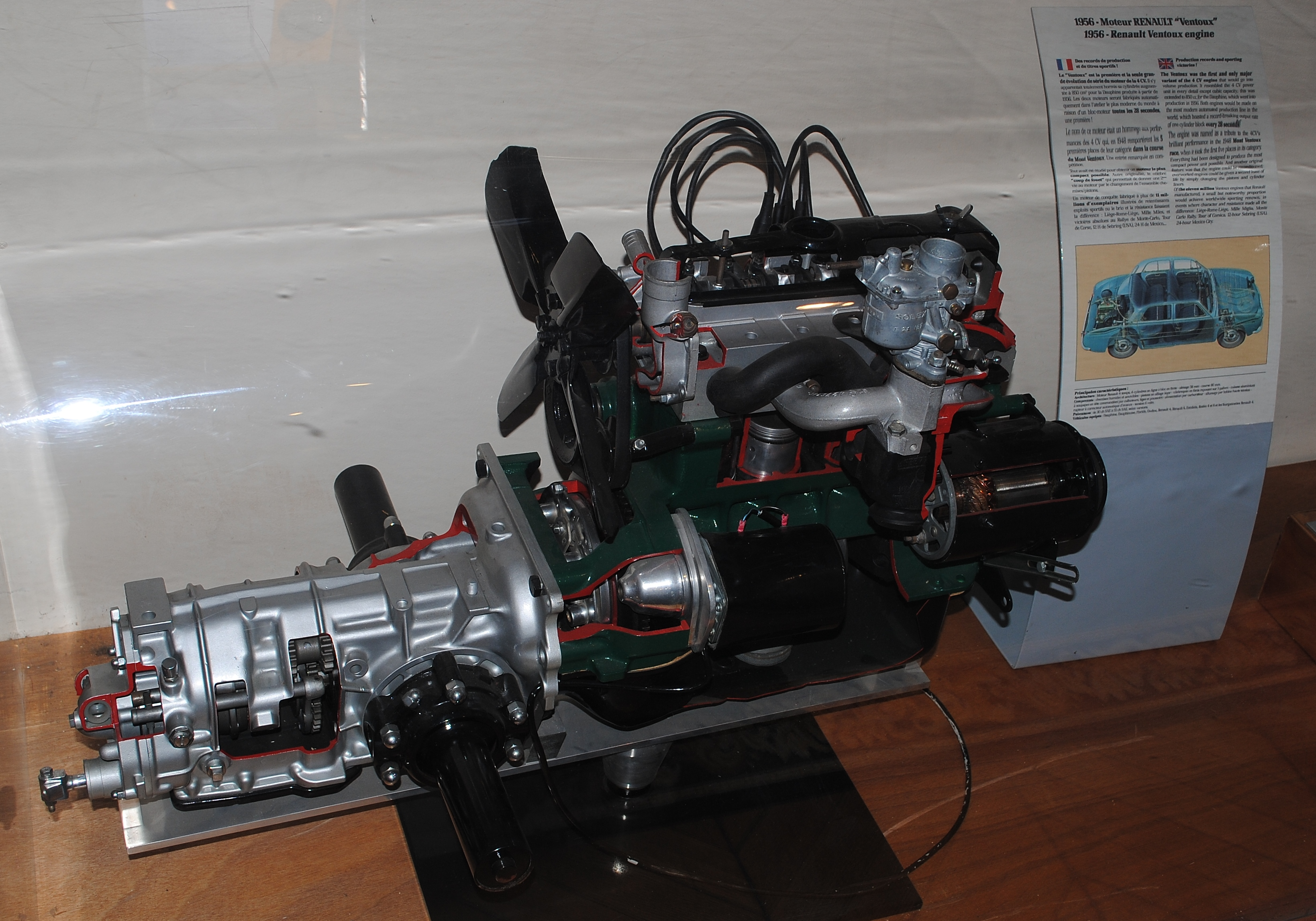

Overview
- Manufacturer: Renault
- Also called: Ventoux engine, B-Type engine
- Production: 1947–1985

Layout
- Configuration: Naturally aspirated Inline-4
- Displacement: 0.6 L (603 cc); 0.7 L (747 cc); 0.8 L (760 cc); 0.8 L (782 cc); 0.8 L (845 cc)
- Cylinder bore: 49 mm (1.93 in); 54.5 mm (2.15 in); 55 mm (2.17 in); 55.8 mm (2.20 in); 58 mm (2.28 in)
- Piston stroke: 80 mm (3.15 in)
- Cylinder block material: Cast-iron
- Cylinder head material: Aluminium
- Valvetrain: OHV
- Compression ratio: 9.2:1

Combustion
- Fuel system: Solex or Weber carburetor
- Fuel type: Petrol
- Cooling system: Water-cooled

Output
- Power output: 17–55 hp (13–41 kW; 17–56 PS)
- Torque output: 42–62.8 N⋅m (31.0–46.3 lbf⋅ft)

Chronology
- Successor: Cléon-Fonte engine

The Billancourt engine was an automotive engine designed by Renault for the Renault 4CV, used subsequently until 1985. It later received the internal code "B", for Billancourt. The "sport" version is called Ventoux engine.

== History ==
The engine is liquid-cooled, with four cylinders in line. It is also characterised by its three main bearing design and its piston stroke of 80 mm (3.15 in). It has a cast-iron block, aluminium cylinder head and uses a lateral camshaft to operate overhead valves, which also operated the fan belt on its other end. In June 1940, Louis Renault appointed Fernand Picard, who became deputy technical director in the automobile engine department. During World War II, he participated in the study of a small car: the future 4CV. Its engine was ready in 1942 and a year later, it first turned a wheel. Renault replaced this engine with the Cléon-Fonte engine, a completely new design.

This engine designed by Fernand Picard was produced from 1947 to 1985, in displacements of 0.6 L (603 cc), 0.7 L (748 cc), 0.8 L (782 cc), and 0.8 L (845 cc). These differences were carried out by changing the cylinder bore diameter

== Different displacement ==
=== 760 cc ===
Commercialized in 1947 with the Renault 4CV, the first version of the "engine Billancourt" was a 0.8 L (760 cc) of 17 hp (13 kW) SAE. In 1950, a 21 hp (15 kW) SAE version was fitted to the Renault 4CV Grand Luxe, produced only in 1950.

=== 747 cc ===
In October 1950, the 0.7 L (747 cc) replaced the 0.8 L (760 cc). The slightly lower displacement was obtained by slightly reducing the size of the bore from 55 to 54.5 mm (2.17 to 2.15 in), while the stroke remained unchanged. This change was decided by the leaders of Renault in order to be able to use this extremely undersquare engine in competitions where it was necessary to stay below 0.8 L (750 cc) to homologate the car in its category. This new displacement offered six power levels, from 24 to 35 hp (18 to 26 kW) SAE, all of 4 fiscal horsepower.

=== 782 cc ===
In 1971, the 0.8 L (782 cc) appeared with an increased bore, from 54.5 to 55.8 mm (2.15 to 2.20 in), always with an unchanged stroke of 80 mm (3.15 in). This engine was proposed in both variants developing 27 and 36 hp (20 and 26 kW). The less powerful one was mounted under the hood of the Renault 4L produced between 1971 and 1980, while the variant developing 36 hp (26 kW) was used on the Renault 5 produced between 1972 and 1976.

=== 845 cc ===
The highest engine capacity of the Billancourt engine appeared in 1956 at the launch of the Renault Dauphine, one of the main models equipped with this engine; it displaces 0.8 L (845 cc). The rear-engine version was codenamed 670. It also equipped the Renault 4 from 1964 and the Renault 6 base model; in these front-engined, front-wheel drive applications the engine was codenamed 800. The bore was increased to 58 mm (2.28 in). The power ranged between 30 and 38 hp (22 and 28 kW) SAE for standard (non-Gordini) engines.

The fourth and final version developed 38 hp (28 kW) maximum power and 57 N⋅m (42 lbf⋅ft) torque at 2,500 rpm. This was made possible by machining the cylinder head, with new valves and valve seats, as well as improvements in engine cooling. It was fitted on the Renault 5L from 1977 to 1984. Later models were called B1B, reflecting Renault's new engine numbering system.

=== 603 cc ===
This was the cheapest Billancourt engine to produce. The bore was reduced to 49 mm (1.93 in) for a total displacement of 0.6 L (603 cc). The maximum power reached 23 hp (17 kW) SAE, 20 hp (15 kW) DIN at 4,800 rpm, while the maximum torque was 42 N⋅m (31 lbf⋅ft). This engine was mounted only on the Renault 3 (1961–1962), an ultra-Spartan version of The Renault 4.

== Ventoux Engine ==
The "sport" version is called Ventoux engine, named after the Mont Ventoux Hill Climb.

=== 747 cc Ventoux ===
The sport variant of the engine, which equipped the Alpine A106 and the Renault 4 CV R1063, underwent major modifications which affected, among other things, the connecting rods (now more powerful and duralumin), the camshaft, the (larger) valves and the Solex carburetor. Significantly higher values were obtained, ranging from 35 hp (26 kW) SAE nominal for a Renault 4 CV R1063 standard (up to 40 hp (29 kW) SAE and more for the versions used in racing) to 43 hp (32 kW) SAE for the engine used on the A106 (some were prepared at 50 hp (37 kW) SAE). For this last application, the Solex twin-choke carburetor was preferred to a twin-choke Weber carburetor.

=== Ventoux Gordini ===
The more powerful versions were developed by Amédée Gordini from the original engine. The machining of the inclined valve seats allows for a greater range but leaving intact the camshaft spindle, improved cylinder head cooling, and the engine is fitted with a new 32 mm (1.26 in) Solex carburettor. This, in conjunction with the increase in compression ratio, results in a maximum power of 37 hp (27 kW) SAE at 5,000 rpm with a maximum torque of 62.8 N⋅m (46 lbf⋅ft) at 3500 rpm. This engine made its debut in the fall of 1957, then, in 1959, it underwent further modifications and its power was increased to 40 hp (29 kW) SAE. The "Sorcerer" then makes a small preparation, thus the Dauphine Gordini (type R1091) is born in 1957.

The power of the block increases to 37 hp (27 kW) SAE and the top speed to 126 km/h (78 mph) thanks to a new cylinder head, increased compression ratio and the use of a 32 mm (1.26 in) carburetor, springs Harder valves and larger intake and exhaust ducts. The first modifications made by Amedée Gordini (cylinder head with vertical outlet) will not however be kept on the model of series for reasons of cost.

The engine will win three horses on the 1960 models. The Dauphine Gordini will appear in the catalog from the summer of 1957 to 1963 and reappear in 1965.

In 1960 and 1965, new modifications improved the torque. Then came a much more powerful version, obtained by a new camshaft, new valves, a 32 mm (1.26 in) Solex double body carburettor, and by increasing the compression ratio to 9.2:1. bringing the maximum power to 55 hp (40 kW) SAE, 49 hp (36 kW) DIN.

=== Ventoux 1093 ===
Renault called on Amédée Gordini to produce a supertuned version of the Renault Dauphine: The Dauphine 1093 (type R1093), a sporty derivative of the Dauphine which appeared at the end of 1961. The modifications mainly concerned the engine. It used pistons with convex heads (compression ratio increased to 9.2:1), a reversed Solex twin-choke carburetor type 32 PAIA 3, a special camshaft, double valve springs and Autobleu intake manifolds and exhaust. The sprockets were reinforced as well as the clutch. With a capacity of 55 hp (40 kW) SAE, 49 hp (36 kW) DIN, the car reached 140 km/h (87 mph).

The 4th gear was modified compared to the box of the Dauphine Gordini. The original braking system was improved by the addition of cooling fins on the perimeter of the front drums. The suspension was that of the Dauphine type "bad roads" but with shorter springs without lowering the ground clearance. The 1093 was the only Dauphine to have been marketed in France with 12-volt electrical equipment similar to the export versions instead of the original 6 volts.

Externally, the 1093 was distinguished from the Dauphine Gordini by its large-diameter 180 mm (7.1 in) headlights borrowed from the US version, its body white cream "Réjane" having two blue strips glued in the axis of the vehicle and "1093" badging to the right rear as well as the right front wing.

Inside, an additional tachometer was fitted to the left of the speedometer graduated up to 180 km/h (110 mph).

Despite its very sporty character for "everyone", the 1093 series could not be competitive without having been prepared. The preparation consisted of modifying and polishing the existing mechanics because the new sports regulations in force as early as 1960 prohibited any increase in displacement as well as changes of parts. Ferry dealt with many of the 1093 Dauphine competitors who became "1093 Enhanced".

Only 2,140 copies (plus an additional 8 pre-series cars) were produced in two series. The first consisted of 1,650 units for homologation purposes (1,500 copies minimum), with a second batch of 490 units, fitted with disc brakes and painted white gray "Valois", built to meet additional customer demand. The 1093 is the most sought after of all the Dauphines. Today, it is estimated that around a hundred of 1093 have survived, half of which are still rolling.

In 1962, the Dauphine 1093 was seen at the Tour of Corsica Rally. However, its late launch and relatively modest performance improvements did not allow for a long sports career. The 1093 remains an engaging car that ensures the transition between the artisanal 4CV 1063 and the R8 Gordini that would revolutionize the car competition "tourism series".

== Succession ==
In 1962, the Sierra engine, later renamed "Cléon-Fonte engine", appeared on the Renault Floride S and the Renault 8. It innovated with its five-bearing crankshaft. It was a medium-displacement engine, not replacing the Billancourt engine which remained to power lower-range models. Over the years, cars became heavier and more efficient, forcing Renault to abandon the Billancourt engine and, as a result, the Cléon-Fonte engine came to be considered a small-displacement engine by 1980, when the Billancourt engine disappeared.

The Cléon-Fonte engine is not an evolution of the Billancourt engine but an entirely new engine designed by the engineer René Vuaillat. Both engines have a lateral camshaft and a chain or sprocket drive, and so a distant resemblance.

== Models equipped with this engine ==
- Renault 4CV
- Renault Dauphine and Ondine
- Renault Juvaquatre
- Renault Caravelle and Renault Floride
- Renault Estafette
- Renault 3
- Renault 4
- Renault 5
- Renault 6
- Alpine A106
- Alpine A108

== Cylinder dimensions and displacement ==
engine types	690	662-2 - 680	662-1	839	B1B - 670 - 800 - Ventoux1093
Bore	49 mm (1.93 in)	54.5 mm (2.15 in)	55 mm (2.17 in)	55.8 mm (2.20 in)	58 mm (2.28 in)
Stroke	80 mm (3.15 in)				
Displacement	0.6 L (603 cc)	0.7 L (747 cc)	0.8 L (760 cc)	0.8 L (782 cc)	0.8 L (845 cc)
