= Flins Renault Factory =

Car factory in France

Flins factory
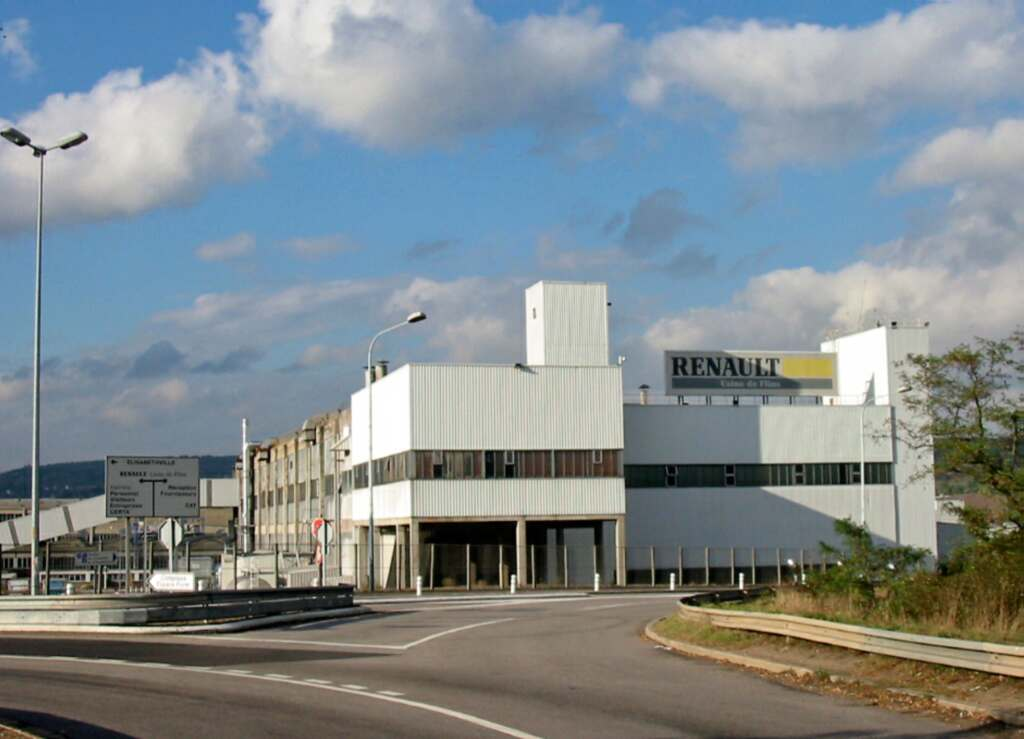
- Built: 1952
- Location: Plant of Flins, BP 203, 78410 Aubergenville, France; Flins, France
- Coordinates: 48.977147°N 1.86136°E
- Industry: Automotive
- Architect: Bernard Zehrfuss
- Area: 232 ha (570 acres)

The Flins Renault Factory is a car factory in France, straddling the towns of Flins and Aubergenville in Yvelines, approximately 40 kilometres (25 mi) from Paris. It is the largest (and, since the closure of the Boulogne-Billancourt factory, the oldest) Renault Group factory in mainland France. It was designed by the architect Bernard Zehrfuss and opened in 1952. It is 237 hectares (590 acres) in extent, of which 67 are occupied by covered buildings.

The factory is internally known as the Pierre Lefaucheux Factory in memory of Pierre Lefaucheux, Renault's first CEO following post-WWII nationalisation, who died in a single car accident in a Renault Frégate, manufactured at the Flins plant.

Between 1952 and the summer break of July 2009 the plant had assembled 16,850,000 vehicles.

== History ==
The Flins plant was part of a decentralisation plan for Renault with the aim of removing from the Billancourt plant the most repetitive and stressful tasks, which had caused several protests. The number of employees increased over the years, passing from 2,100 in 1953 to 10,600 in 1962. During the 1968 protests in France incidents were recorded around the factory.

Having in the past produced historic models such as the Dauphine, in 2009 125,400 Clios emerged from the Flins production line, although this was a lesser quantity than the 179,495 produced at Renault's Bursa plant that year.

The Flins plant produces numerous metal and plastic moulded components for use in Renault and Nissan factories worldwide which appears to give it a more secure future than some of the manufacturer's more recently constructed plants in France. In November 2009 it was confirmed that Flins would build the company's first electric powered volume model, based on the "Zoé" concept car. Considerable capacity is also being created for the manufacture and assembly of batteries in connection with this project.

As of 2013 the plant produces the fourth and third generation Renault Clio and the Renault Zoe. In 2013, it assembled 129,884 units. In 2017 the plant started producing the Nissan Micra, alongside the Zoe.

== Production history ==
- Renault Dauphine (1956-1967)
- Renault 5 (1972-1985)
- Renault Clio (1990-2020)
- Renault Twingo (1992-2021)
- Renault Zoe (2012-2024)
- Nissan Micra (2017-2022)
