= Renault Frégate =

Renault Frégate Renault Domaine Renault Manoir
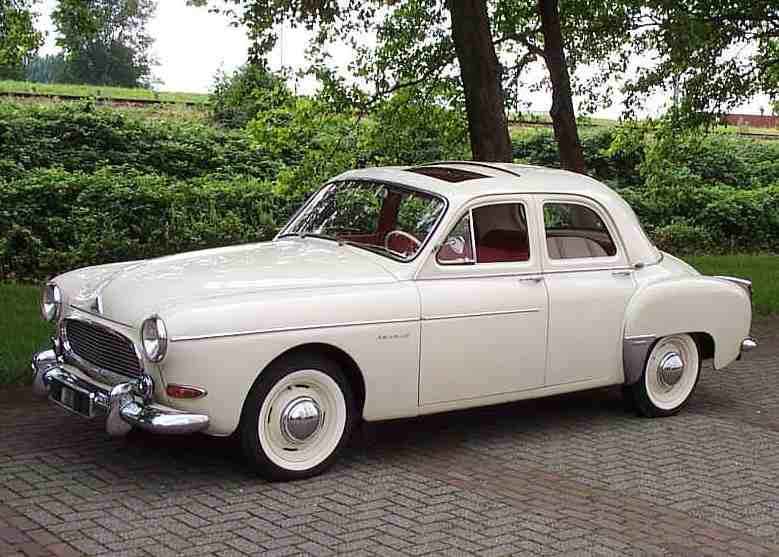
- 1959 Renault Frégate

Overview
- Manufacturer: Renault
- Production: November 1951 – April 1960
- Assembly: France: Flins

Body and chassis
- Class: Executive car (E)
- Body style: 4-door saloon (Frégate); 5-door estate (Domaine & Manoir)
- Layout: FR layout

Powertrain
- Engine: 1996 cc 668 I4; 2141 cc 671 Étendard I4
- Transmission: 4-speed manual 3-speed semi-automatic (optional from 1957)

Dimensions
- Wheelbase: 2,800 mm (110.2 in)
- Length: 4,700 mm (185.0 in)
- Width: 1,720 mm (67.7 in)
- Height: 1,540 mm (60.6 in)
- Kerb weight: 1,230 kg (2,712 lb)

Chronology
- Predecessor: Renault Vivastella; Renault Primaquatre

The Renault Frégate (French pronunciation: [fʁeɡat]) is an executive saloon car manufactured and marketed by the French automaker Renault from 1951 to 1960. Estate variants, the Renault Domaine and the Renault Manoir, were introduced in 1956 and 1958 respectively.

== Origins ==
The Frégate was conceived in the years immediately following World War II. Renault, which had recently been brought under the control of the French state, needed a new modern, upmarket model both to improve its image and to cater to the needs of middle-class consumers in the expected economic recovery. Before the Frégate design was put into production, several prototypes were created.

Initially, the car was to have had a rear-engined layout as in the recently launched 4CV, but Renault abandoned the rear-engined "Project 108" and in 1949, although it was late in the design process, decided to go with an engine mounted ahead of the driver. The engineering was thus rushed because of the switch to a front-engine configuration.

== Launch ==
Renault presented the Frégate at the 1950 Paris Motor Show, with the first production model delivered in November 1951. Manufacture took place at the assembly plant at Flins, which was renamed for Pierre Lefaucheux after his death, ironically in a single car accident in a Frégate. The plant formally opened in October 1952.

Production built up only slowly. Even in 1953, it was reported that the Frégate, with approximately 25,000 units sold on the French market, was comfortably outpaced by the standard wheelbase versions of Citroën Traction Avant, with approximately 35,000 sold that year, despite the Citroën being a pre-war design, little changed since its unveiling fifteen years earlier and, since the war, available only in black.

== Changes ==
From its appearance late in 1950 until 1953 the car was branded simply as the Frégate, but the nomenclature became more complicated at the Paris Motor Show in October 1952, and from early 1953 the Frégate was available in two trim levels, as the "Frégate Affaires" and the "Frégate Amiral", advertised at 799,300 francs and 899,000 francs respectively.

The "Frégate Amiral" was little changed from the previous year's Frégate, although the interior was slightly reworked and it did feature twin fog lights at the front whereas the previous year's model came with just a single fog light. Further minor external modifications for the October 1953 Motor Show included updated door handles and a change to the badge on the car's nose. The motif on the little shield was still diamond-shaped, but within the diamond, the image of a three-masted frigate ("frégate") had been replaced by a tiny outline map of mainland France containing the inscription "RNUR-France".

The "Frégate Affaires" offered a price saving of approximately 100,000 francs in return for a reduced specification that involved a simplified dashboard, reduced interior trim, the removal of exterior chrome over-riders from the bumpers as well as the loss of the twin fog lights and windscreen washer which remained a standard feature on the "Frégate Amiral" The launch of a cut-price Frégate was presumably part of the same strategy that was behind the launch of the cut-price 4CV Service. Neither of these stripped-down versions were well received by customers: in the Frégate's case, this was one of several attempts to make the model more competitive that failed to shake Citroën's dominance of the French market for large family cars.

The 2-litre type 668 engine produced 58 PS (43 kW) at 4,000 rpm. Along with a January 1955 facelift, the compression ratio was increased from 6.6:1 to 7:1, bumping power to 64 PS (47 kW). For 1956 (entering production in October 1955) Renault addressed the complaints about the lack of power from the 2-liter engine by introducing the bored out 2141 cc Étendard engine, which produced 77 PS (57 kW). A new, luxurious Grand Pavois trim package was launched the same year. The old engine continued to be available in the "Frégate 2 Litres", renamed Caravelle one year later and manufactured until October 1957. This was the end of the 2-litre engine in the sedan, but the Domaine (estate version) only changed over to the Étendard engine in February 1959.

In 1957 a three-speed 'Transfluide' semi-automatic transmission, incorporating a fluid coupling, became an option along with a slightly more powerful version of the 2141 cc engine producing 80 PS (59 kW) due to a compression ratio increase from 7.0:1 to 7.5:1.

The 1958 models saw another modified front grille. The prominent wide chrome oval and horizontal bars were removed to leave only the row of thin bars over which, since 1955, they had been placed.

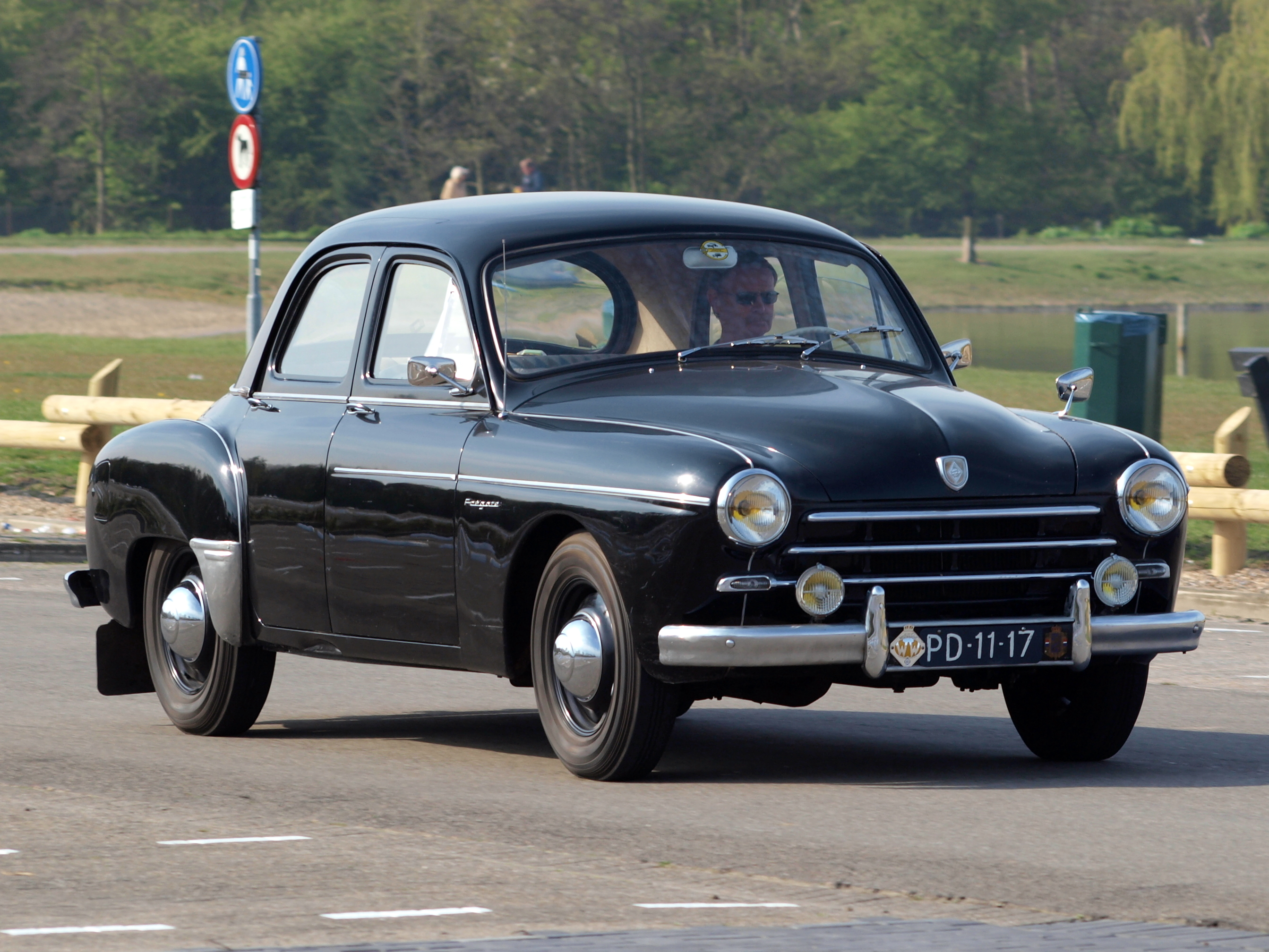
Renault Frégate (1953)

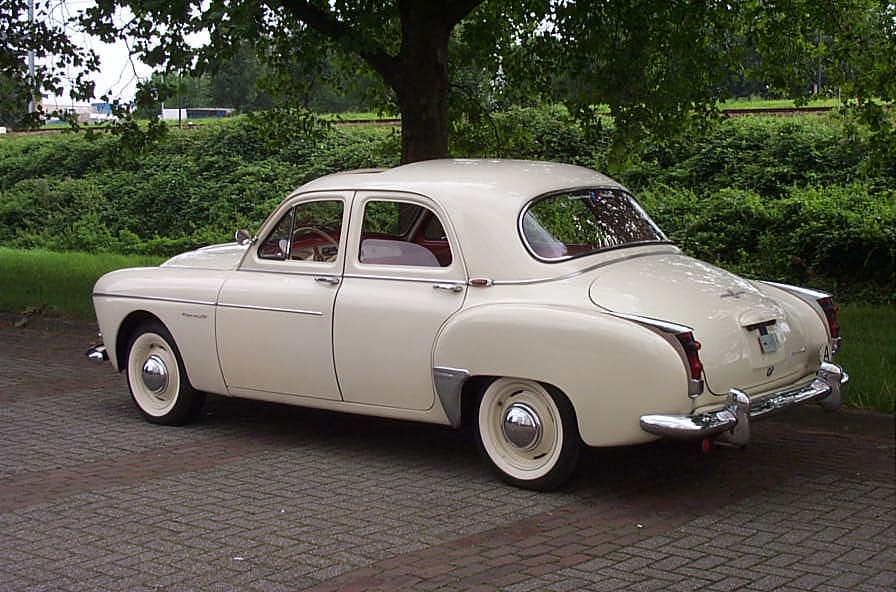
1959 Transfluide saloon

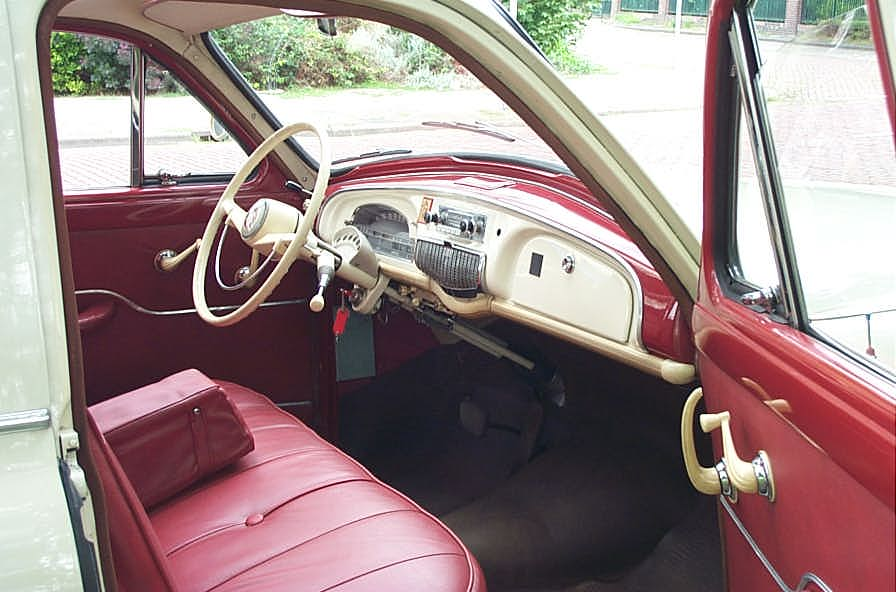
Interior of a 1959 Frégate

== Domaine and Manoir ==
An estate variant, the Renault Domaine was launched in 1956, with the 64 PS (47 kW) 2-litre engine. From February 1959 it was powered by the 2141 cc Étendard engine. A luxury estate, the Renault Manoir was presented in October 1958, featuring "Transfluide" automatic transmission included in the price.

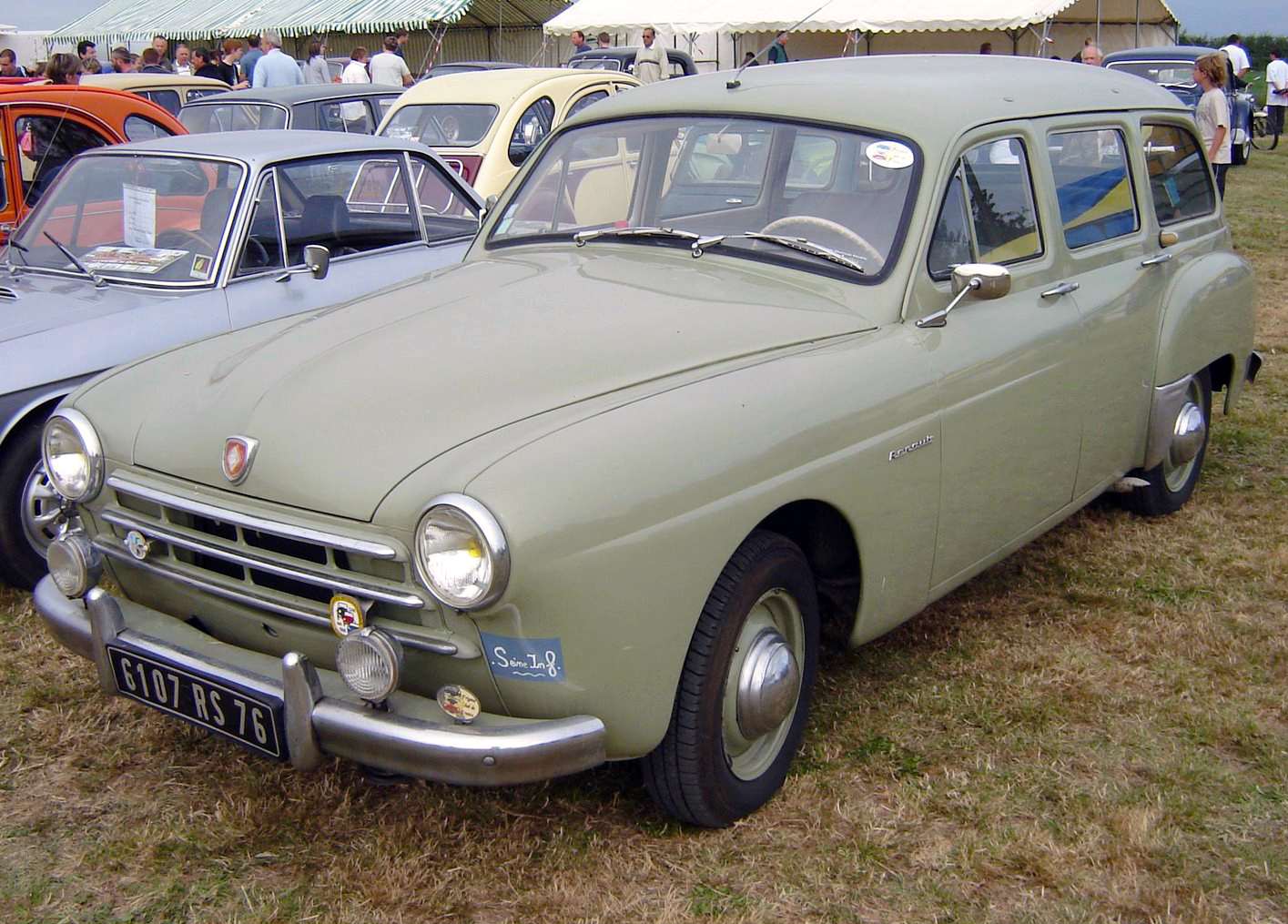
Renault Domaine

== Sales ==
Citroën reinforced their domination of the market for larger saloon cars in 1955 with the introduction of the futuristic DS, followed in 1957 by its more aggressively priced ID variant. Sales of the Frégate peaked in 1955 with 37,717 cars sold before slumping to 24,608 in 1956 and dropping to 9,772 in 1957: volumes failed to recover as competition from Simca and Citroën intensified in the large car sector through the later 1950s. On 18 April 1960, the final Frégate was assembled after 1,158 cars had been made that year. In total, 163,383 Frégates were made in the Flins-sur-Seine factory.

The sales performance of the car was regarded as disappointing. Some were content to blame the excessive number of teething troubles in the early models, the car's lack of power and, especially during the second half of the decade, the superior attractions of the Citroën offerings: but some commentators also draw attention to a very French political dimension. The manufacturer was nationalised directly after the war and the death in 1944 of Louis Renault took place under circumstances that were and have remained controversial. Many members of the (still relatively small) haute-bourgeoisie class able to afford such a car were simply more comfortable buying from a private manufacturer, especially after the Peugeot 403 was added to the Frégate's competitors. At the end of the decade Charles de Gaulle returned to power as president in 1958, and he was an unapologetically partisan fan of the Citroën DS, as newsreels of the period attest. Only a single long-wheelbase "presidential special" Renault Frégate exists.

== Production ==
Renault Frégate production (units):

- 1952 ... 18,153
- 1953 ... 25,192
- 1954 ... 34,258
- 1955 ... 37,631
- 1956 ... 24,608
- 1957
- 1958 .... 9,772
- 1959 .... 4,232
- 1960 .... 1,158

These data do not include the Domaine estate

== Replacement ==
Under an agreement concluded with American Motors Corporation (AMC) on 22 November 1961, Renault began selling the imported Rambler Classic Six (starting with the 1962 model year versions) badged as the Rambler Renault to replace the Frégate.

Starting on 11 April 1962, the Rambler Classics were assembled from CKD (Completely Knocked Down) kits at Renault's factory in Haren, Belgium. These executive cars were marketed by Renault in Algeria, Austria, Benelux, and France.
