= Pierre Dreyfus =

French civil servant (1907–1994)

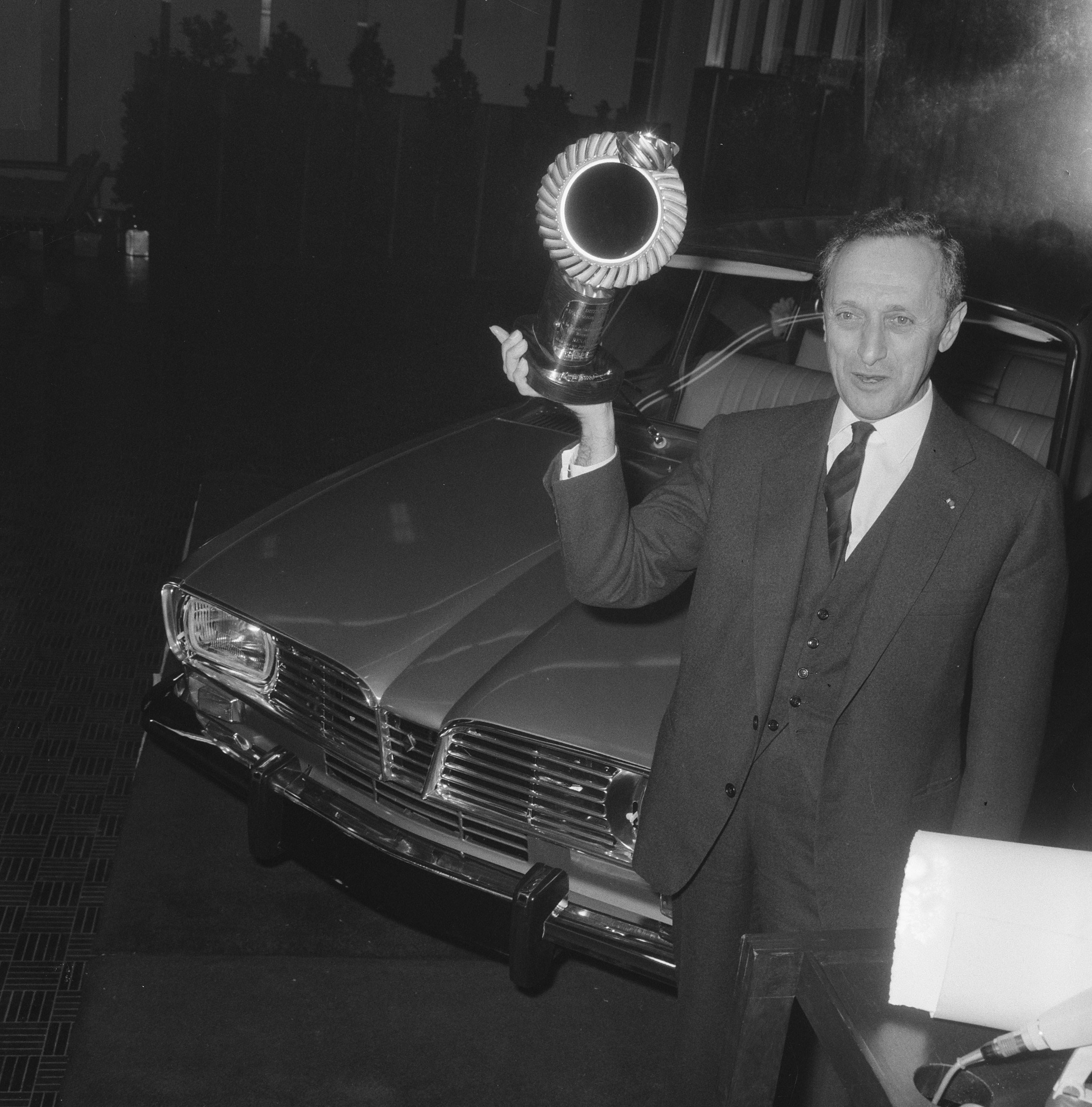
Pierre Dreyfus (1966)

Pierre Dreyfus (18 November 1907, Paris — 25 December 1994, Paris) was a high French civil servant who in 1955 became a wealthy businessman.

Between 1947 and 1955, he occupied senior administrative positions in the Ministry of Industry and Commerce, and in 1951 he became 'directeur de cabinet' at the ministry. Between 1948 and 1955, Dreyfus combined his civil service duties with the vice-presidency of the newly nationalised Renault auto business. On 11 February 1955 Pierre Lefaucheux died in a road accident and Dreyfus was appointed CEO of Renault. He retained the position until his retirement from the company in 1975.

Like Lefaucheux, Dreyfus secured his reputation in the top job at Renault by overseeing the launch and production of a model developed under his predecessor: in this case the commercial success was that of the Renault Dauphine. By the end of 1958, with Dreyfus less than three years into his time at the top, a million Renault 4CVs and half a million Dauphines had been sold. The following year, 1959, Renault ranked as the world's sixth largest auto-maker.

The collapse of North American demand for the Dauphine triggered a crisis for the company that was well-publicised, especially in the United States, with unsold Dauphines on North American docksides adding to the half million unsold Detroit built products clogging the US auto-market by the end of 1960: for Renault salvation arrived just in time in the form of the Renault 4, developed under Dreyfus and built at the rate of 1,000 cars a day by the end of 1962. During Dreyfus's twenty years in charge, Renault went on to consolidate its position as France's top selling car maker, gaining particular recognition in the 1960s for popularizing front wheel drive, hatchback sedans across Europe, most notably the 4, 5 and 16 models.

During the early years of the Mitterrand presidency, Dreyfus became active on the political scene, serving briefly as Industry Minister between June 1981 and June 1982 under prime minister Pierre Mauroy.

Pierre Dreyfus was related neither to French army officer Alfred Dreyfus, who was falsely accused of espionage in the Dreyfus Affair, nor to the race-driver Pierre Louis-Dreyfus.
