= Pierre Lefaucheux =

French industrialist (1898–1955)

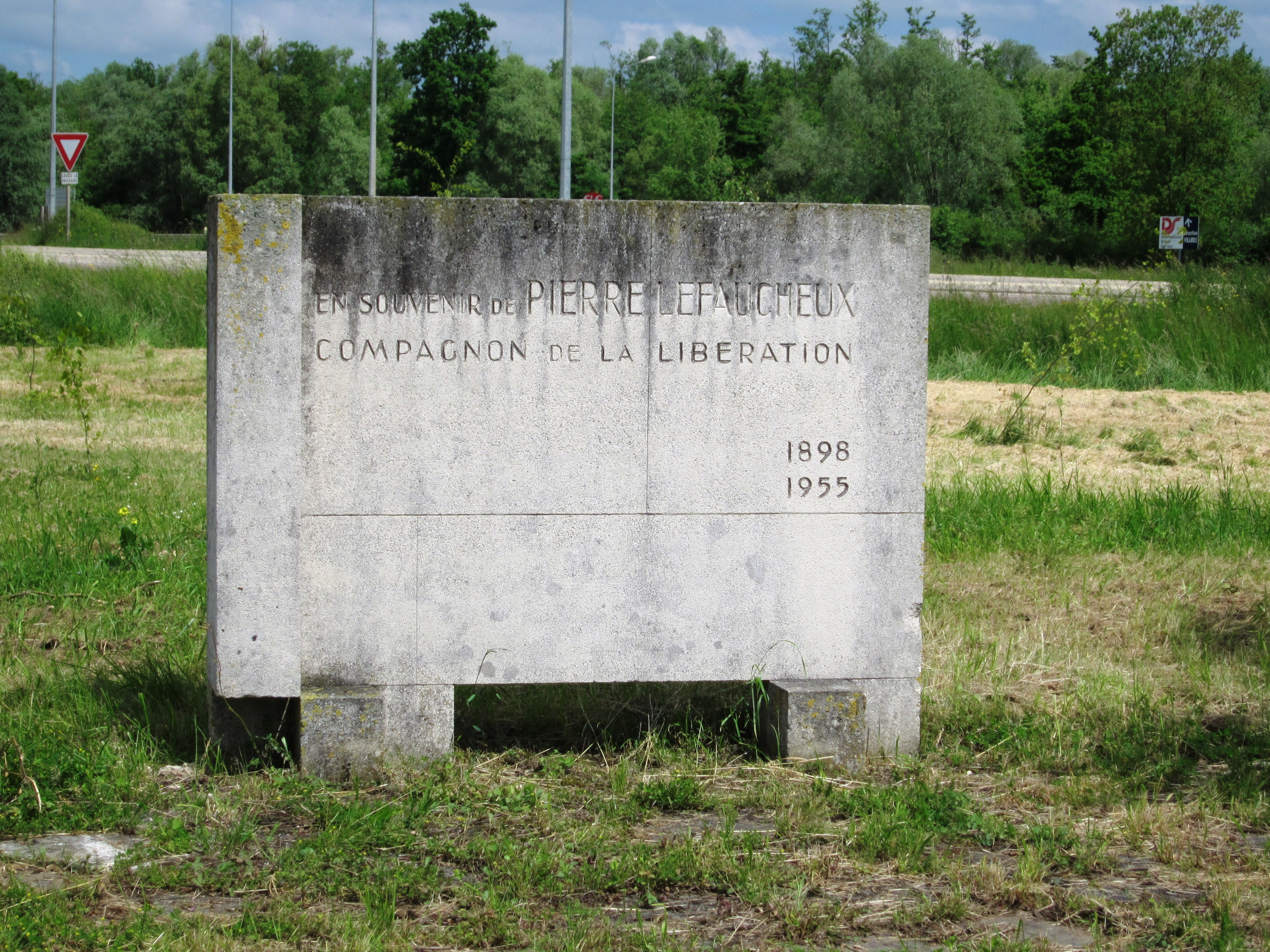
Monument to Pierre Lefaucheux, at the site of his fatal 1955 car accident. The monument is just off the highway west of Saint-Dizier, though the roads at the site of the actual accident have been subsequently reworked.

Pierre-André Lefaucheux (French pronunciation: [pjɛʁ ɑ̃dʁe ləfoʃø]; 30 June 1898 – 11 February 1955) was a leading French industrialist and recipient of the Order of Liberation, awarded to heroes of France's Liberation during World War II.

As the first chairman of Renault during the critical years after World War II, Lefaucheux died in an automobile accident in 1955 at age 56 – while directing the development of the forthcoming Renault Dauphine.

Lefaucheux was the subject of the 2009 biography, Patron de Renault, Pierre Lefaucheux (1944–1955) by Cyrille Sardais.

== Early years ==
Born at Triel-sur-Seine, and descended from the French inventor Casimir Lefaucheux, Lefaucheux was second of the four children of Pierre André Lefaucheux and Madeleine Dulac.

He volunteered for military service in September 1917, his record of military achievement in the First World War being crowned with his receipt of the Croix de Guerre.

Returning to civilian life, he enrolled at the École Centrale des Arts et Manufactures, obtaining his diploma in 1922. Lefacheux began his working life with a brief spell at the North France Railway Company, before joining in 1925 the Compagnie générale de construction de fours (General Boiler Manufacturing Company) where he would build his career until 1939, and where he became a director.

In parallel, he began in 1929 a doctoral thesis which he would submit in 1935 on the subject of “The peseta and the Spanish economy”.

== Resistance ==
War would again transform Lefaucheux's life. Called up in 1939, he was appointed Director for the Le Mans ammunition factory in January 1940.

His distinguished Resistance career was truncated when he was captured and imprisoned at Buchenwald.

== Renault ==
After the nationalisation of the Renault automobile business Lefaucheux took charge of the company in 1945. Lefaucheux had no great passion for cars, and even after being appointed to the top job at Renault he continued, for some time, to travel to work using his preferred form of locomotion, a pedal cycle. Lefaucheux set a pattern whereby Renault, despite now being a nationalised industry, ferociously rejected management by politicians: in this he was naturally able to draw on the network of influential former resistance leaders and fighters, many now in positions of power within the Fourth Republic French state. This was important at a time when France was ruled by a strongly dirigiste government, capable of implementing the Pons Plan which reflected government determination to structure the French auto-industry according to priorities identified by politicians and civil servants.

An important component of his leadership was the Renault 1955 Agreement with the French trade union Confédération Générale du Travail (CGT) that was developed under Lefaucheux and executed posthumously at Renault. The trade union agreement stabilized industrial relations for 20 years, including the avoidance of strikes and lockouts, and the linking of wages to living costs and thereby to inflation.

Lefaucheux's stewardship saw Renault becoming France's leading automobile manufacturer, with Lefaucheux directing the development of the commercially successful Renault 4CV — and up until the time of his death, its successor, the Renault Dauphine.

== Death ==
On Friday, 11 February 1955, Lefaucheux was scheduled to give a presentation to Catholic students in Strasbourg. Despite inclement icy weather, Lefaucheux, an avid motorist, decided at the last minute to travel by car — placing his suitcase not in the trunk, but on the rear seat of his Renault Frégate. Approaching Saint-Dizier from the West, on the Route Nationale 4 (N4), he encountered a detour, which at the last moment he tried to follow. The road surface was covered with black ice, the car spun, rolled over and landed on its side in a field. Though the Frégate's passenger cell was largely intact, Lafaucheux's unsecured suitcase on the rear seat had struck him in the neck, killing him instantly. In his pocket, he carried a train ticket for the trip.

See: The Renault Frégate in which Lefaucheux died.
Site of the Memorial to Pierre Lefaucheux: 48°38′26.55″N 4°55′3.52″E

By the time of his death, Lefaucheux had overseen almost the entire development of the Renault Dauphine, which would be presented at the Geneva Motor Show in March 1956. He was succeeded at Renault by the company's vice-president, Pierre Dreyfus.

A monument in Lefaucheux's memory was erected at the N4 near Saint-Dizier. The Renault Flins factory was renamed in his honor, as well as boulevards in Paris (in the Boulogne-Billancourt area near the Renault Billancourt headquarters) and Le Mans. He is buried at Saint-Quentin-des-Prés, in the Oise Department, and is a street named in his honour remains integral to the area of Paris formerly occupied by the Renault Boulogne-Billancourt works.

== Marie-Hélène Lefaucheux ==
Lefaucheux had been arrested by the Gestapo during World War II and was rescued by Marie-Hélène Postel-Vinay, whom he subsequently married and by whom he was ultimately survived. Pierre Lefaucheux and Marie-Hélène Lefaucheux had no children, as she had suffered an accident in her youth that prevented her from having children.

Together, Pierre and Marie-Hélène Lefaucheux became prominent members of the Resistance. Mrs. Lefaucheux later became a Member of the first Constituent Assembly (Aisne) of France, Counsel for the Republic elected by the National Assembly from 1946 to 1947, member of the French delegation to the United Nations. She was one of the fifteen founding members of the United Nations Commission on the Status of Women.

Her role in the Liberation of France was paraphrased in the 1966 film Is Paris Burning. Marie-Hélène Lefaucheux died in the 1964 New Orleans crash of Eastern Air Lines Flight 304.
