= Amédée Gordini =

French car builder and driver (1899–1979)

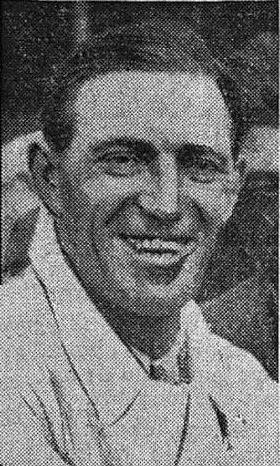
- Gordini in 1938
- Born: Amadeo Gordini; 23 June 1899
- Died: 25 May 1979 (aged 79)

Amedeo "Amédée" Gordini (23 June 1899 – 25 May 1979) was an Italian-born race car driver and sports car manufacturer in France.

== Biography ==
Gordini was born in Bazzano, currently part of the Metropolitan City of Bologna in the Emilia-Romagna region of northern Italy. He was a young boy when he became fascinated with automobiles and racing. In his early teens, he worked as a mechanic for Alfieri Maserati. After serving in the Italian army during World War I, in 1926 he married and settled in Paris, France: parenthood quickly followed. In France, he raced Fiat cars in Grand Prix motor racing events and at the 24 hours of Le Mans. He was a particular fan of the Fiat Balilla, released in early 1932. Using a Balilla chassis he developed a unique roadster which he used in his first races.

In 1934 Gordini approached Henri Pigozzi, Fiat's French "General Representative". Pigozzi was a close friend and business partner of Giovanni Agnelli, Fiat's owner. Since 1928 Pigozzi had been assembling Fiats at Suresnes, in France, using a combination of imported and locally sourced components. In November 1934 Pigozzi's Fiat assembly business relocated to larger premises at Nanterre, and out of this Simca was born. Gordini had already established a strong reputation as a racing driver and as an engineer with a specialist's understanding of Fiats. A bond between Gordini and Pigozzi existed naturally, partly because they were both Italian expatriates who had moved to France after the war. Gordini rapidly found himself the head of the Simca motor racing department. He quickly showed a flair for improving the performance from the cars' basic Fiat designed engines without incurring massive expenditure, acquiring the sobriquet "le sorcier de la mécanique" (roughly "the mechanic- wizard"), and staying with Simca till 1951. From the 1940s, his son Aldo joined his racing team as a mechanic and occasional driver.

The break with Simca arose over the extent of the manufacturer's support for Simca-Gordini participation at the top level of motor racing, including Formula 1. In 1952 Gordini founded the independent Gordini company to build a line of sports cars for racing. In 1953 the government of France awarded Amédée Gordini the Legion of Honor.

The cars that Gordini sent to the race track in Le Mans were very fast. Gordini's engine tuner, also called the “sorcerer”, breathed Grand Prix performance into regular engines - a feat no one believed possible. The Musée National de l'Automobile de Mulhouse in Mulhouse, France featuring the Schlumpf Collection has in its collection Grand Prix and road racing cars of the Gordini brand. Exhibits include a type 16 Grand Prix from 1954, a single seater type 32 from 1956 and the Gordini 26 S, the car driven by the famous French author Françoise Sagan.

Despite racing successes, after World War II, obtaining adequate financial support for racing had become increasingly difficult, and the business struggled financially without the backing of Pigozzi. Timely salvation appeared in 1957 when Renault engaged Gordini. During the final two decades of his career his technical skills were combined with the financial muscle of France's largest automaker to give birth to a succession of performance versions of mass market cars, starting with the Renault Dauphine and including the Renault Caravelle, Renault 5 Alpine Turbo, Renault 8, Renault 12 and the Renault 17.

In Brazil, technical changes in the Brazilian version of Renault Dauphine, manufactured by Willys-Overland, caused the company to rename this car model in 1962, releasing it with the popular nickname Gordini.

Gordini died after several months of acute illness at the end of May 1979, in Paris, less than a month short of his eightieth birthday. He was buried in the Montmartre Cemetery. He died a few weeks too early to be present for the first Formula 1 victory of the Renault V6 turbo racing engine, developed by the Renault Sport division into which he had merged his own company, and which he had built up since 1969.
