= Flins-sur-Seine =

- Commune
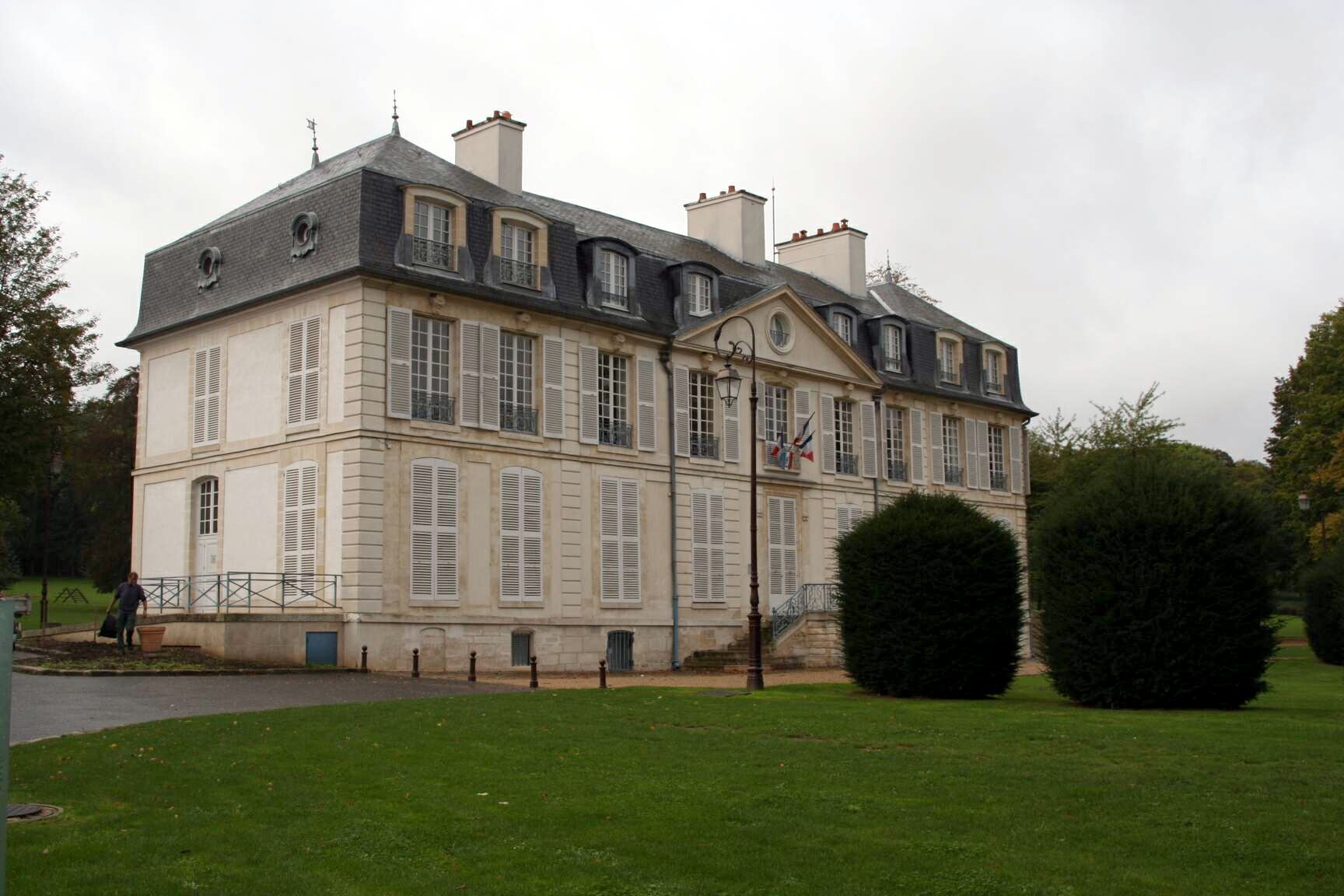
- Town hall

- Coat of arms
- Location of Flins-sur-Seine
- Location within France Location within Île-de-France (region)
- Coordinates: 48°57′55″N 1°52′25″E
- Country: France
- Region: Île-de-France
- Department: Yvelines
- Arrondissement: Mantes-la-Jolie
- Canton: Aubergenville
- Intercommunality: CU Grand Paris Seine et Oise

Government
  - Mayor (2020–2026): Philippe Mery
- Area^{1}: 8.61 km^{2} (3.32 sq mi)
- Elevation: 39 m (128 ft)
- Highest elevation: 179 m (587 ft)
- Lowest elevation: 19 m (62 ft)
- Population (2023): 2,447
  - Density: 284/km^{2} (736/sq mi)
- Time zone: UTC+01:00 (CET)
  - Summer (DST): UTC+02:00 (CEST)
- INSEE/Postal code: 78238 /78410
- ^{1} French Land Register data, which excludes lakes, ponds, glaciers > 1 km^{2} (0.386 sq mi or 247 acres) and river estuaries.

Flins-sur-Seine (French pronunciation: [flɛ̃ syʁ sɛn]) is a commune in the Yvelines department in the Île-de-France in north-central France.

== Population ==
Historical population
Year	Pop.	±% p.a.
1968	1,423	—
1975	1,805	+3.46%
1982	1,776	−0.23%
1990	2,130	+2.30%
1999	2,207	+0.40%
2007	2,396	+1.03%
2012	2,353	−0.36%
2017	2,410	+0.48%
2023	2,447	+0.25%
Source: INSEE

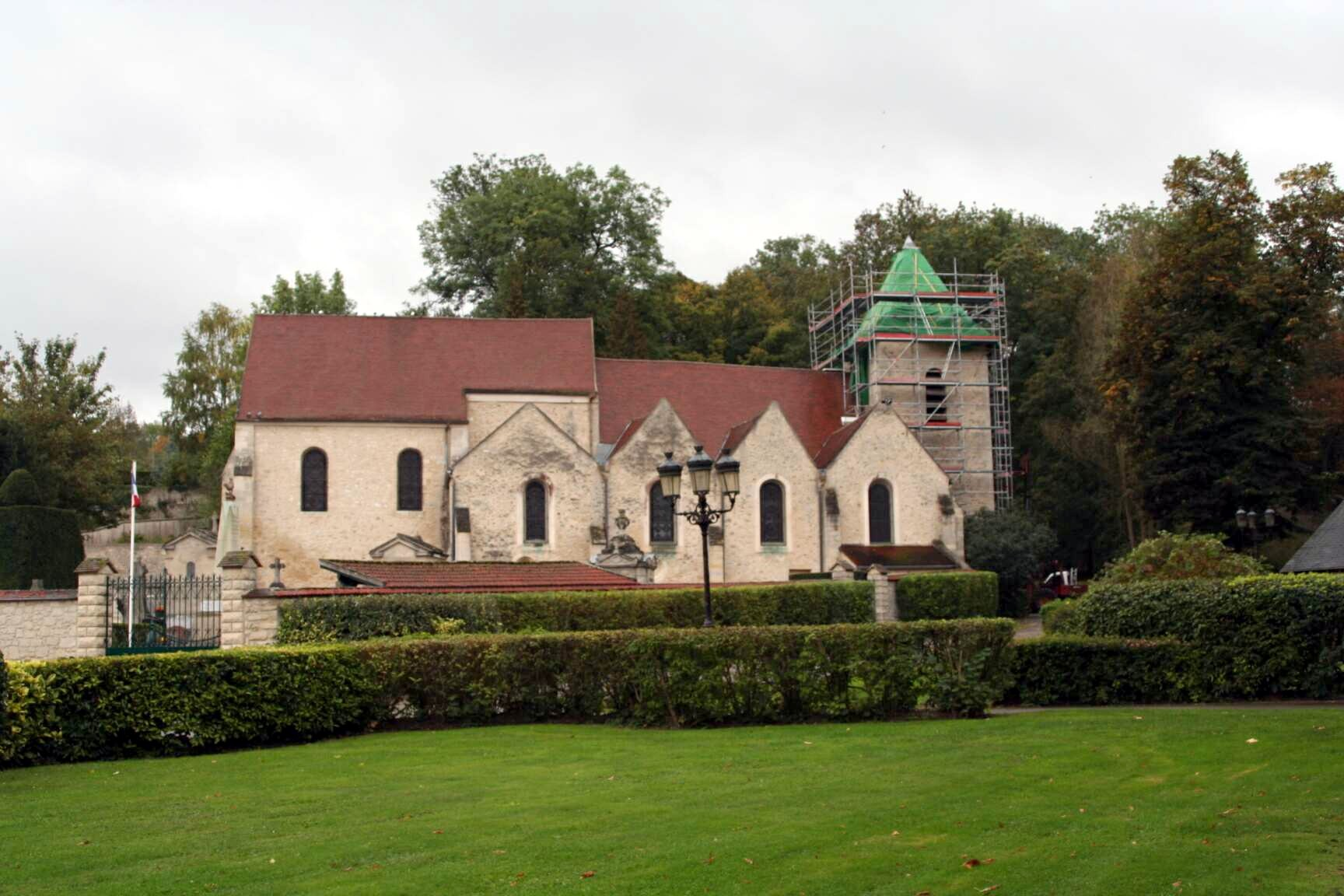
Saint-Cloud

== See also ==
- Communes of the Yvelines department
