= Renault Clio =

Supermini car range produced by Renault

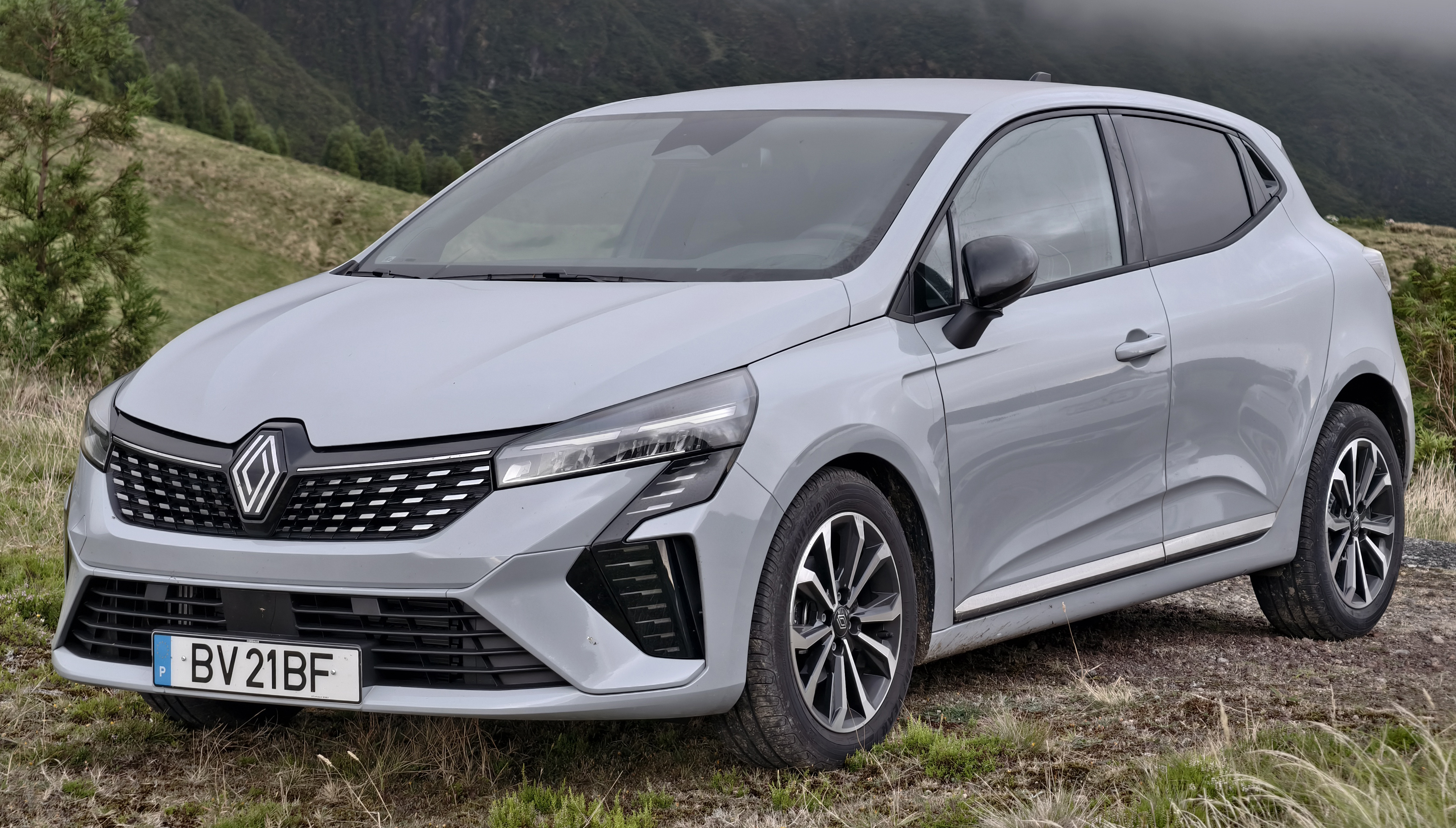
- Fifth generation Renault Clio (2023 facelift)

Overview
- Manufacturer: Renault
- Also called: Renault Lutecia (Japan); Mitsubishi Colt (2023–2025)
- Production: 1990–present

Body and chassis
- Class: Supermini (B)
- Body style: 3-door hatchback (Clio I – III); 5-door hatchback (1990–present); 4-door sedan (Clio II); 5-door estate (Clio III & IV)
- Layout: Front-engine, front-wheel-drive

Chronology
- Predecessor: Renault 5

The Renault Clio (/ˈkli.oʊ/) KLEE-oh is a supermini (B-segment) car, produced by French automobile manufacturer Renault. It was launched in 1990, and entered its sixth generation in 2025. The Clio has had substantial critical and commercial success, being consistently one of Europe's top-selling cars since its launch, and it is largely credited with restoring Renault's reputation and stature after a difficult second half of the 1980s. The Clio is one of only two cars, the other being the Volkswagen Golf, to have been voted European Car of the Year twice: in 1991 and in 2006.

The car is named after Clio, one of the nine Muses in Greek mythology. In Japan, it is sold as the Renault Lutecia because Honda retains the rights to the name Clio after establishing the Honda Clio sales channel in 1984. Lutecia is derived from Lutetia, an ancient Roman city that was the predecessor of Paris. The Renault Lutecia was formerly available through Yanase Co., Ltd., but in 1999 Renault purchased a stake in Japanese automaker Nissan. Following Renault's takeover, distribution rights for the Lutecia were handed over to Nissan in 2000, and the car was sold at Nissan's "Red Stage" dealerships.

== First generation (X57; 1990) ==
Clio I
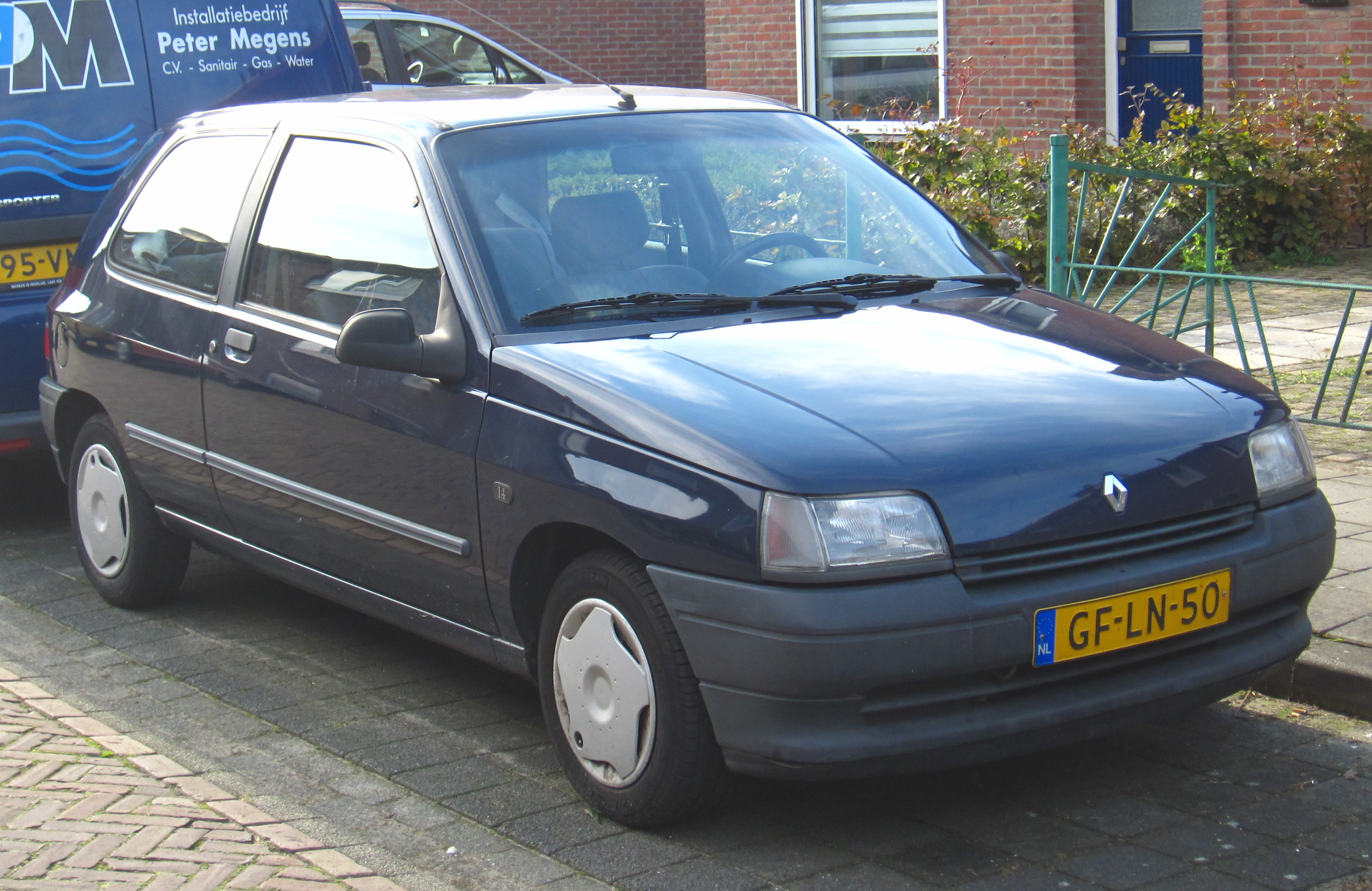

Overview
- Model code: X57
- Also called: Renault Lutecia (Japan)
- Production: 1990–1998 (France); 1996–2001 (Colombia)
- Assembly: France: Flins, Yvelines (Flins Renault Factory); Argentina: Córdoba, Cordoba Province (Renault Argentina); Colombia: Envigado, Antioquia (SOFASA); Slovenia: Novo Mesto, Lower Carniola (REVOZ); Spain: Valladolid, Castile and León (Renault Valladolid Factory); Portugal: Setubal, Lisbon Region; Belgium: Vilvoorde, Flemish Brabant, (RIB)

Body and chassis
- Body style: 3/5-door hatchback

Powertrain
- Engine: Petrol: 1108 cc C1E I4; 1149 cc D7F I4; 1171 cc E5F/E7F I4; 1390 cc E6J/E7J I4; 1565 cc C2L I4; 1721 cc F2N I4; 1764 cc F7P 16v I4; 1794 cc F3P I4; 1998 cc F7R 16v I4; Diesel: 1870 cc F8Q I4
- Transmission: 4 or 5-speed manual 3 or 4-speed automatic

Dimensions
- Wheelbase: 2,472 mm (97.3 in)
- Length: 3,709 mm (146.0 in)
- Width: 1,616 mm (63.6 in) (1990–1996); 1,625 mm (64.0 in) (1996–1998)
- Height: 1,360 mm (53.5 in)
- Curb weight: 930 kg (2,050 lb)

Renault had replaced its R5 supermini with a completely redesigned model (which had similar styling to the 1972 original) in 1984, but soon afterwards began working on an all-new supermini to take the company into the 1990s. It was eventually decided that the new car would feature a name designation, rather than the numeric model designations which Renault had traditionally used – this would be adopted across the entire Renault range by 1995. Cars like the Fuego coupe (launched in 1980) had been an exception to this rule, and the last "numeric" Renault was the 19, launched in 1988, and by the end of 1996 the numeric model designations had completely disappeared from the Renault range in Western Europe.

The Clio was introduced at the Paris Motor Show in June 1990 and sales in France and the rest of the continent began then, although sales in right-hand drive Britain did not begin until March 1991. The Clio was the replacement to the hugely successful Renault 5, although this car remained in production until 1996 at a factory in Slovenia, where some versions of the Clio were later built. The Clio's suspension and floorpan were largely the same as the R5, which was derived from the R9 saloon of 1981 and R11 hatchback of 1983 – not that of the original 1972 Renault 5, despite the later R5 visually resembling the original model.

The suspension uses half-width torsion bars (full-width on higher spec models) with trailing arms at the rear, and coil sprung MacPherson struts, attached to a thick pressed steel subframe at the front. The engine range available at launch included 1.2 L and 1.4 L E-type "Energy" petrol inline-four engines (first seen in the Renault 19) and 1.7 L and 1.9 L diesel engines, both based on the F-type unit. The petrol engines gradually had their carburettors replaced with electronic fuel injection systems by the end of 1992, in order to conform to ever stricter pollutant emission regulations brought in by the EEC.

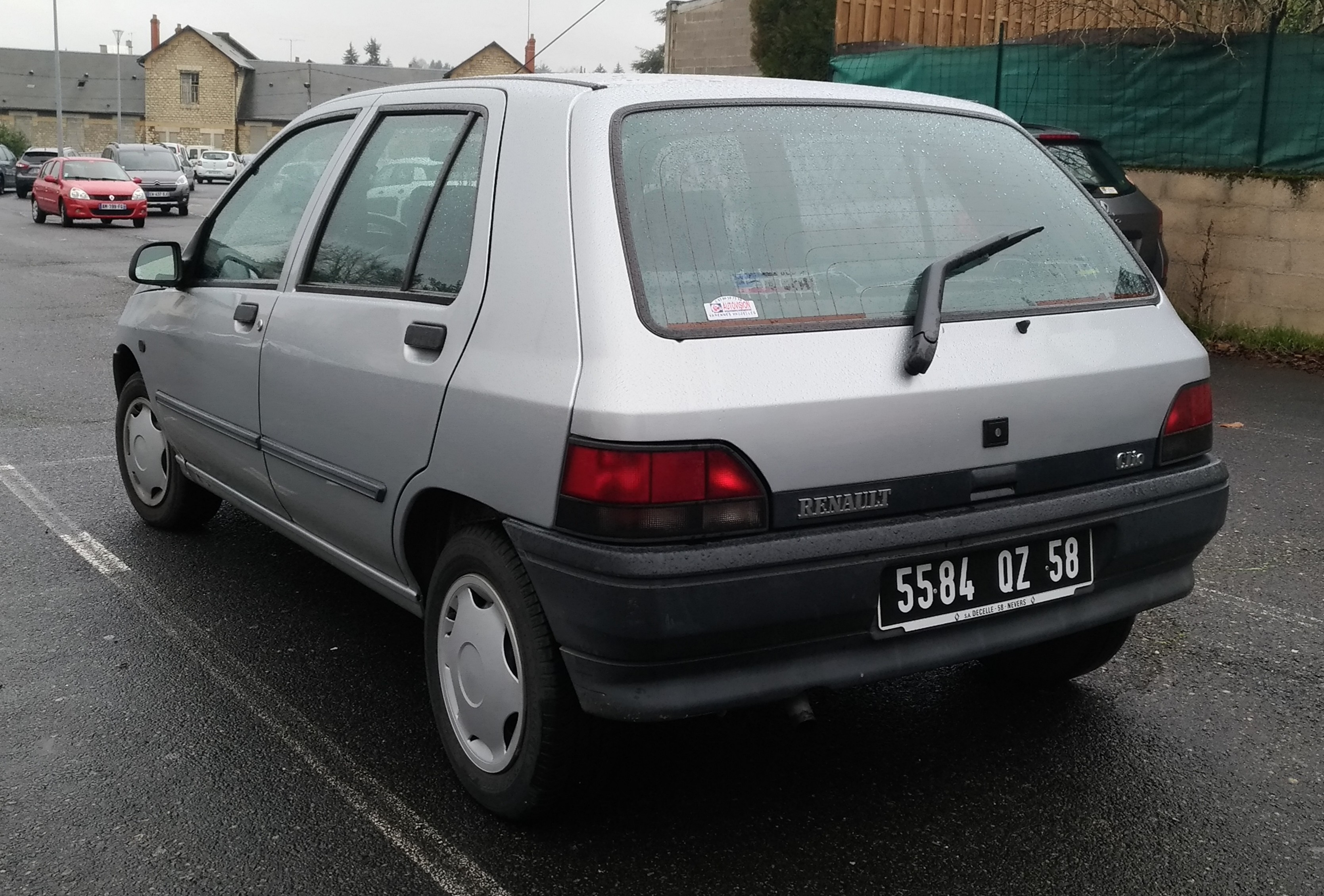
Phase 1 Clio (1990–94)

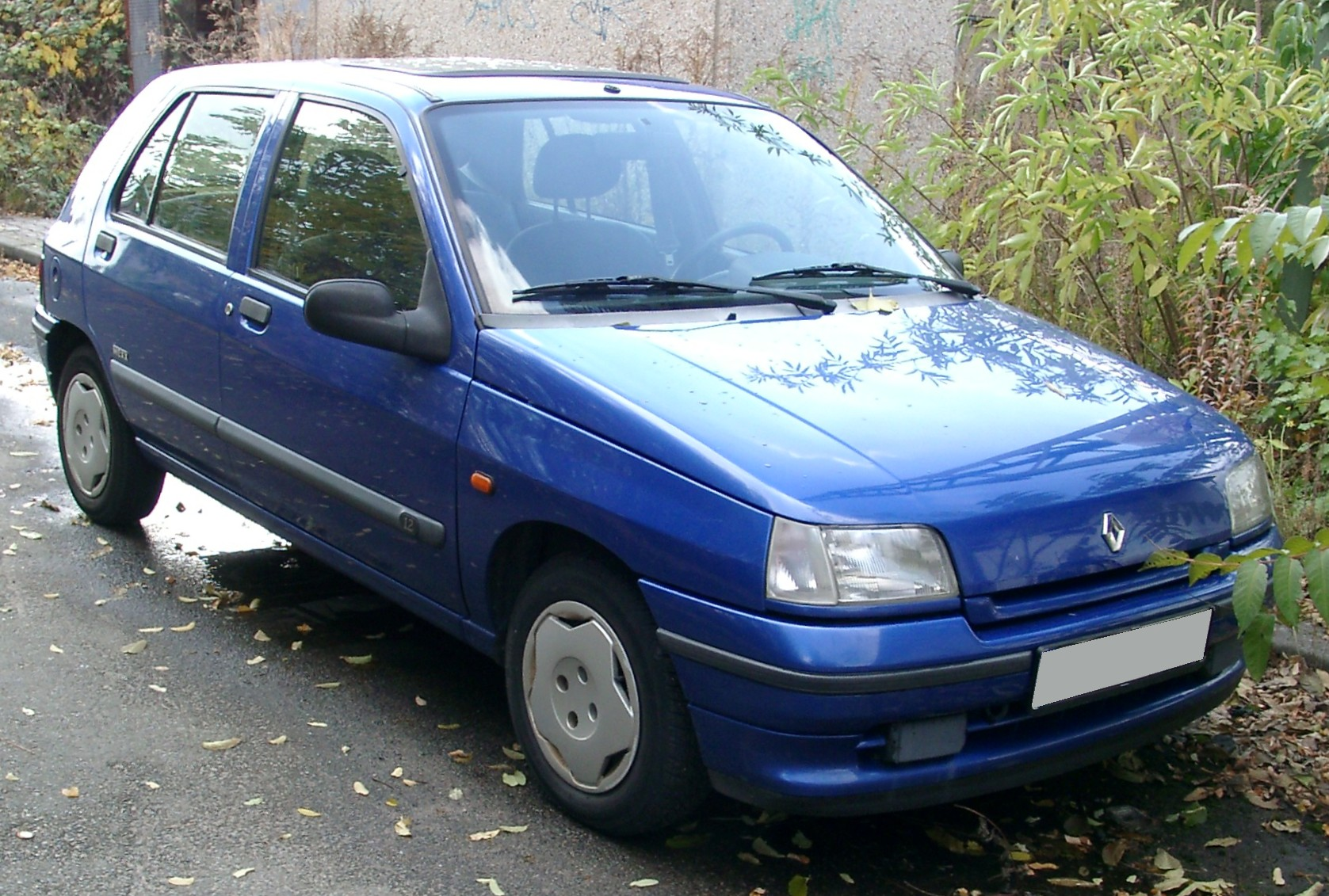
Phase 2 Clio (1994–96)

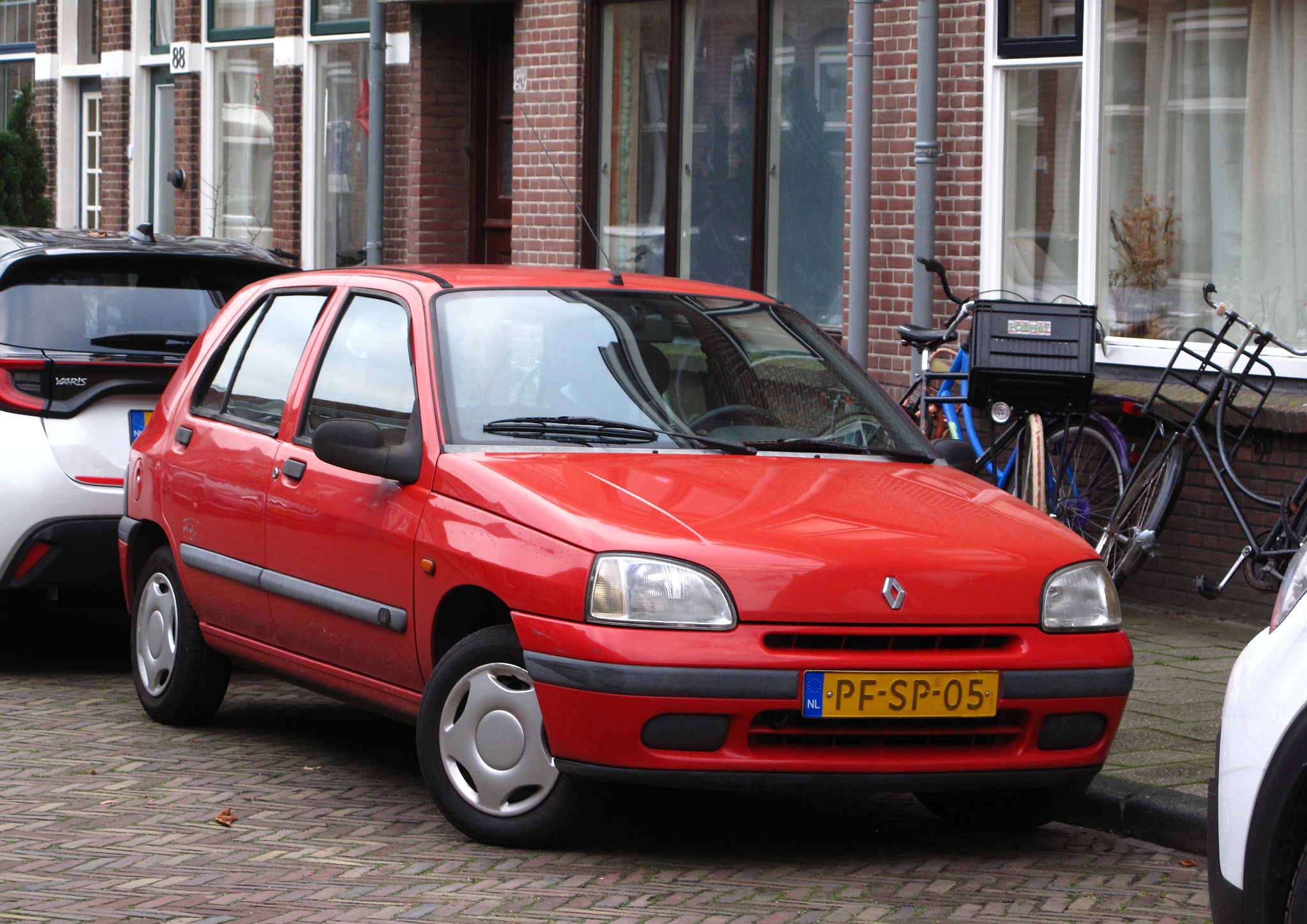
Phase 3 Clio (1996–98)

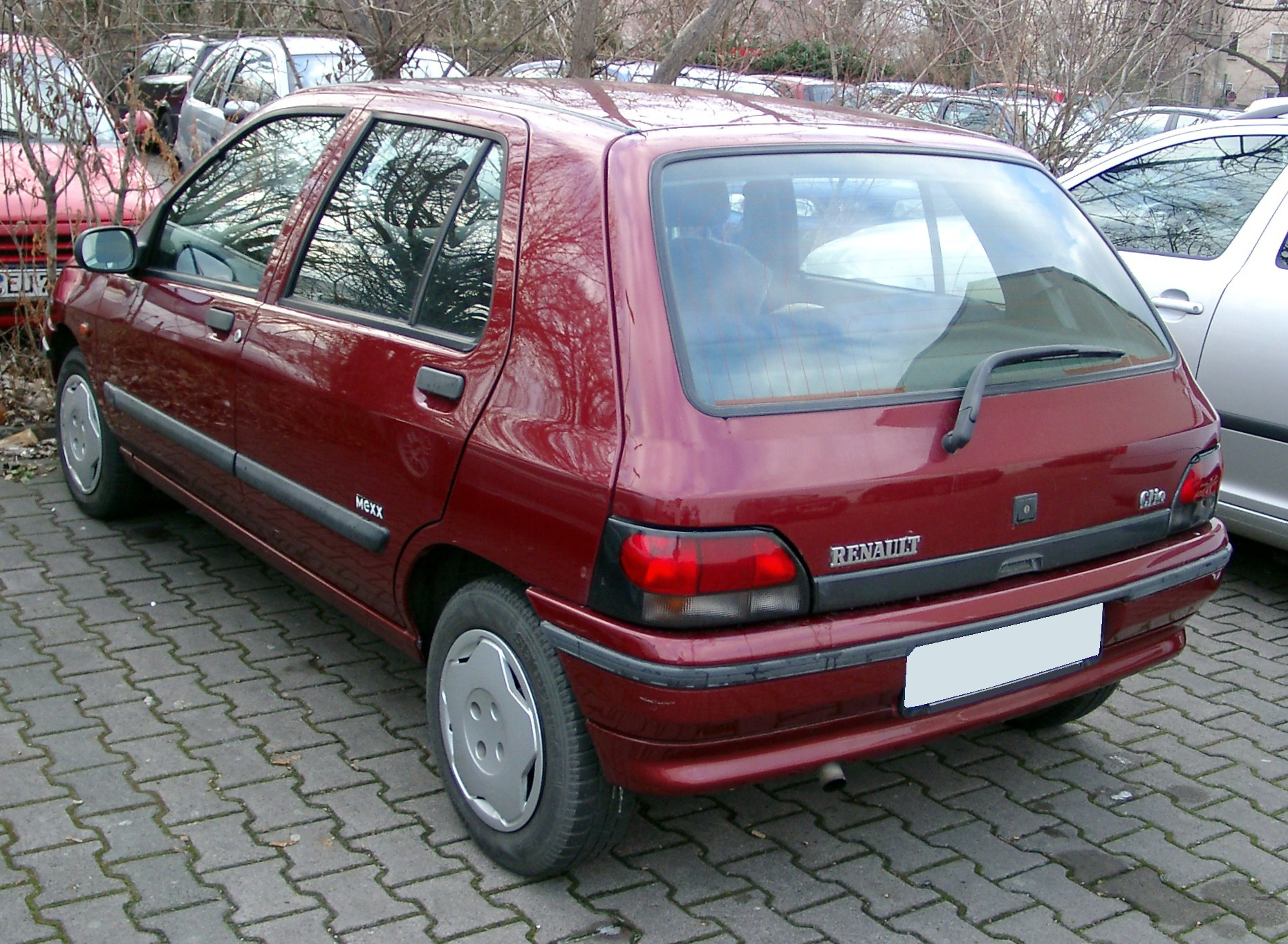
Rear view of the Phase 2 Clio

A minor trim facelift occurred after only a year of being on sale. A new "smooth" version of the Renault diamond badge (the previous "ribbed" badge was being phased out at the time) and a new front seat design were the only changes. The altered design did not constitute a new "phase". In March 1994 (at the Geneva Motor Show), the phase two model was launched, with small updates to the exterior and interior of the Clio. Most noticeable was the change in the front grille from two metal ribs to a single colour-coded slat. The bump strips were made slightly larger and rounder and had the car's trim level badge incorporated into them. The badges on the tailgate strip were moved up onto the tailgate itself and the tailgate strip was given a carbon fibre look. The rear light clusters were given a slightly more rounded bubble shape, giving the Clio a more modern look. The clusters, however, are physically interchangeable with phase ones'.

In May 1996, with the arrival of the phase three facelifted Clio, the 1.2 L Energy engine was replaced by the 1,149 cc D7F MPi (multi point injection) DiET engine, first used in the Renault Twingo; for some time also, versions were available with the older 1239 cc "Cléon" unit from the original Twingo. The cylinder head design on the 1.4 L E-type was also slightly altered for the phase three models in a bid for better fuel economy. This resulted in the engines producing slightly less power than their earlier versions.

The phase three Clios have a slightly more noticeable update than the phase twos. The phase three has different, more rounded headlights, incorporating the turn signal in the unit with the headlight, and the bonnet curves more around the edges of the lights. The tailgate incorporates a third brake light and a new script "Clio" name badge, following the same typeface as contemporary Renaults. Some mechanical improvements were also made, as well as the introduction of side impact bars and airbags, which became common features on mainstream cars across Europe.

Renault also released a hot hatch version of the Clio in 1991. It was aesthetically very similar, but with the addition of an 110 PS (81 kW) 1.8 L eight-valve engine, side skirts and disc brakes on all wheels. This, with multi-point fuel injection, was badged as the RSi. From 1991 a lighter tuned version of this 1.8 litre engine (with single-point injection) joined the earlier 1.7 used in the very luxurious Baccara version which was sold in some continental European markets. In addition to this reasonably powerful engine, the Baccara has a luxurious interior with much leather and wood, as well as power windows, locks, etc. The Baccara was renamed "Initiale" in 1997, in line with other Renaults, differing from the Baccara mainly in the wheel design.

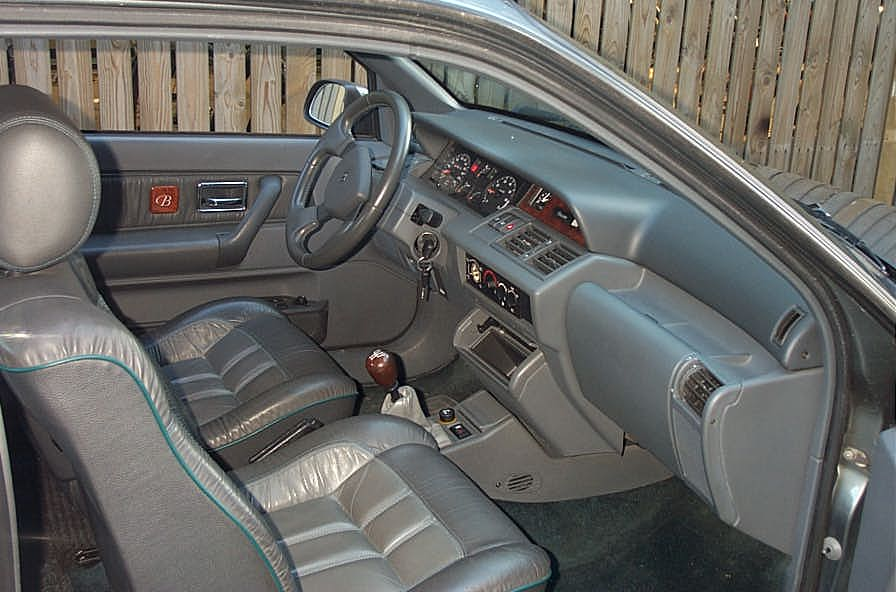
Interior of 1993 Clio Baccara

During 1991, a fuel injected 1.8 L 16-valve engine producing 137 PS (101 kW) (which had debuted on the Renault 19) capable of propelling the car to 209 km/h (130 mph) was introduced to the Clio engine range, known simply as the Clio 16S in France (S for "soupapes", the French word for valves), and Clio 16V in export markets. It was the successor to the Renault 5 GT Turbo, which was discontinued that year as the R5 range was pruned back. As well as having a higher top speed than a regular Clio, the 16S sports wider plastic front wings, an offset bonnet vent, wider rear arches and uprated suspension and brakes, and colour-coded front mirrors and bumpers. The RSi side skirts were omitted, however. Inside, the 16V model has an extended instrument panel that houses dials for engine oil pressure, oil temperature, and oil level (which only indicates on engine start). The seats are also more supportive to match the sporting nature of the model. The non-catalyzed versions, still available in some markets, offer 140 PS (103 kW) and marginally higher performance with top speeds up to 212 km/h (132 mph) and the 0–100 km/h (62 mph) time dropping from 8 to 7.8 seconds.

In December 1990, the Clio was voted European Car of the Year for 1991, and soon became one of Europe's best-selling cars, as well as the first Renault to be consistently among the top-10 best sellers in the United Kingdom, where it was selling in excess of 50,000 units a year by 1995. UK sales were helped by a famous television advertising campaign by Publicis shot in France, featuring the two main characters of Papa and Nicole, played by Max Douchin and Estelle Skornik respectively.

From 1991 to 1993, trim levels were identical in every European country. Starting in 1993, trim levels designations became more varied across the various markets. The car was sold as the Renault Lutecia (from Lutetia, the Latin name for Paris) in Japan, as "Clio" was used there by Honda for one of their domestic marketing networks.

=== Clio Williams ===
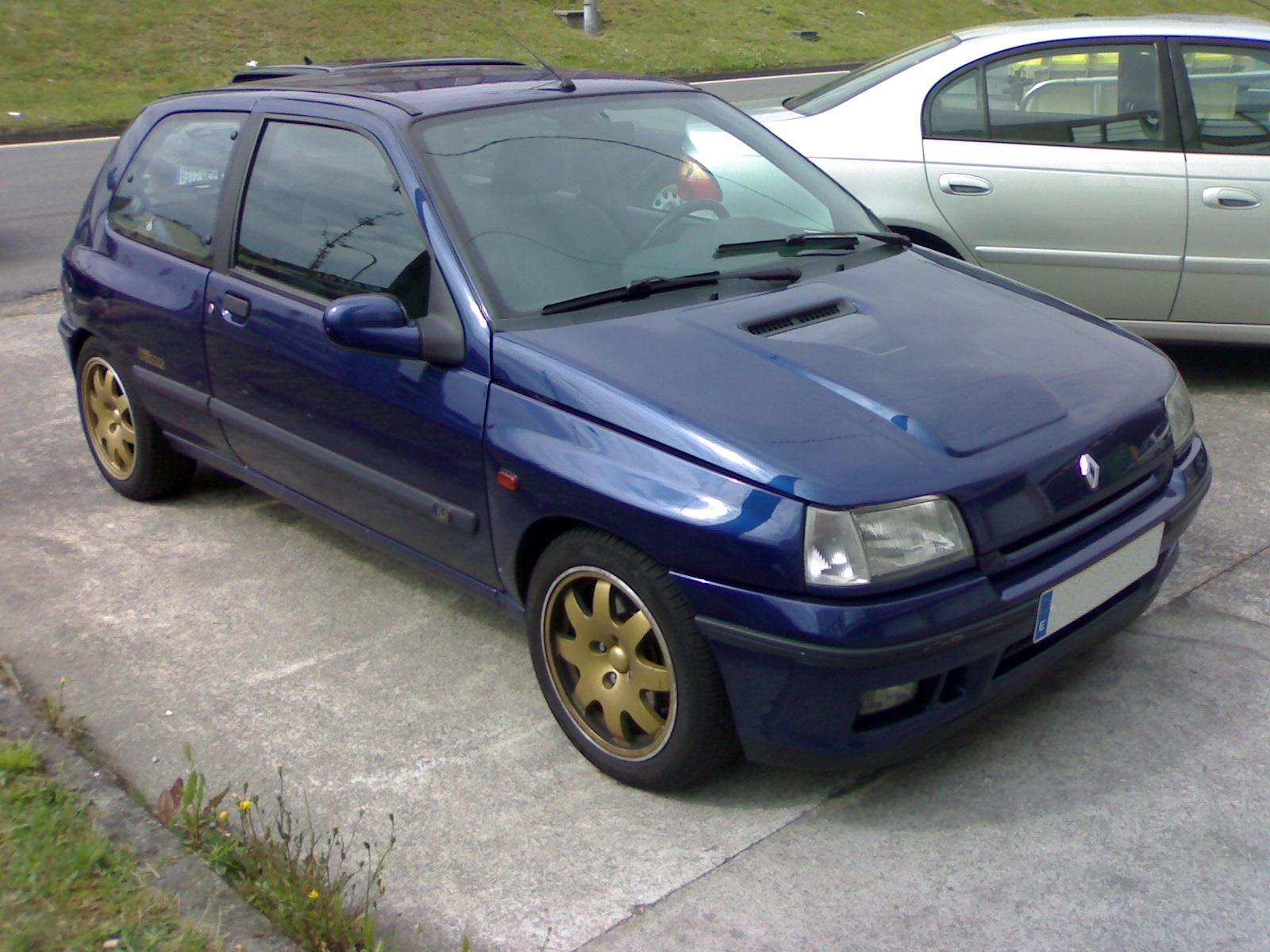

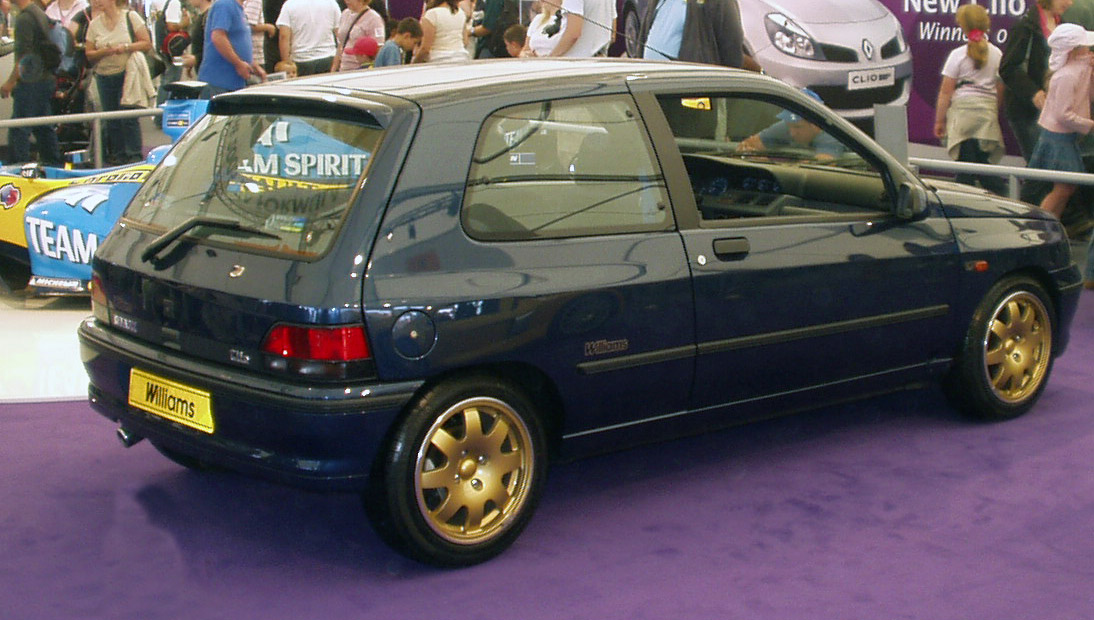
Clio Williams

In 1993, Renault launched the Clio Williams as a limited edition of 3,800 cars – 1,300 more than they needed for homologation purposes – with each car bearing a numbered plaque on the dash. These sold out so quickly that Renault ended up building 1,600 more.

After the first series, due to the demand, Renault built the Williams 2 and 3, with more than 12,000 eventually being built. However, many new road cars were directly converted to race cars and when damaged replaced with another converted road car, which means that the actual number of road cars is significantly lower than the figures suggest.

The car was named after the then Renault-powered Formula One team WilliamsF1, though Williams had nothing to do with the design or engineering of this Clio. The modifications to the Clio 16S on which it was based were the work of Renault Sport, Renault's motorsport division. Nevertheless, this car had a Formula One link by being the sport's Safety Car in 1996.

The naturally aspirated 1,998 cc (2.0 L; 121.9 cu in) DOHC 4 valves per cylinder fed by Multipoint fuel injection Inline-four engine, was rated at 150 PS (110 kW; 148 hp) at 6,100 rpm and 175 N⋅m (129 lb⋅ft) at 4,500 rpm of torque. It has a top speed of 215 km/h (134 mph) equipped with performance-tuned ride and handling. Renault later released the Williams 2 and Williams 3 special editions, much to the chagrin of those owners who had been assured of the exclusivity of the "original" Williams. One common mistake people can make is thinking that the 2.0 16V (F7R) used in the Williams is simply a bored out 1.8 16V (F7P), whereas, in reality the large engine had different size valves, cams, stroked crank and engine oil cooler. Other differences between the Williams and the Clio 16S it is based on include a wider front track with wishbones similar, but not the same as the Renault 19, wider Speedline alloys, uprated (JC5) gearbox, bespoke four-to-one manifold, firmer suspension, and some cosmetic differences on the exterior and interior.

The differences between the three versions of the Williams were largely a reflection of phase changes across the Clio range, e.g. the gradual addition of enhanced safety features and cosmetic variations. Other than this, the Williams 1 and 2 had no sunroof and were painted in 449 Sports Blue. The final Williams 3 was painted in a slightly brighter shade of blue (432 Monaco Blue) and finally gained a sunroof which had long been standard on virtually all previous Clios. The original Williams was the lightest of the three, lacking the electrics necessary for the sunroof or the mirrors, and was the only one to support a metal plaque stating the build number.

The Renault Clio Williams was and still is a very popular rally car. The basic racing version (Gr.N) had racing suspension, different engine management, and a more free flowing exhaust. Power output was around 121 kW (165 PS). Roll cage was made by Matter France. Bucket seats were made by Sabelt.

The next step up was the Group A car, which was fitted with 16-inch Speedline 2012 rims (with optional extractors), further improvements on suspension and a more tuned engine producing between 205–220 PS (151–162 kW). Front brakes were also updated with 323 mm discs and four-pot Alcon brake calipers.

The final evolution was the Renault Clio Williams Maxi kit-car with wider arches and 17-inch Speedline 2012 rims and improved Proflex suspension. The Sodemo engine was further tuned to 250–265 PS (184–195 kW).

=== Engines ===
Model	Engine	Displacement	Valvetrain	Fuel system	Max. power at rpm	Max. torque at rpm	Years
Petrol
1.2	E5F	1171 cc	SOHC 8v	Carburettor	60 PS (44 kW; 59 hp) at 6000 rpm	85 N⋅m (63 lb⋅ft) at 3500 rpm	1990–1993
1.2	E7F	1171 cc	SOHC 8v	Single-point fuel injection	54 PS (40 kW; 53 hp) at 6000 rpm	83 N⋅m (61 lb⋅ft) at 3500 rpm	1990–1997
1.2	C3G	1239 cc	SOHC 8v	Single-point fuel injection	54 PS (40 kW; 53 hp) at 6000 rpm	83 N⋅m (61 lb⋅ft) at 3500 rpm	1995–1996
1.2	D7F	1149 cc	SOHC 8v	Multi-point fuel injection	54 PS (40 kW; 53 hp) at 5250 rpm	93 N⋅m (69 lb⋅ft) at 2500 rpm	1996–1998
1.2	D7F	1149 cc	SOHC 8v	Multi-point fuel injection	58 PS (43 kW; 57 hp) at 5250 rpm	93 N⋅m (69 lb⋅ft) at 2400 rpm	1997–1998
1.4	E7J	1390 cc	SOHC 8v	Single-point fuel injection	75 PS (55 kW; 74 hp) at 5750 rpm	107 N⋅m (79 lb⋅ft) at 3500 rpm	1990–1998
1.4	E7J	1390 cc	SOHC 8v	Single-point fuel injection	79 PS (58 kW; 78 hp) at 5750 rpm	107 N⋅m (79 lb⋅ft) at 3500 rpm	1996–1998
1.7	F2N	1721 cc	SOHC 8v	Single-point fuel injection	90 PS (66 kW; 89 hp) at 5750 rpm		1990–1991
1.8	F3P	1794 cc	SOHC 8v	Single-point fuel injection	88 PS (65 kW; 87 hp) at 5750 rpm	142 N⋅m (105 lb⋅ft) at 2750 rpm	1990–1996
1.8	F3P	1783 cc	SOHC 8v	Single-point fuel injection	90 PS (66 kW; 89 hp) at 5750 rpm	144 N⋅m (106 lb⋅ft) at 2750 rpm	1996–1998
1.8 RSi	F3P	1794 cc	SOHC 8v	Multi-point fuel injection	110 PS (81 kW; 108 hp) at 5500 rpm	155 N⋅m (114 lb⋅ft) at 4250 rpm	1993–1995
1.8 RSi	F3P	1783 cc	SOHC 8v	Multi-point fuel injection	107 PS (79 kW; 106 hp) at 5500 rpm	150 N⋅m (111 lb⋅ft) at 2750 rpm	1995–1998
16S / 16V	F7P	1764 cc	DOHC 16v	Multi-point fuel injection	137 PS (101 kW; 135 hp) at 6500 rpm	158 N⋅m (117 lb⋅ft) at 4250 rpm	1991–1995
2.0 Clio Williams	F7R	1998 cc	DOHC 16v	Multi-point fuel injection	150 PS (110 kW; 148 hp) at 6100 rpm	175 N⋅m (129 lb⋅ft) at 4500 rpm	1994–1998
Diesel
1.9 d	F8Q	1870 cc	SOHC 8v	Indirect injection	64 PS (47 kW; 63 hp) at 4500 rpm	118 N⋅m (87 lb⋅ft) at 2250 rpm	1991–1998

=== Safety ===
Euro NCAP test results* Renault Clio 1.2RL (RHD) (1997)
Test	Score	Rating
Adult occupant:	N/A	2 /5 stars
Pedestrian:	N/A	1 /4 stars

== Second generation (X65; 1998) ==
Clio II
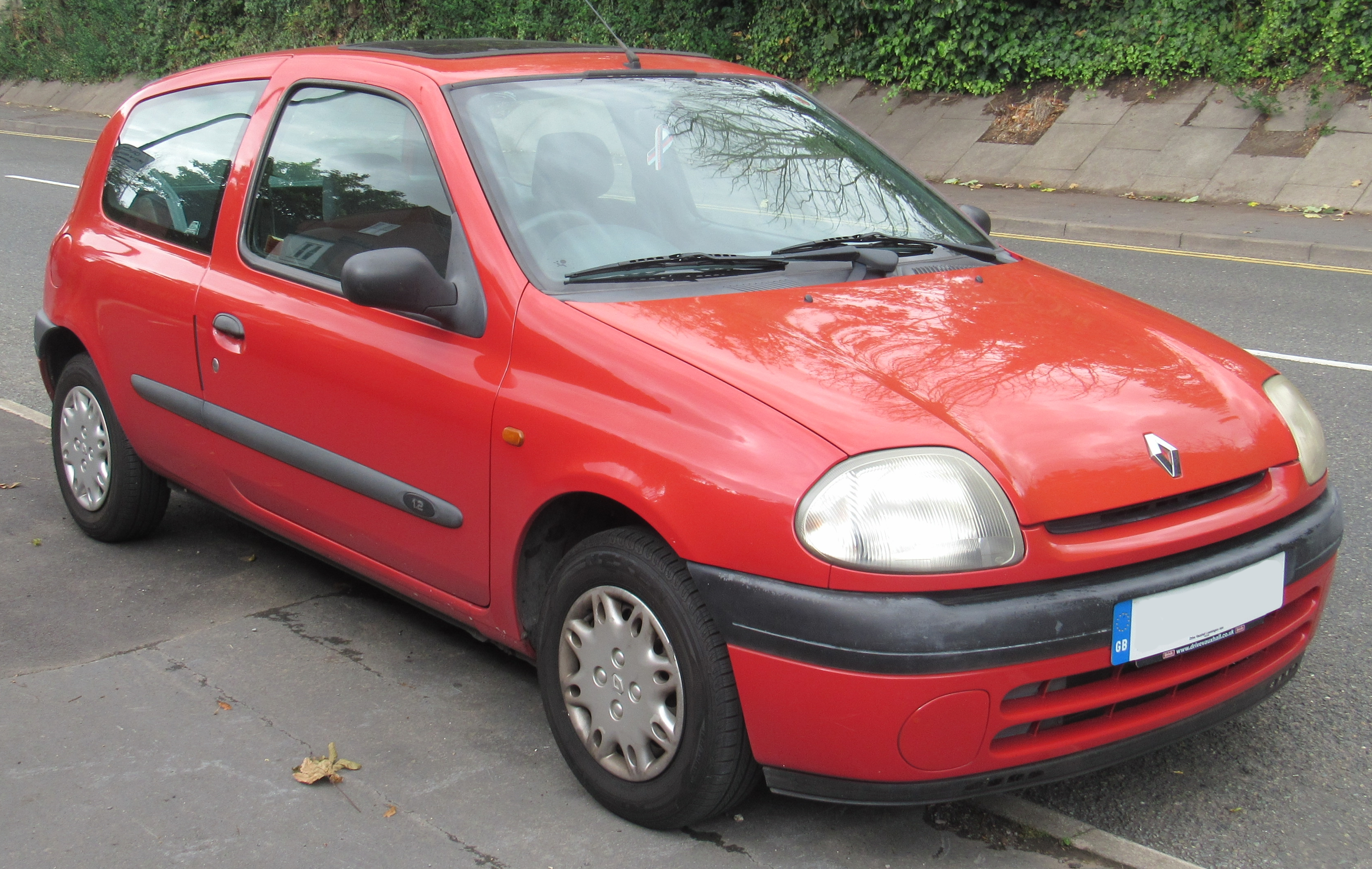

Overview
- Model code: X65
- Also called: Renault Clio Campus; Renault Lutecia (Japan); Renault Mío (Argentina); Renault Symbol (Brazil); Renault Taxi Express (Colombia); Nissan Platina (Mexico)
- Production: 1998–2012 (France); 1998–2012 (Spain); 2000–2016 (Argentina); 2001–2017 (Colombia); 2000–2016 (Mexico); 1998–2015 (Slovenia)
- Assembly: France: Flins (Flins Renault Factory, Clio HB), Dieppe (Alpine, Clio V6 Phase 2); Spain: Valladolid (Renault Spain, Clio II RS); Argentina: Córdoba (Renault Argentina); Brazil: Curitiba, Parana (Renault Brazil); Colombia: Envigado (SOFASA); Mexico: Aguascalientes; Slovenia: Novo Mesto (Revoz, Clio Campus); Turkey: Nilüfer, Bursa Province (Oyak-Renault, Clio Symbol); Sweden: Uddevalla (TWR, Clio V6 Phase 1)
- Designer: Patrick Le Quément (1993)

Body and chassis
- Body style: 3/5-door hatchback 4-door sedan
- Platform: Renault A Platform (X65)
- Related: Dacia Logan

Powertrain
- Engine: Petrol: 999 cc D7D/D4D I4; 1149 cc D7F/D4F I4; 1390 cc K7J/K4J I4; 1598 cc K7M/K4M I4; 1998 cc Renault Sport F4R I4; 2946 cc PSA L7X V6; Diesel: 1461 cc K9K turbo Common rail I4; 1870 cc F8Q I4; 1870 cc F9Q turbo I4
- Transmission: 5/6-speed manual 4-speed automatic 5-speed QuickShift automated manual

Dimensions
- Wheelbase: 2,472 mm (97.3 in)
- Length: 3,773 mm (148.5 in) (1998–01); 4,150 mm (163.4 in) (1998–01 sedan); 3,811 mm (150.0 in) (2001–12); 4,171 mm (164.2 in) (2001–08 sedan)
- Width: 1,639 mm (64.5 in)
- Height: 1,417 mm (55.8 in) (hatchback); 1,437 mm (56.6 in) (sedan)
- Curb weight: 990 kg (2,183 lb)

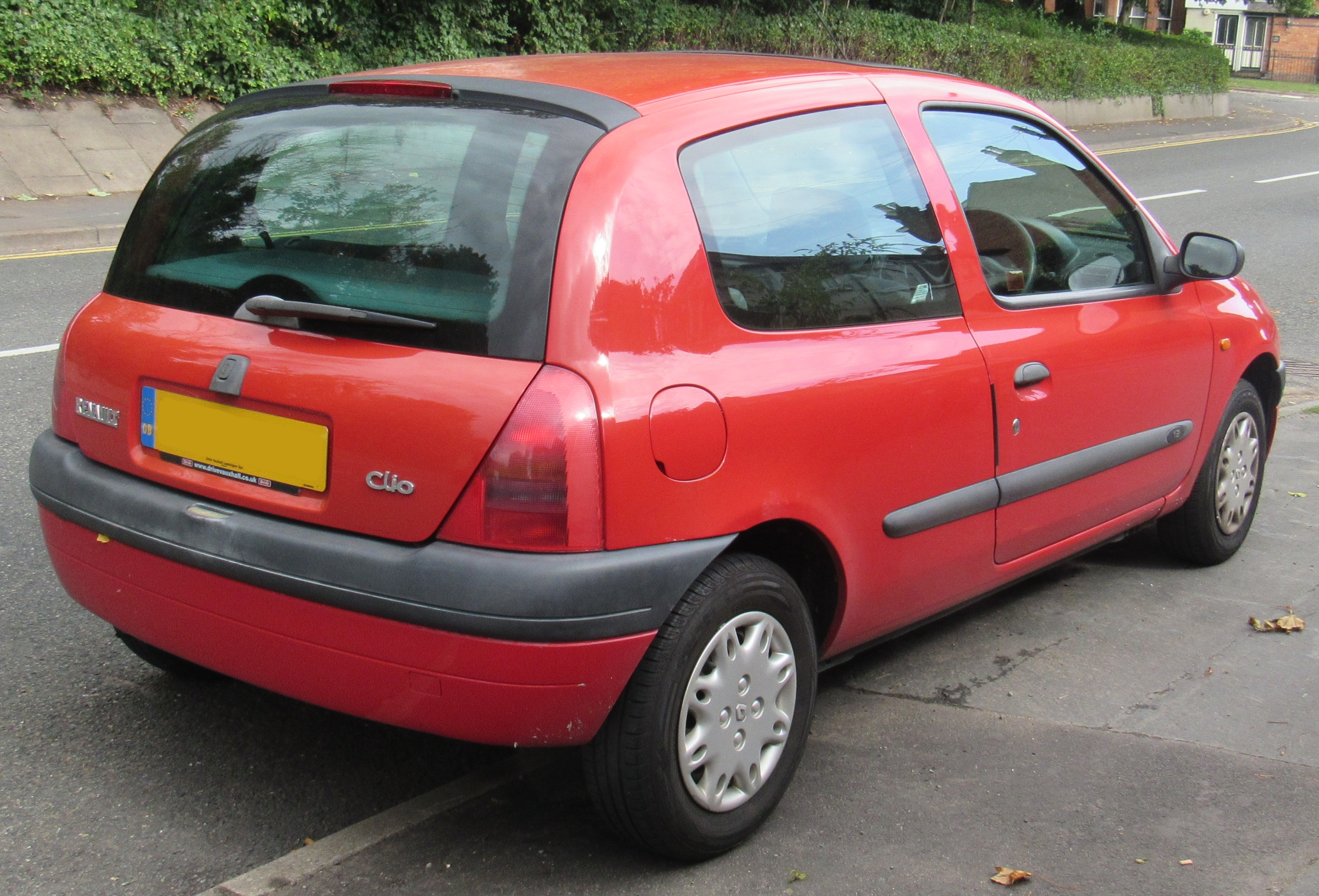
Renault Clio II (pre-facelift)

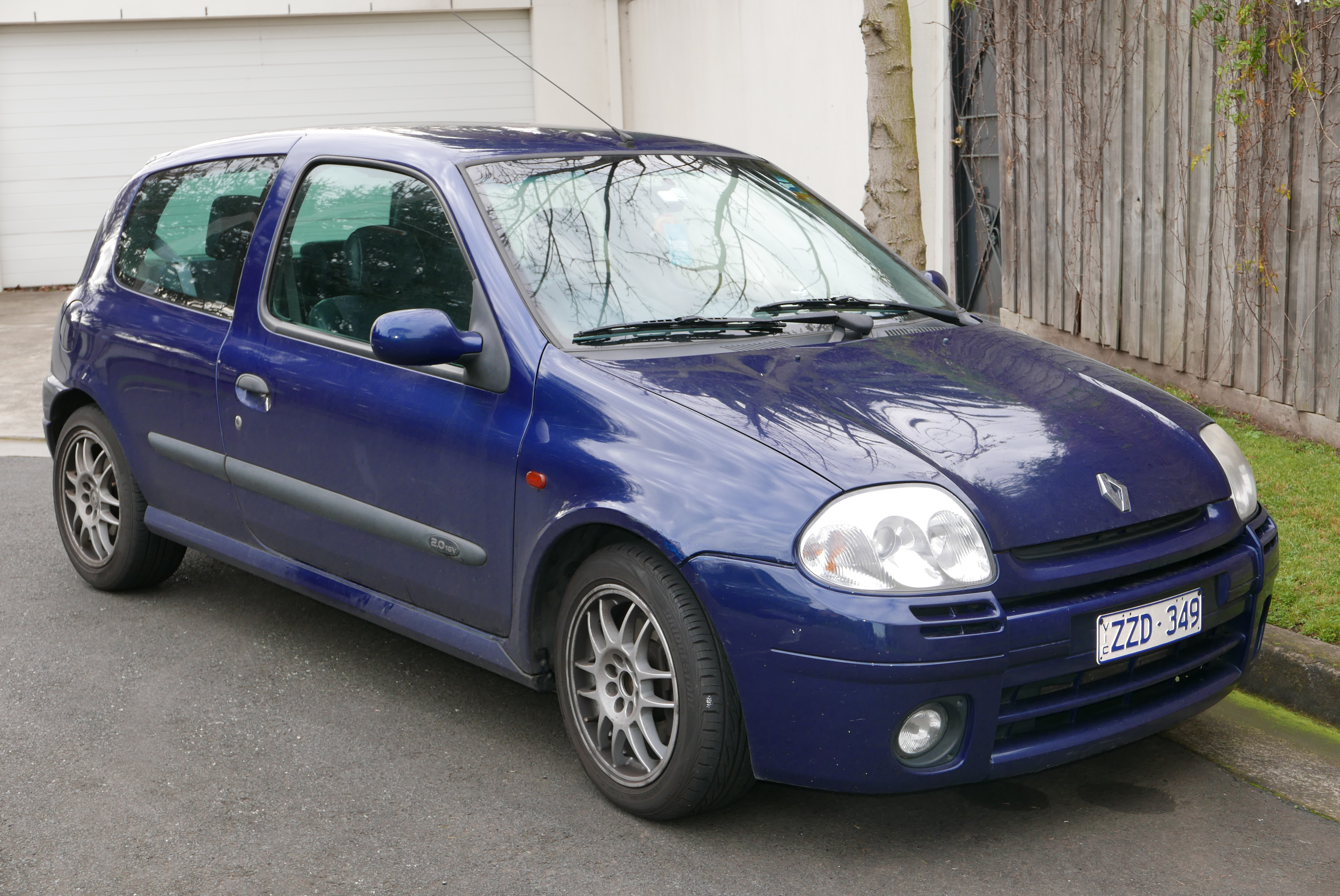

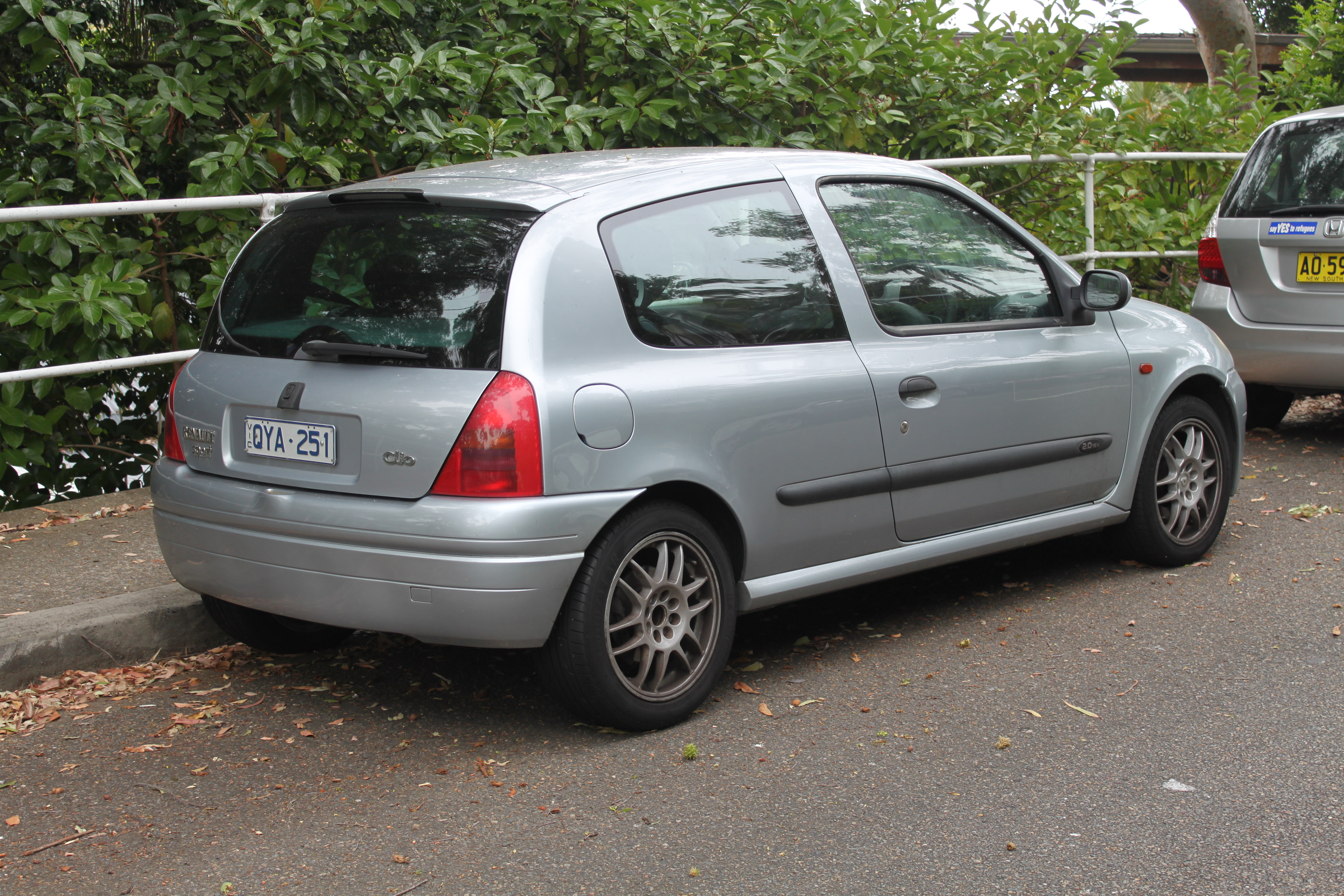
Renault Clio Sport (pre-facelift)

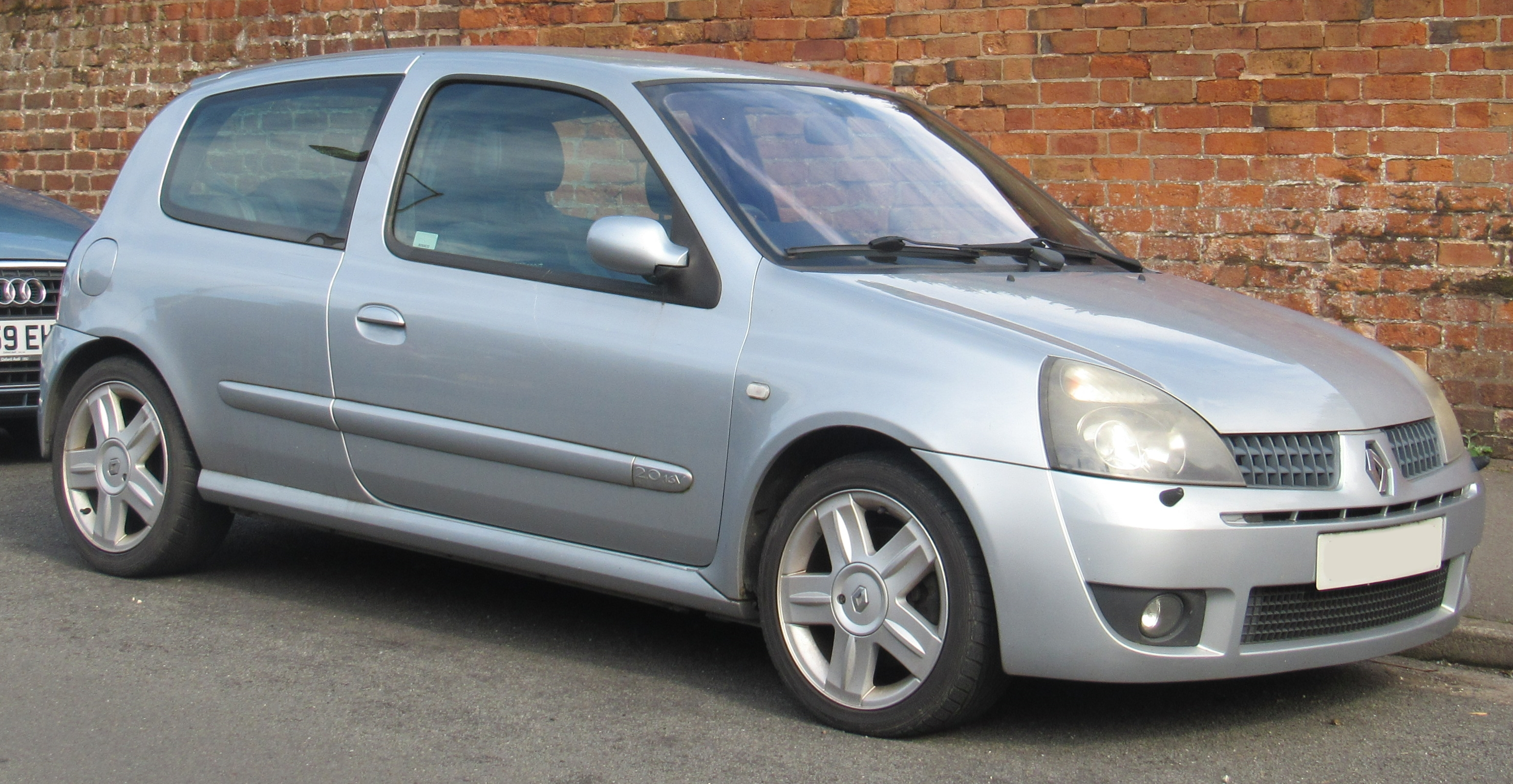

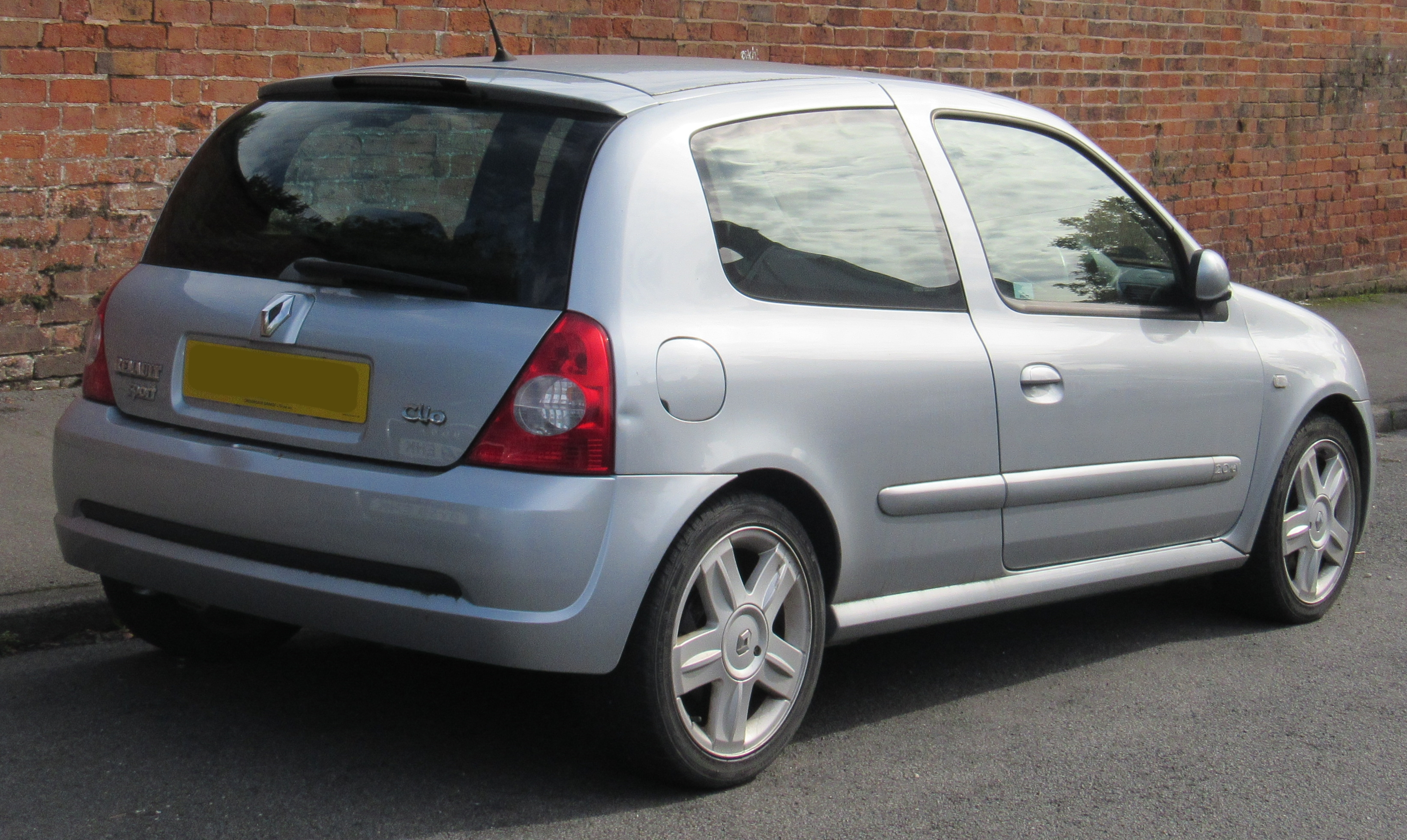
Renault Clio Sport (facelift)

=== Design, development and introduction ===
Development of the second generation of Clio, (designated X65) commenced in 1991, just one year after the May 1990 launch of the first generation Clio. The initial development stage was led by Jean Terramorsi but switched head development as time and development stages went on. Pierre Beuzit became project manager of the program in 1992, and then in December 1993 a final design developed under the leadership of Patrick Le Quément was subsequently approved for pre production.

In the first quarter of 1994 Renault rented a 12,000 square metres (130,000 sq ft) building in Saint-Quentin-en-Yvelines, west of Paris, employing more than 600 people from both Renault itself and all of its suppliers. Renault's Guyancourt technical centre became the main hub for development of the platform at this time, becoming responsible for the chassis, suspension and drivetrain. New concepts such as making panels out of unusual materials to save in weight and repair costs were proposed, for example, the front wings were made of plastic (following criticisms of corrosion/rusting on the Clio 1 and based on technology developed for the Renault Espace) and the bonnet was made out of aluminum in some production versions for weight reduction to combat fuel costs. Forty separate teams were created, each responsible for a section of the car.

In February 1997, management moved its predicted market launch by nearly a month from the 15th March 1998 to the 11th April 1998. Around the same time as this pushback, prototyping had almost been completed and pre-production units began to be constructed at Flins for final tweaks and improvements.

The second generation of the Clio was officially launched on April 11, 1998, with Renault's marketing campaign emphasizing its curvaceous design, new safety features, and superior driving experience to its predecessor.

=== Trim levels ===
==== Trim levels at launch ====
At launch, 4 different engine sizes and configurations were available. A 1.2L 8V (60 hp) engine which was typically available in the entry-level trims, a 1.4L 8V (75 hp) engine, and a 1.6L 8V (90 hp) engine for those who wanted a sportier driving experience. There were 3 different trim levels, the RN, RT an RXE. They represented the base spec, mid range spec and high spec models.

The RN was the entry-level trim with essential features only, like manual windows and a simple radio.

The RT/E offered more comfort features, like power windows, central locking, and higher quality seats and door cards.

The RXE was the highest spec trim at launch, and came with features such as air conditioning, alloy wheels and 60W stereo systems.

==== Post launch trim levels ====
In 1999, Renault launched the Clio Renault Sport 172 (also known as Clio R.S. for short), with 172 hp (127 kW) produced by a 2.0L 16-valve engine, it could reach a top speed of 220 km/h (137 mph). This was named the Clio Renault Sport 172 in the UK – 172 coming from the DIN method metric horsepower measurement. The standard Clio RTE powered with by the 1.2 54 hp (40 kW) engine could reach 160 km/h (99 mph). The top-of-the-range Clio, however, was the 2001 mid-engine, rear-wheel drive Clio V6 Renault Sport, originally engineered by Tom Walkinshaw Racing for a one-make racing series, which placed a 230 hp (169 kW) 3.0L V6 engine, sourced from the Renault Laguna, behind the front seats, with a top speed of 235 km/h (146 mph). Production was at the TWR factory in Sweden. Clio V6 production over three years was approximately 1513 vehicles with 256 sold in the UK.

Renault at this time also launched two new engine configurations, A version equipped with a new 1.6L 16-valve engine, along with a refined 1.9L 8-valve turbo-diesel. They used these engines to push their new "warm hatch" variants - the Si (Sports injection) and RSI (RenaultSport injection) trims.

==== The Clio Sport collection ====
Whilst the 172 and V6 became the flagship performance models under RenaultSport, the Si and RSI were much lesser-known variants aimed at offering sporty styling and enhanced features at a more accessible price point. Both models today are considered rare, with the Si spec being exceptionally rare. Unlike the RSI, which benefitted from the brand new 1.6 16V engine, the Si occupied an extremely unusual position in the lineup - It combined the styling an features of a performance model whilst using a diesel powertrain - a choice which was uncommon at the time as diesels were known for economy, not performance. As a result, the Si saw extremely limited production (under 8,000 units globally) which lasted just over 1 year before being pulled off the market entirely. Both trim levels featured body coloured bumpers, white instrument dials and alloy wheels, on top of all other standard and options that the highest trim Clio's came with. The Clio Si, whilst being less powerful with the new 1.9L dTi diesel engine, also carried all of the sporty design clues as the RSI did but with the addition of bucket seats in the front, and an electric back tilt sunroof.

Both of these models came with ABS, alloy wheels, both driver and passenger airbags, 60w RDS radios, rear spoilers and heat reflecting windscreens as standard options.

After this time, all the older petrol engines were upgraded to more powerful and more economical 16-valve versions.

Later on in 2000, a few minor changes were made to the Clio range, which included revised specification levels, a new instrument cluster, and a passenger airbag fitted as standard for all models.

In Japan, Renault was formerly licensed by Yanase Co., Ltd., but in 1999, Renault purchased a stake in Japanese automaker Nissan after Nissan had faced financial troubles following the collapse of the Japanese asset price bubble in 1991 and subsequent Lost Decade. As a result of Renault's purchase of interest, Yanase canceled its licensing contract with Renault in the spring of 2000, and Nissan took over as the sole licensee, hence sales of the Lutecia II in Japan were transferred from Yanase Store locations to Nissan Red Stage Store locations.

==== The Clio Freeway collection ====
Following the release of the Clio sport collection, the Clio Freeway collection was launched - it was the entry level collection of the Clio 2 in 2000, and It consisted of the base model Clio Liberte, Clio Grande, and the Clio MTV. This collection was aimed at the much more casual driver, who valued a car to get them from point A to B and nothing more.

The Clio Liberte featured a driver and passenger airbag as standard, with no other options available. The Clio Grande came with power steering, central locking, a sunroof and 60w RDS radio as standard on top of all Liberte features. The flagship of the Freeway collection was the Clio MTV, a special edition of the Renault Clio, created in collaboration with MTV, the popular music television network. This limited-edition model was aimed at younger drivers and featured unique styling and entertainment-focused features such as an MTV themed interior, MTV badging, a 64W radio system with 6 speakers as standard, and all other "medium" trim options offered around this time.

==== The Clio Elegance collection ====
The Clio Elegance Collection represented a premium line of trims designed to offer features typically found in more expensive executive cars. There were three models in the collection, the Clio Alize, the Clio Etoile and the Clio Initiale. All three included options like air conditioning, leather upholstery, power steering, electric front windows, and advanced audio systems. The Initiale trim, positioned as the flagship, featured luxury touches such as wood-effect trims and leather steering wheels. This collection was particularly popular for those seeking compact luxury, competing directly with the more youthful Sport Collection and the entry-level Freeway Collection, which focused on performance and affordability, respectively. The Elegance Collection's blend of comfort and refinement contributed to its strong sales and appeal.

=== Electric Clio ===
An electric version of the Clio was developed by Renault for an electric carshare project in Saint-Quentin-en-Yvelines in 1998. Fifty cars were produced, and could be charged by plugging in or by an induction pad located in some of the town's special locations. The electric Clio had a claimed top speed of 60 mph and a range of 35–40 miles. The scheme was branded Praxitèle and membership was charged at £10/month and around £3 for a 30-minute trip.

=== Phase 2 ===
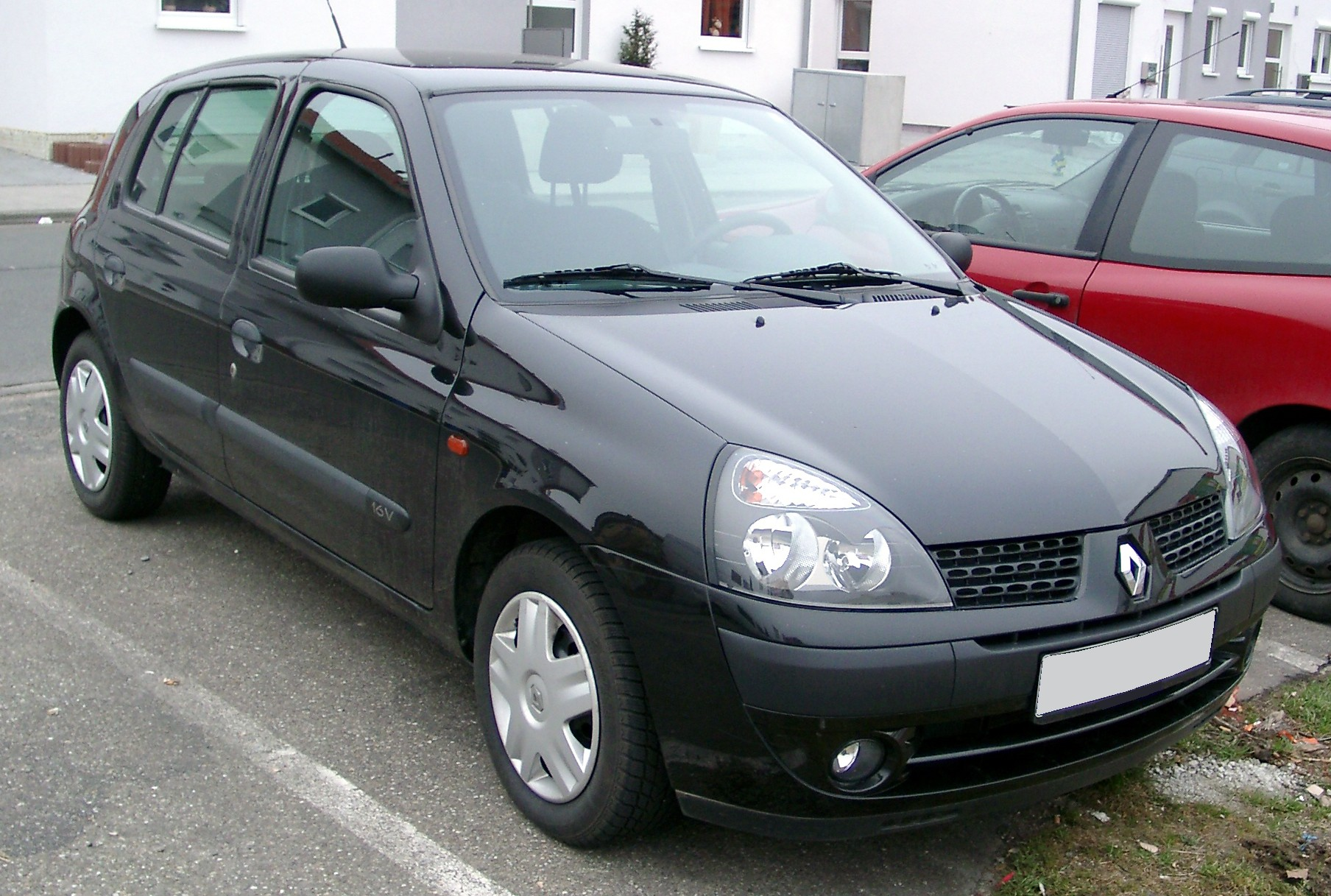
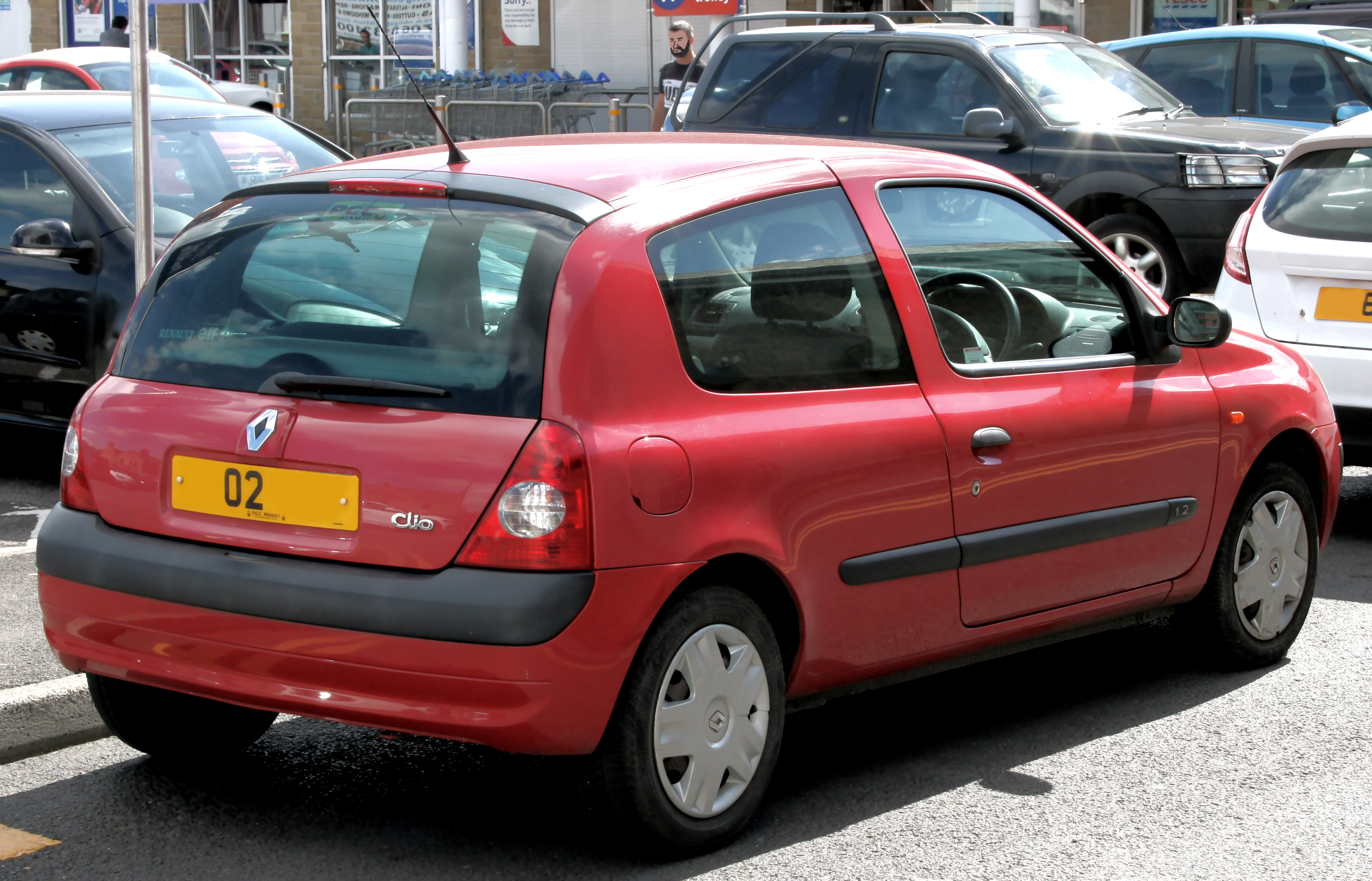
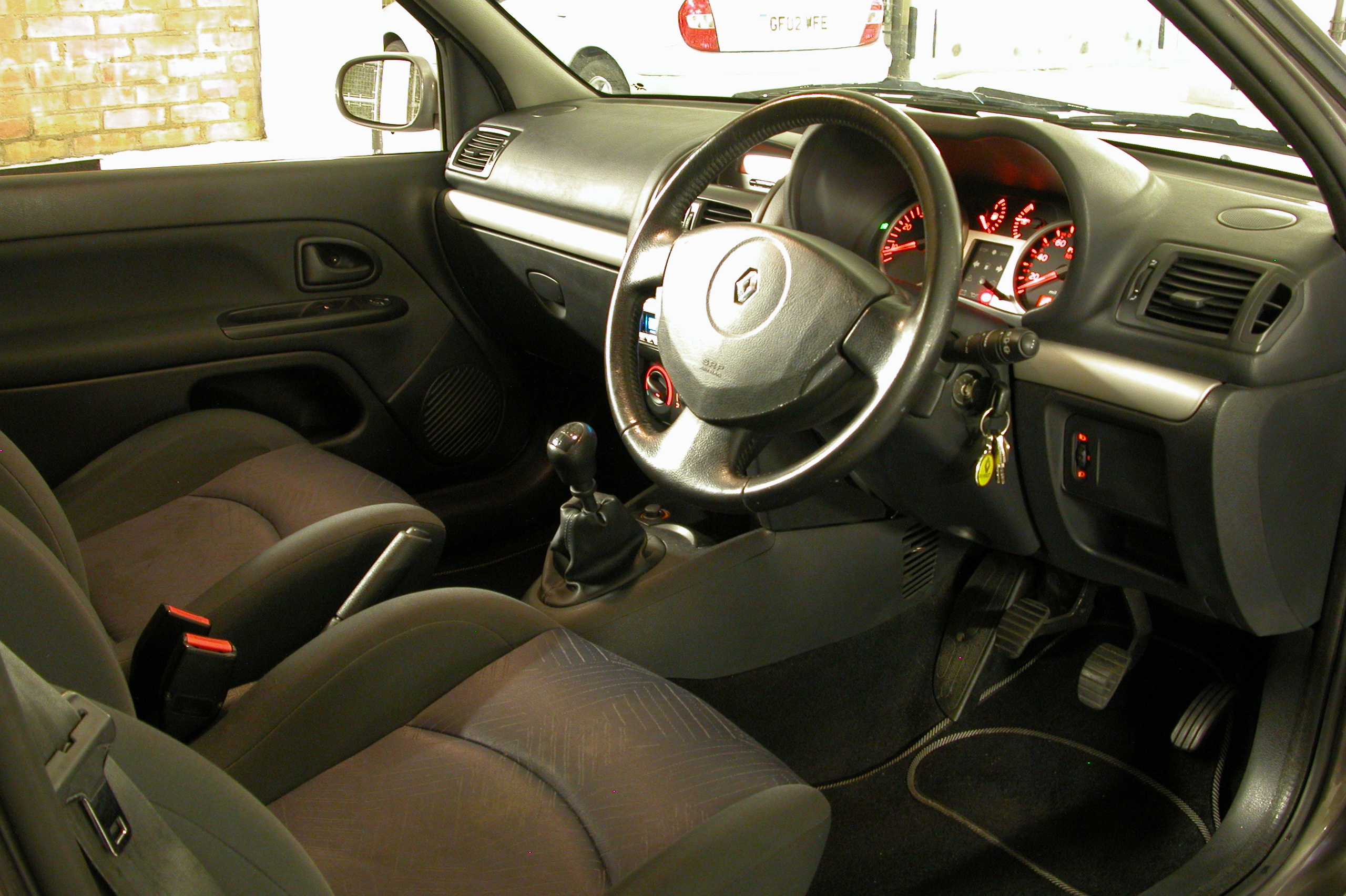
Renault Clio Phase 2 first facelift

A major facelift occurred in June 2001 (Phase 2) which saw the exterior restyled (most visibly the headlights were made more angular), the interior quality improved with a new dashboard and centre console including the availability of digital climate control air-conditioning and satellite navigation on top models and a 1.5 L common rail Diesel engine added.

==== 2003 ====
Major revisions were made to the mid-engined, 3.0-litre V6 model in line with the facelift introduced to the regular models in 2001 including revised frontal styling, new dashboard and higher equipment levels including climate control, cruise control and xenon headlights. The power output of the engine was raised by 25 PS (18 kW) to 255 PS (188 kW), giving it a top speed of 246 km/h (153 mph) and a 0–62 mph (100 km/h) time of 5.8 seconds. Emissions are 285g/km and meet Euro IV standards 2 years before the implementation deadline. The chassis was also significantly revised with a slightly longer wheelbase and revised suspension together with larger 18 inch alloy wheels. For the Phase 2 V6, production was transferred from TWR's Swedish factory to the dedicated Renault Sport Alpine factory at Dieppe in Northern France. Production from 2003 to the end of 2005 was approximately 1309 vehicles of which 354 were sold in the UK.

On ordinary cars, an interior equipment specification change was made from this model year – fitment of a CD player as standard (as opposed to cassette) on Expression and Dynamique. It remained optional on Authentique and its Rush derivative.

=== Phase 3 ===
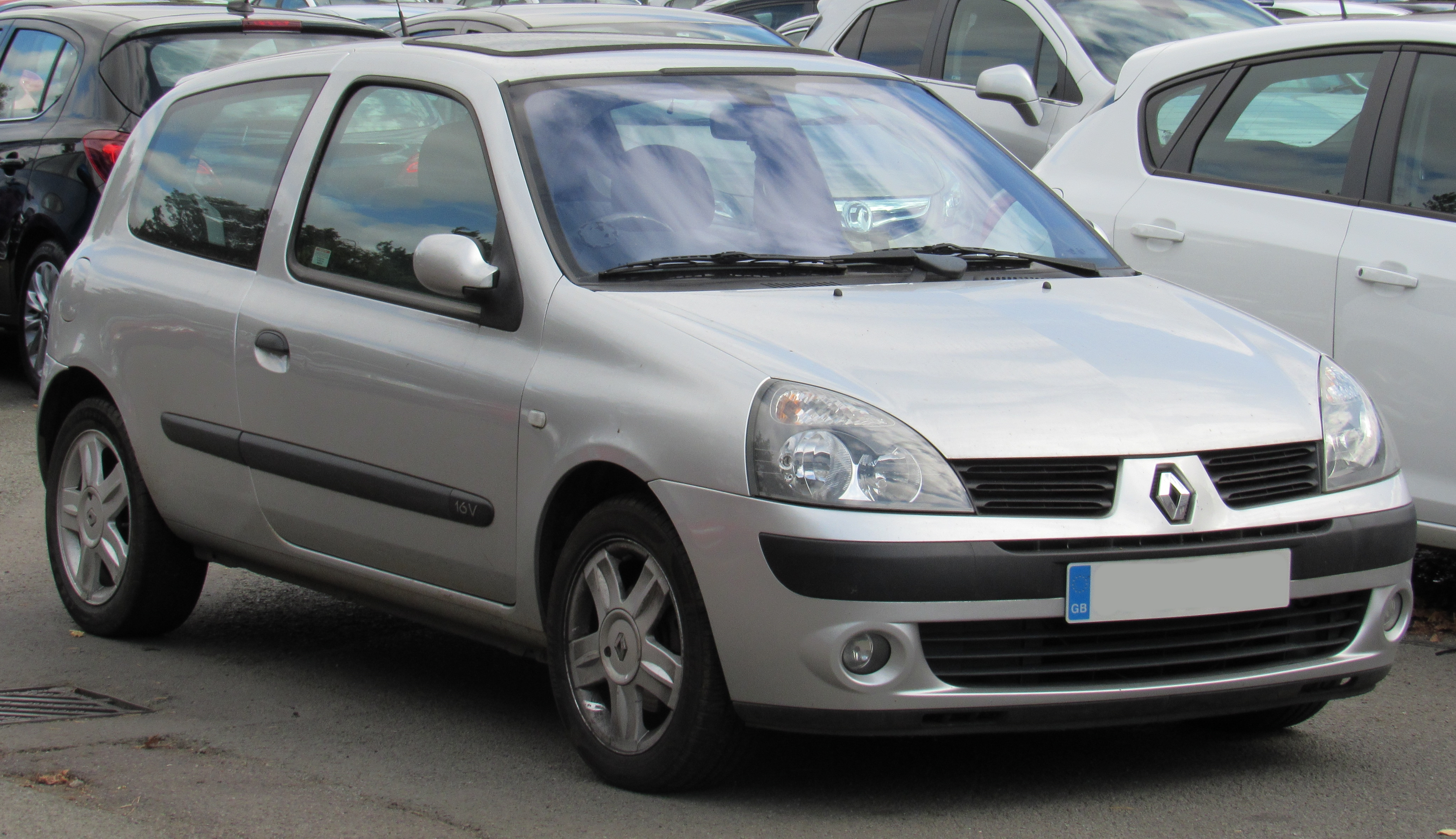
Renault Clio II second facelift

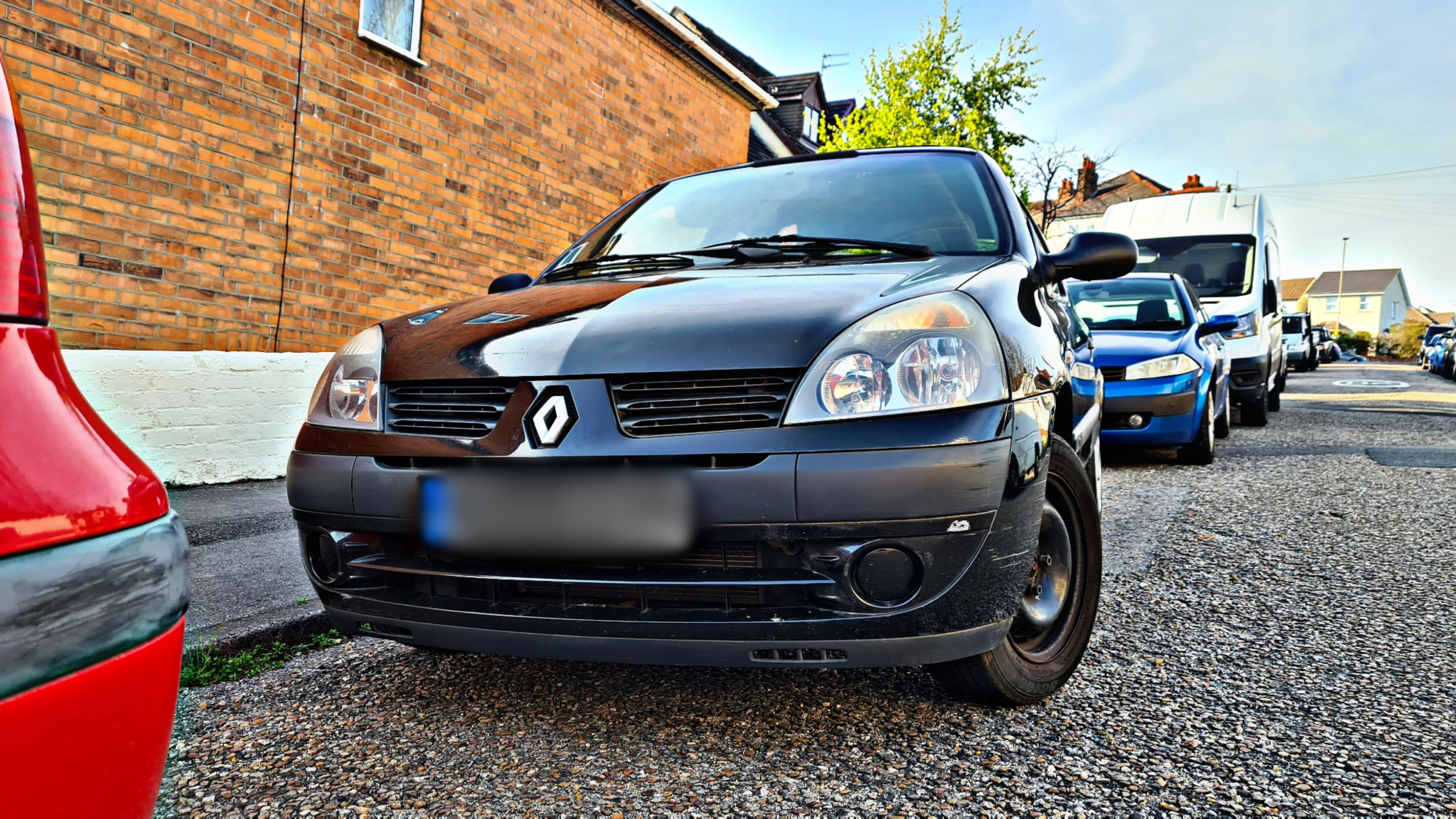
Clio II Expression Phase 3 (Without foglamps)

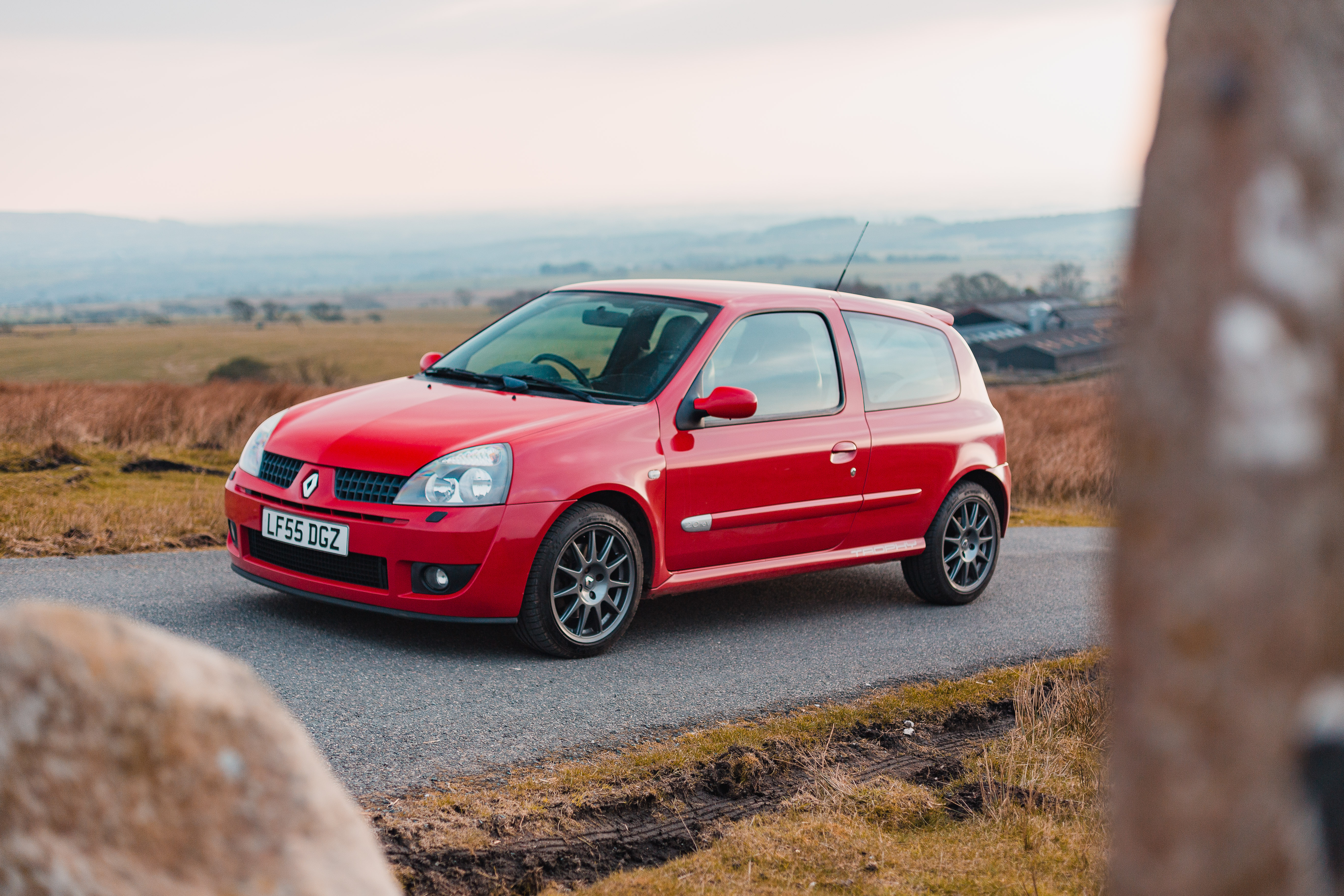
A Renault Sport Clio 182 Trophy

In 2004, Phase 3 followed starting on a 53 Plate, this was just some small changes to bring it up to date. The front bumper was changed giving it a wide lower grille and the foglights were bulged out at the side (cars not equipped with foglights remained using the older ph2 bumper), the upper grille was changed and the headlights (which previously had black background) became grey. The 15-inch alloy wheels were changed and became a 15-inch version of the facelift 172 model on Dynamique and Extreme models. Clear side repeaters were added, as was a colourcoded rear spoiler (again on Dynamique spec cars). In the South American market, the facelifted Clio continued to use the dashboard of the 1998 model and was never updated, except for the Colombian 2008 model that included the same interior of the European version with little changes, and continued having the same exterior as the phase II model.

On the inside the pattern on the seats was changed for a simpler one, and the dials were changed to do away with the fuel and water temperature needles and featured a larger screen that included a digital version of these gauges as well as the mileage and trip computer. Climate control equipped cars were given a vent in the back of the glove box so it could be climate controlled. Under the bonnet a new 100 PS (74 kW) dCi engine was available (the 1.2 16v also received a new engine developed with Nissan). Rear discs were fitted on 1.6 16v models and DCi 100 models equipped with ESP. On this second facelift, the Clio Renault Sport's power was improved to 182 PS (134 kW) (in the UK, the designation R.S. 182 was adopted). For the first time there were two options in chassis stiffness for the R.S. model. the standard Settings (different from the non-sport models), and CUP badge chassis, 20 mm lower, larger stabilizer bars, and stiffer suspension with dark graphite alloy wheels.

At the 2006 Paris International Agricultural Show, Renault exhibited a Hi-Flex Clio II with a 1.6 L 16-valve engine. This vehicle, which addresses the Brazilian market, features Renault-developed flex-fuel technology, with a highly versatile engine that can run on fuel containing a blend of petrol and ethanol in any proportion (0% to 100% of either).

=== Phase 4 / 5 ===
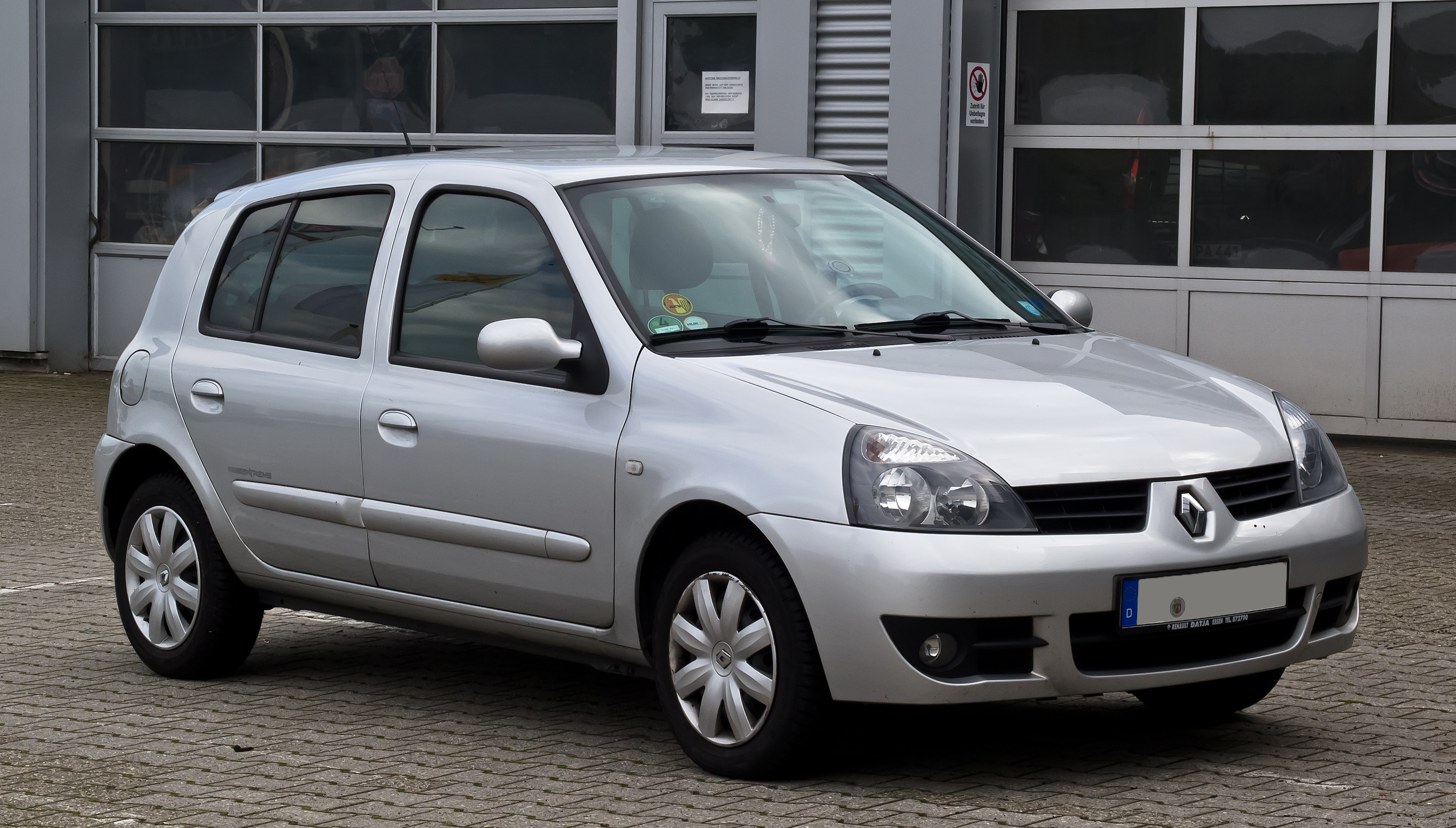
Renault Clio II third facelift (Phase 4)

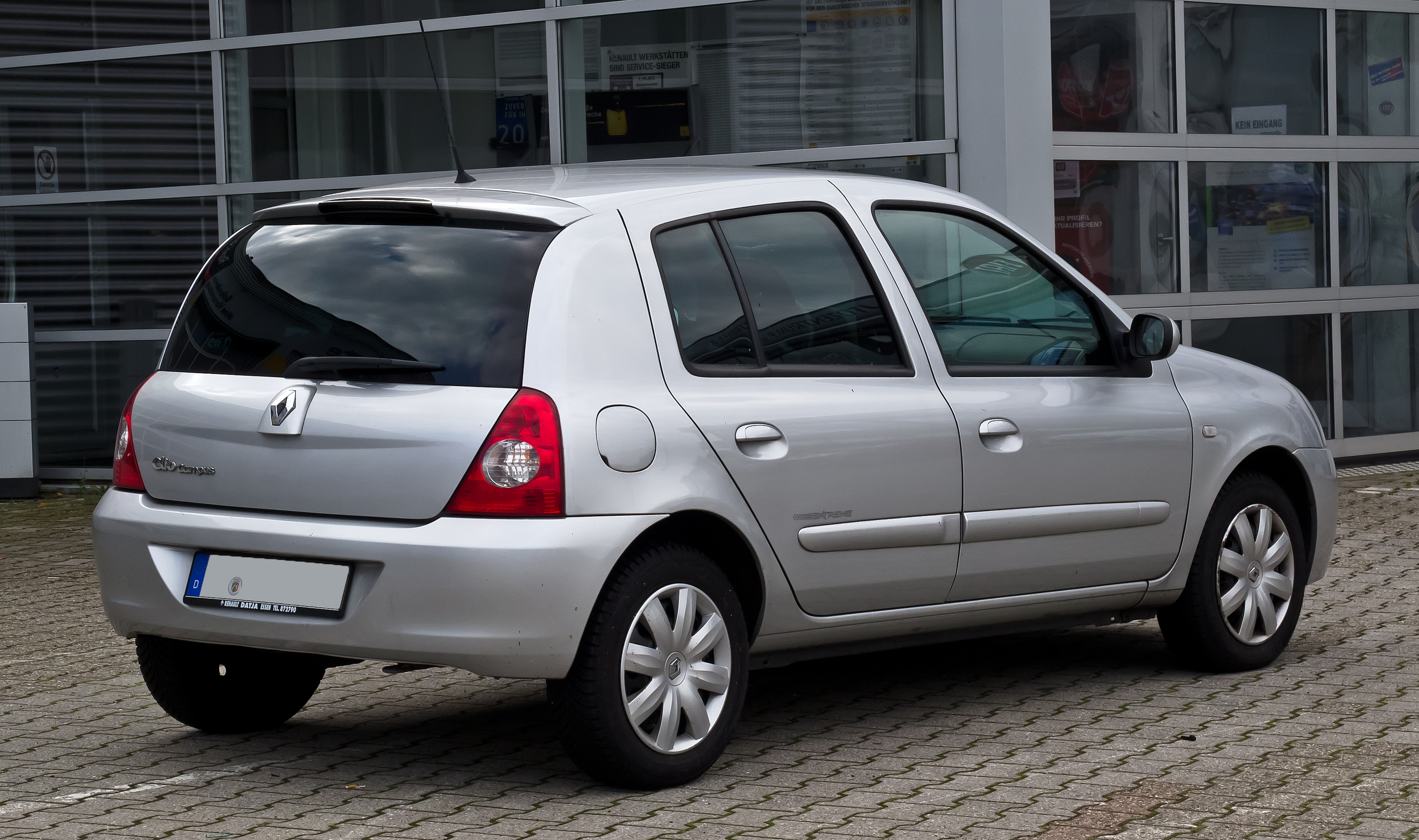
Renault Clio II third facelift (Phase 4)

The Phase 4 Clio II, known as the Clio Campus, was introduced in 2006 and had a restyled rear end, the number plate moving from boot to bumper, and a better specification on all models. This car stopped being sold in the UK in late 2008, and a revised front end was then released in April 2009 (Phase 5).

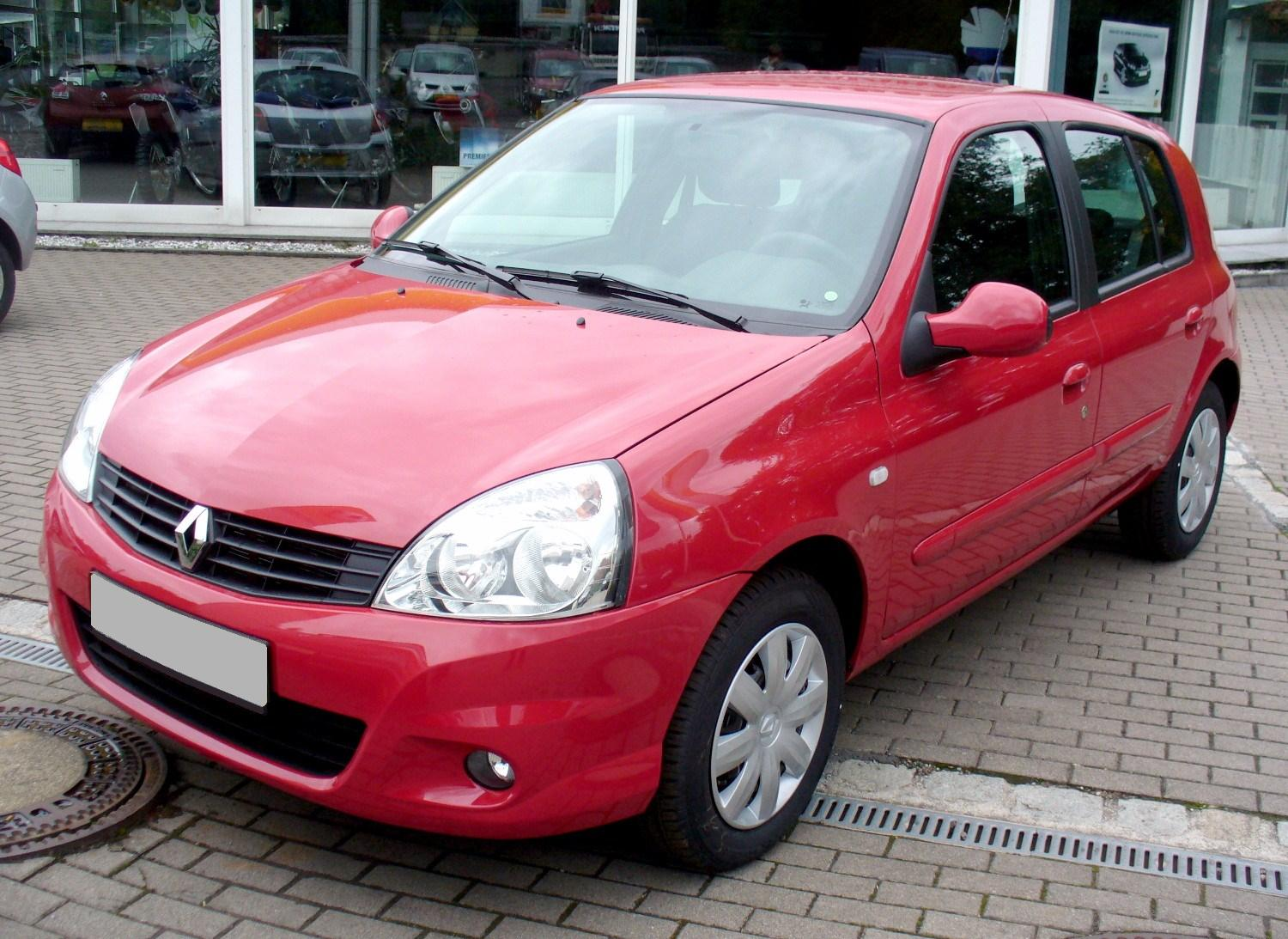
Fourth facelift (Phase 5), marketed as the Clio Campus

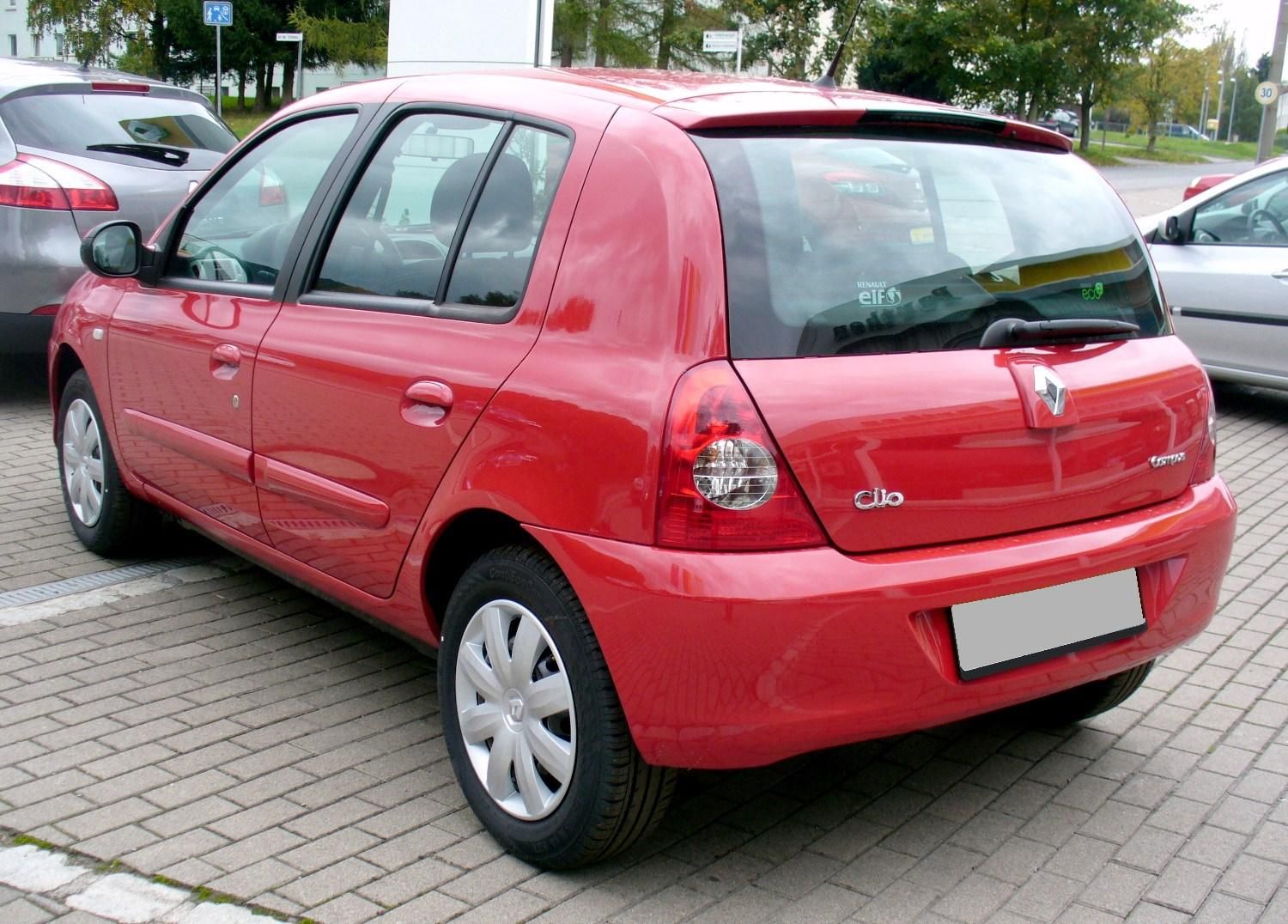
Fourth facelift (Phase 5)

The last units of the Clio II built in Mexico featured the headlights used on the Nissan Platina, thus becoming the third headlight design to be used in the car. This version lasted a month (January 2010) on sale, before both the Clio and Platina being replaced by the Logan and Sandero due to quality issues. The second generation Clio was marketed until 2012 in France as the Clio Campus, or in Slovenia as the Clio Storia. It is still marketed in Colombia also as Clio Campus since 2012, with the same interior as the pre-facelifted model and a very basic equipment, without airbags or foglights.

=== Phase 6 ===
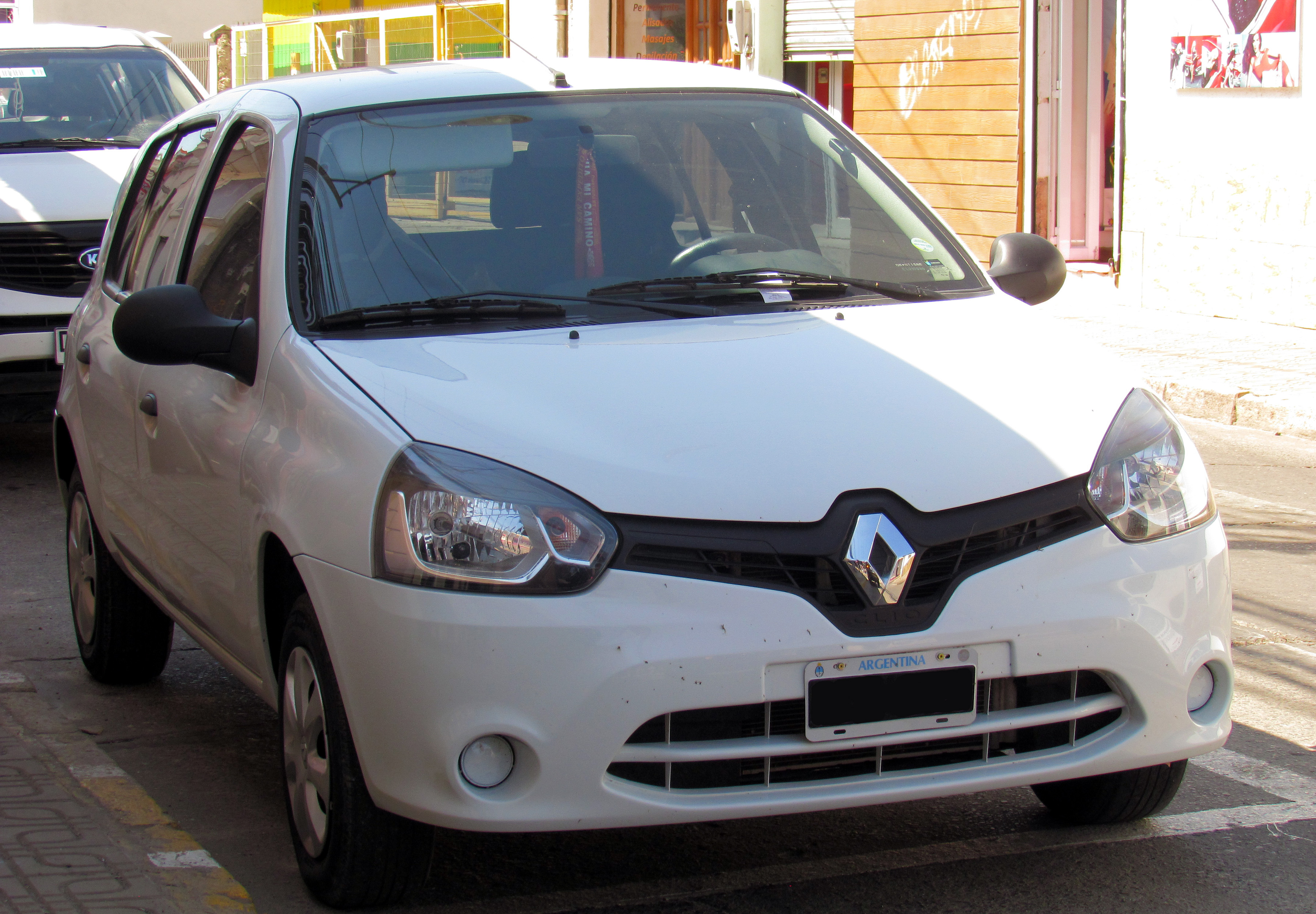
Renault Clio Mío (Argentina)

In October 2012, a new version of the Clio II, called Clio Mío, was introduced at the São Paulo Motor Show, featuring the brand's new design theme. Intended to be the lowest priced Renault model available in Latin America, it was manufactured in Córdoba, Argentina, and featured additional styling and equipment updates. It kept the dashboard of the pre-facelift version, but with new gauges and optional colour matching inserts.

As of 2015, it contained about 40% Argentine parts.

The Phase 6 Clio II was also offered in Maghreb, where it kept the name Clio Campus. It was finally retired from production in October 2016.

=== Sedan ===
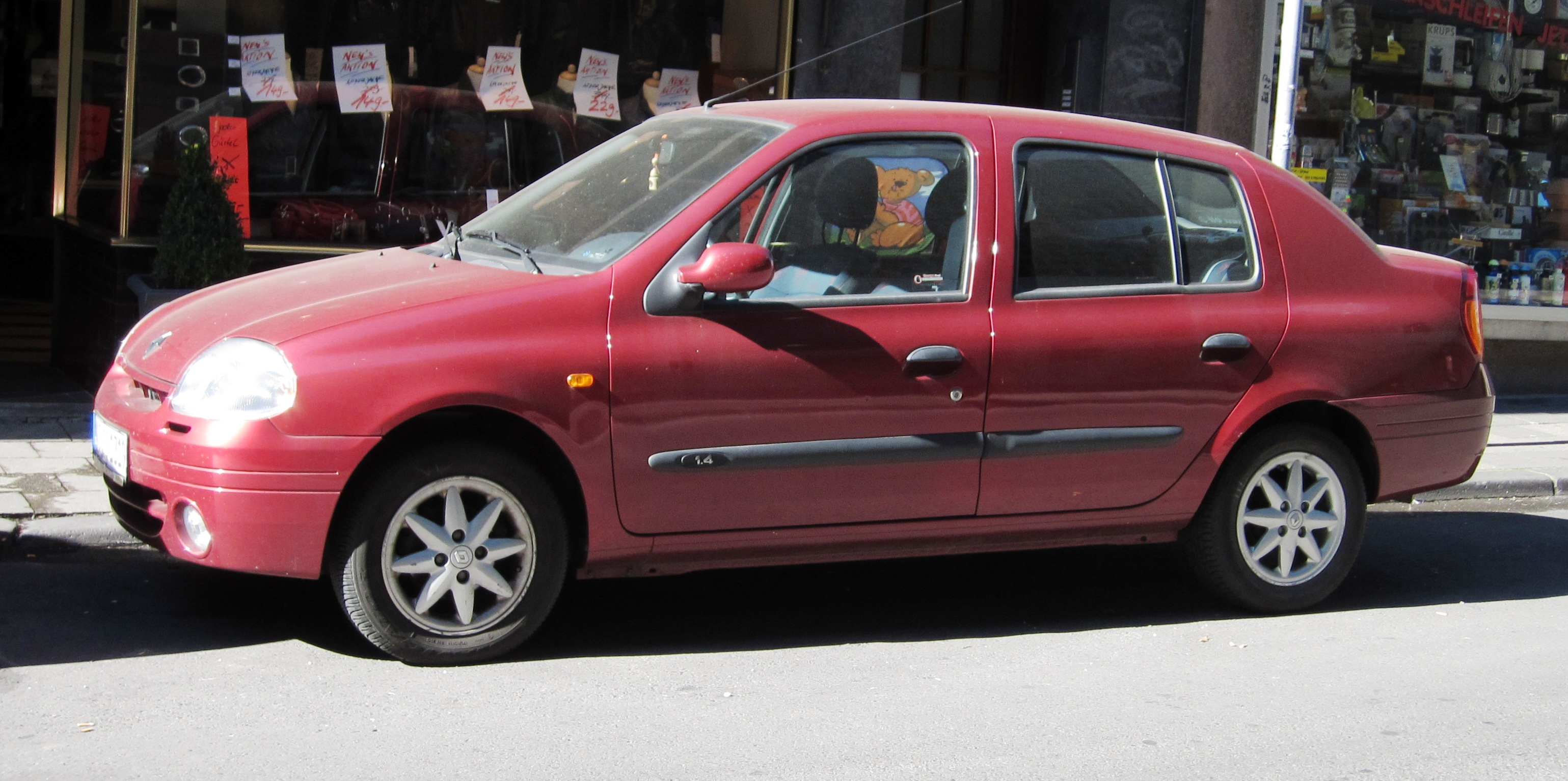
1999 Renault Clio Symbol

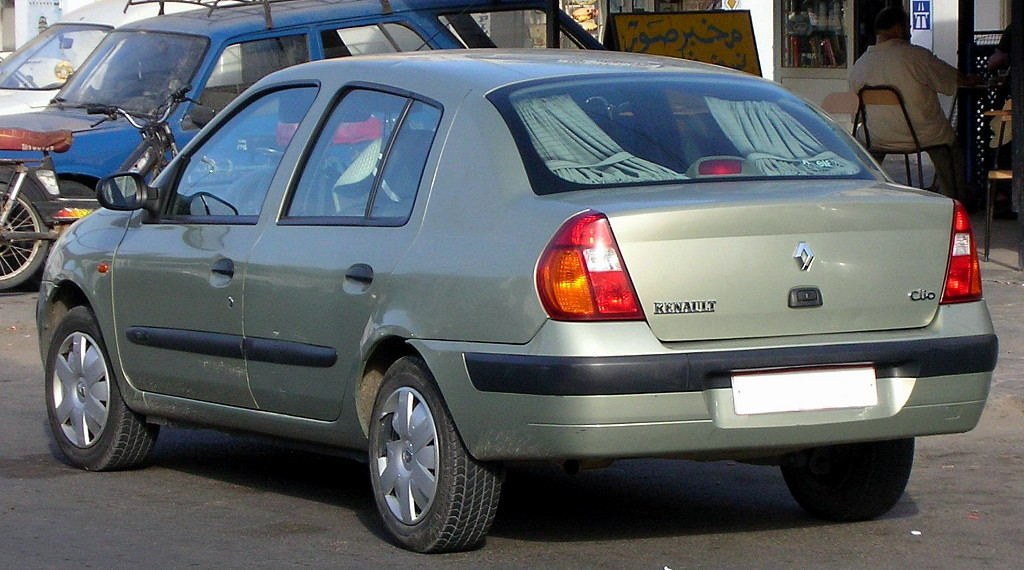
2002 Renault Clio Symbol

In 1999, Renault launched the saloon version of the Clio II, named Clio Symbol in Turkey and Eastern Europe, Thalia in Central Europe, Clio Classic in Asia and North Africa, Clio Sedan in Brazil and Paraguay, or Symbol in the rest of South America (except Argentina where it was called Clio). The car was intended for sale in developing countries, where saloons were traditionally preferred over hatchbacks, most notably in Eastern Europe, where the Thalia was cheaper than the Clio, but was still about 30% more expensive than the Dacia Logan, also sold by Renault as a low cost model. In some Latin American markets the sedan was offered as the Nissan Platina (manufactured in Aguascalientes, Mexico), with slight changes in the front of the car to make it resemble the Nissan Altima. The sedan version of the Clio was facelifted in 2002, with new exterior similar to the facelifted Clio, better equipment and safety levels.

In the fall of 2006, an improved Clio sedan has been offered, renamed in Eastern Europe as Renault Symbol. This model featured the interior of the facelifted Clio II with very minor parts commonality with Megane II, as well as new standard and optional equipment, such as automatic air conditioning and a CD player. The model earned moderate reception in the domestic market.

Renault introduced the second generation of the Symbol model at the 2008 Moscow Motor Show. This new model featured chrome-trimmed front grille and rear fascia, while powered by similar engines as the Dacia Logan range. It was designed for the Eastern and Central Europe, Russia, Turkey and North Africa, and it was also manufactured in Argentina for South America.

=== Watchdog controversy ===
In April 2006, the BBC's consumer affairs programme Watchdog aired details of over 1,000 incidents involving Clio IIs in which the bonnet flew open without warning while still being driven, usually at high speeds, and sometimes writing the cars off. The problem was found to be caused by the catch not being cleaned and lubricated during servicing causing it to stick in the open position. Renault investigated the issue with the aid of the Vehicle and Operator Services Agency (VOSA) and a "task force" of Renault departments to test the design but found no problem with the bonnet catch and so would not issue a recall. Renault instead wrote to owners of the model and offered to "remedy for free any catches where there has been poor maintenance".

Watchdog has since claimed other experts have contacted them with accusations that Renault was expecting people to maintain a flawed part that would corrode over time and could cost lives. David Burrowes, MP, Chair of the Government's Road Safety Group, later tabled a motion in the House of Commons urging further action. Renault was accused by its Press Relations Manager Graeme Holt, who quit in protest, of downplaying the serious "fault" and putting customers' lives in danger.

=== Engines ===
Model	Code	Valvetrain	Displacement	Max. power	Max. torque	Availability
Petrol
1.0	D7D	SOHC 8v	999 cc	59 PS (43 kW; 58 hp) at 5500 rpm	81 N⋅m (60 lb⋅ft) at 4,250 rpm	Brazil, 2000–2007
1.0	D4D	SOHC 16v	999 cc	76 PS (56 kW; 75 hp) at 6000 rpm	95 N⋅m (70 lb⋅ft) at 4250 rpm	Brazil, 2003–2005
1.0 (Petrol/Ethanol)	D4D	SOHC 16v	999 cc	77 PS (57 kW; 76 hp) at 6000 rpm	100 N⋅m (74 lb⋅ft) at 4,250 rpm	Brazil, 2006–2012
1.0 (Petrol/Ethanol)	D4D	SOHC 16v	999 cc	80 PS (59 kW; 79 hp) at 5,750 rpm	103 N⋅m (76 lb⋅ft) at 4,250 rpm	Brazil, 2013–2016
1.2	D7F	SOHC 8v	1149 cc	60 PS (44 kW; 59 hp) at 5,250 rpm	93 N⋅m (69 lb⋅ft) at 2,500 rpm	1998–2012
1.2	D4F 712	SOHC 16v	1149 cc	75 PS (55 kW; 74 hp) at 5,500 rpm	105 N⋅m (77 lb⋅ft) at 3,500 rpm	2001–2004
1.2	D4F 722	SOHC 16v	1149 cc	75 PS (55 kW; 74 hp) at 5,500 rpm	107 N⋅m (79 lb⋅ft) at 4,250 rpm	2004–2012
1.4	E7J	SOHC 8v	1390 cc	75 PS (55 kW; 74 hp) at 5,500 rpm	114 N⋅m (84 lb⋅ft) at 4,250 rpm	1991–2001
1.4	K7J	SOHC 8v	1390 cc	75 PS (55 kW; 74 hp) at 5,500 rpm	114 N⋅m (84 lb⋅ft) at 4,250 rpm	1998–2001
1.4	K4J	DOHC 16v	1390 cc	98 PS (72 kW; 97 hp) at 6,000 rpm	127 N⋅m (94 lb⋅ft) at 3,750 rpm	1999–2000
1.4	K4J 710	DOHC 16v	1390 cc	100 PS (74 kW; 99 hp) at 6,000 rpm	127 N⋅m (94 lb⋅ft) at 3,750 rpm	2000–2005
1.6	K7M 744	SOHC 8v	1598 cc	90 PS (66 kW; 89 hp) at 5,250 rpm	131 N⋅m (97 lb⋅ft) at 2,500 rpm	1998–2000
1.6	K4M	DOHC 16v	1598 cc	110 PS (81 kW; 108 hp) at 5,750 rpm	148 N⋅m (109 lb⋅ft) at 3,750 rpm	1999–2005
1.6 (Petrol/Ethanol)	K4M	DOHC 16v	1598 cc	115 PS (85 kW; 113 hp) at 5,750 rpm	157 N⋅m (116 lb⋅ft) at 3,750 rpm	Brazil, 2005–2009
2.0 R.S.	F4R 736	DOHC 16v	1998 cc	172 PS (127 kW; 170 hp) at 6,250 rpm	200 N⋅m (148 lb⋅ft) at 5,400 rpm	1999–2004
2.0 R.S. 182	F4R 738	DOHC 16v	1998 cc	182 PS (134 kW; 180 hp) at 6,250 rpm	200 N⋅m (148 lb⋅ft) at 5,250 rpm	2004–2006
3.0 R.S. V6	L7X	DOHC 24v	2946 cc	230 PS (169 kW; 227 hp) at 6,000 rpm	300 N⋅m (221 lb⋅ft) at 3,750 rpm	2000–2002
3.0 R.S. V6	L7X	DOHC 24v	2946 cc	255 PS (188 kW; 252 hp) at 7,150 rpm	300 N⋅m (221 lb⋅ft) at 4,650 rpm	2003–2005
Diesel
1.5 dCi	K9K	SOHC 8v	1461 cc	64 PS (47 kW; 63 hp) at 3,750 rpm	160 N⋅m (118 lb⋅ft) at 1,900 rpm	2009–2012
1.5 dCi	K9K	SOHC 8v	1461 cc	65 PS (48 kW; 64 hp) at 4,000 rpm	160 N⋅m (118 lb⋅ft) at 2,000 rpm	2001–2005
1.5 dCi	K9K	SOHC 8v	1461 cc	68 PS (50 kW; 67 hp) at 4,000 rpm	160 N⋅m (118 lb⋅ft) at 1,500 rpm	2006–2007
1.5 dCi	K9K	SOHC 8v	1461 cc	82 PS (60 kW; 81 hp) at 4,000 rpm	185 N⋅m (136 lb⋅ft) at 2,000 rpm	2002–2005
1.5 dCi	K9K	SOHC 8v	1461 cc	100 PS (74 kW; 99 hp) at 4,000 rpm	200 N⋅m (148 lb⋅ft) at 1,900 rpm	2004–2005
1.9 dTi	F9Q	SOHC 8v	1870 cc	80 PS (59 kW; 79 hp) at 4,000 rpm	160 N⋅m (118 lb⋅ft) at 2,900 rpm	2000–2001

=== Safety ===
==== Euro NCAP ====
The Clio achieved a four-star Euro NCAP rating in 2000, which was class-leading at the time.

Euro NCAP test results* Renault Clio 1.2 RTE (LHD) (2000)
Test	Score	Rating
Adult occupant:	26	4 /5 stars
Pedestrian:	13	2 /4 stars

==== Latin NCAP ====
The Clio Mío in its most basic version for Latin America with no airbags received 0 stars for adult occupants and 1 star for infants from Latin NCAP in 2013.

Latin NCAP 2.0 test results BYD F0 - NO Airbags (2016, based on Euro NCAP 2008)
Test	Points	Stars
Adult occupant:	0.00/34.0	0 /5 stars
Child occupant:	9.00/49.00	1 /5 stars

== Third generation (X85; 2005) ==
Clio III
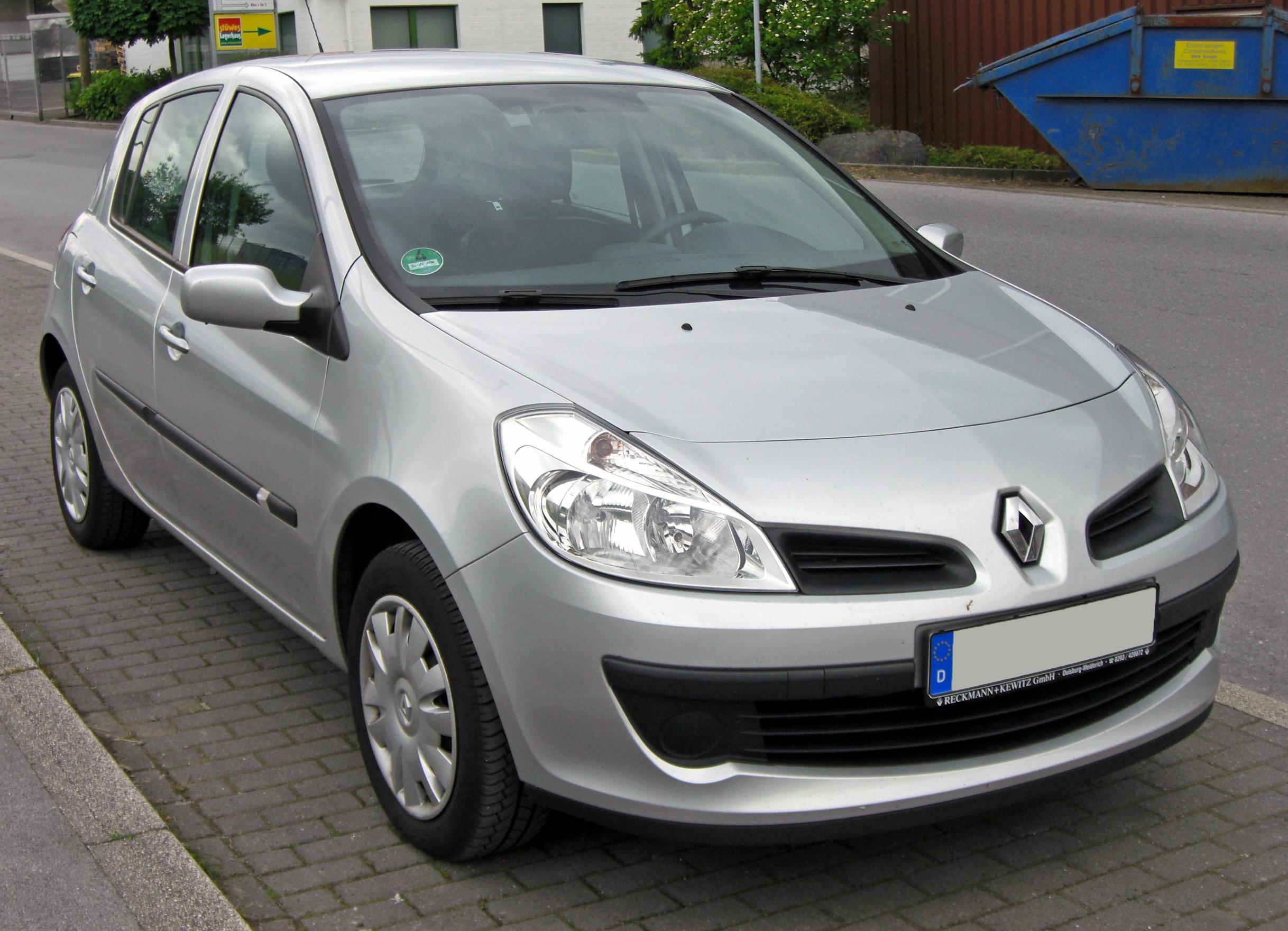

Overview
- Model code: X85
- Also called: Renault Euro Clio (Mexico); Renault Lutecia (Japan)
- Production: 1 August 2005 – 2012
- Assembly: France: Flins (Flins Renault Factory, Clio III RS); Turkey: Nilüfer, Bursa Province (Oyak-Renault, Clio HB and Clio Grandtour); Spain: Valladolid (Renault Spain)

Body and chassis
- Body style: 3/5-door hatchback 5-door estate
- Platform: Renault–Nissan B platform
- Related: Nissan Micra; Nissan Tiida Latio; Renault Modus

Powertrain
- Engine: Petrol: 1.2 L D4F/D4FT I4; 1.4 L K4J I4; 1.6 L K4M I4; 2.0 L Nissan M4R/Renault Sport F4R I4; Diesel: 1.5 L K9K I4 dCi
- Transmission: 5/6-speed manual 4-speed automatic 5-speed Quickshift automated manual

Dimensions
- Wheelbase: 2,451 mm (96.5 in); 2,575 mm (101.4 in) (estate)
- Length: 3,986 mm (156.9 in) (2005–09); 4,032 mm (158.7 in) (2009–present); 4,233 mm (166.7 in) (estate)
- Width: 1,707 mm (67.2 in) (2005–09); 1,720 mm (67.7 in) (2009–present); 1,719 mm (67.7 in) (estate)
- Height: 1,497 mm (58.9 in)
- Curb weight: 1,150 kg (2,535 lb)

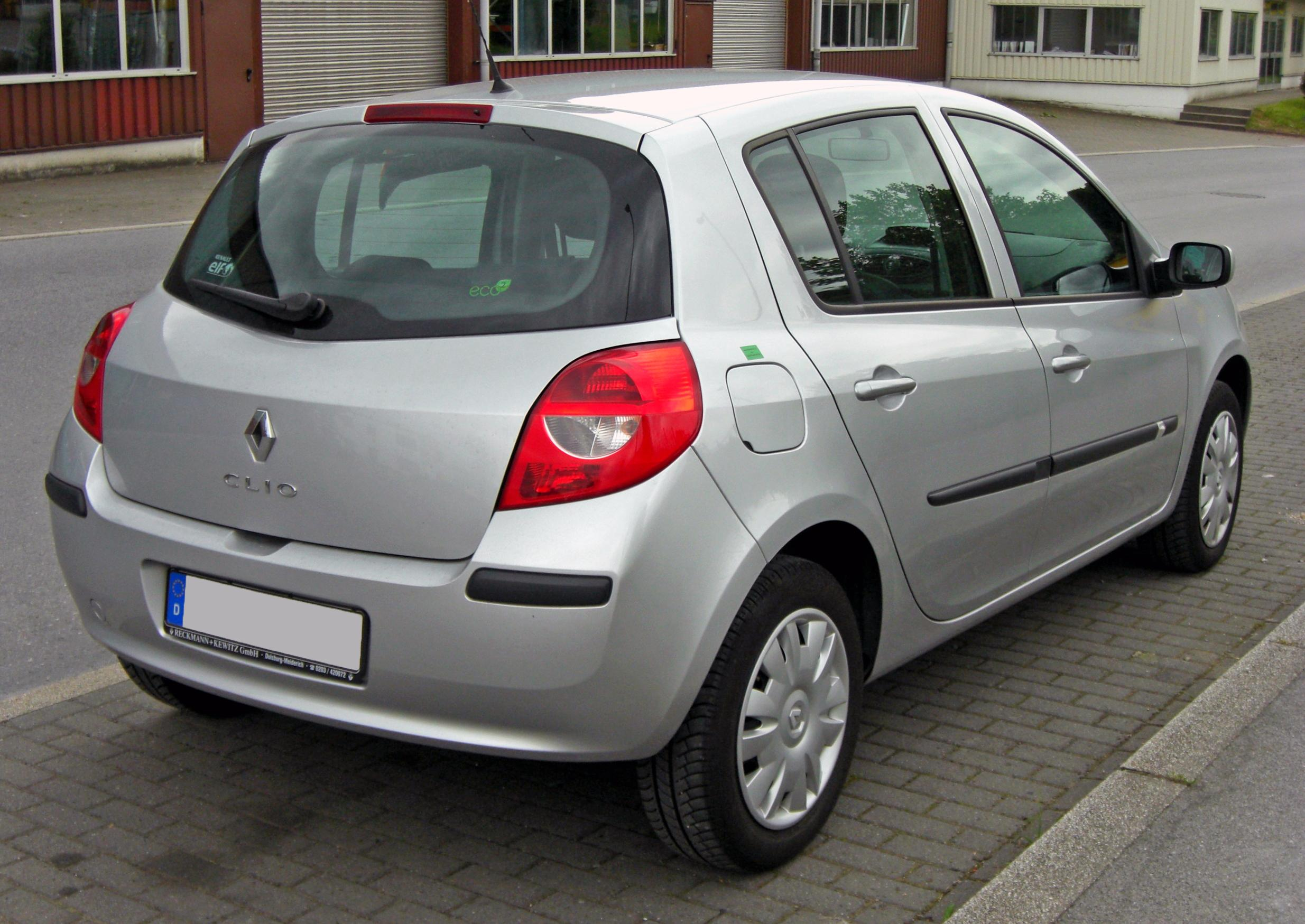
Hatchback (pre-facelift)

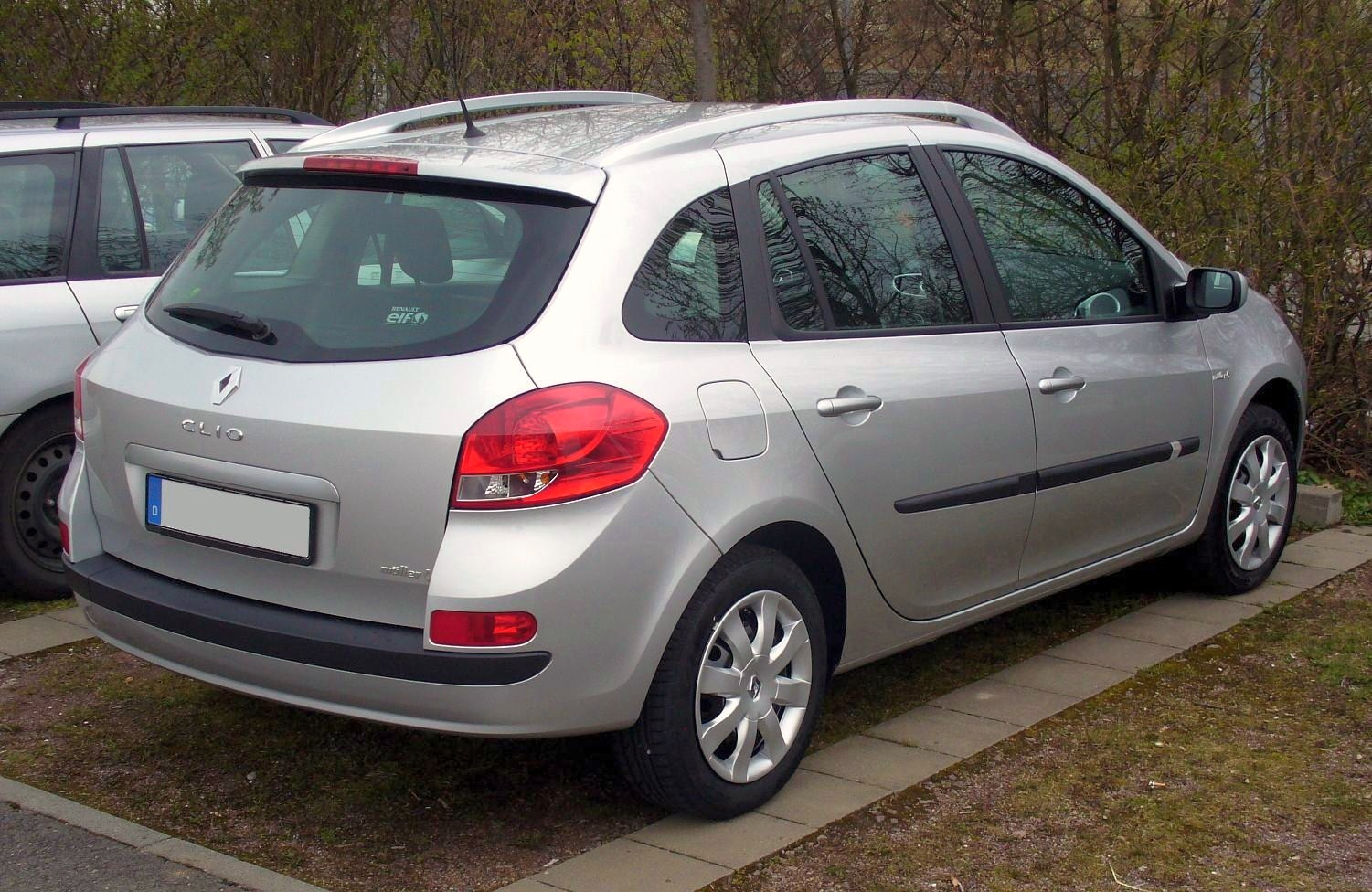
Estate (pre-facelift)

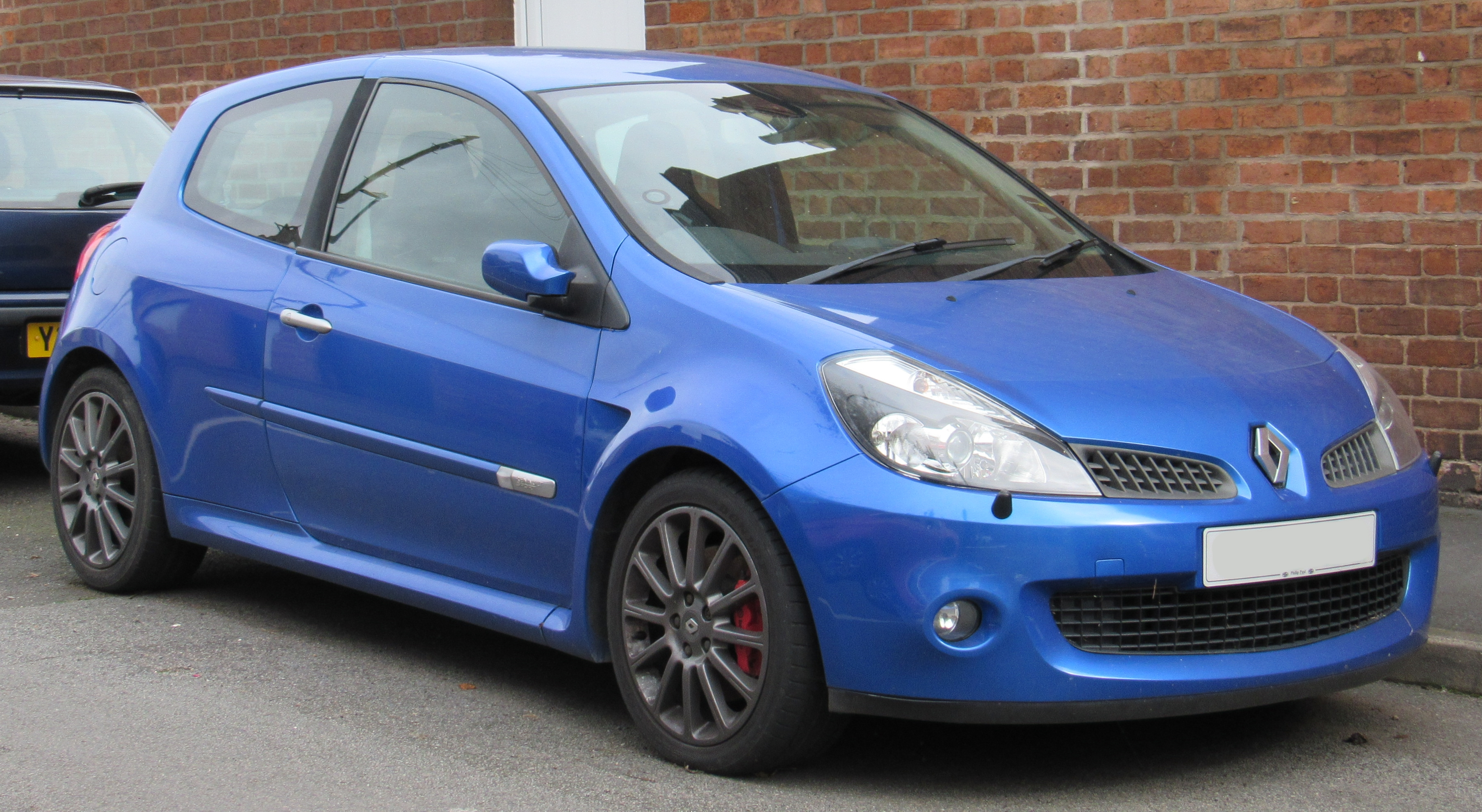

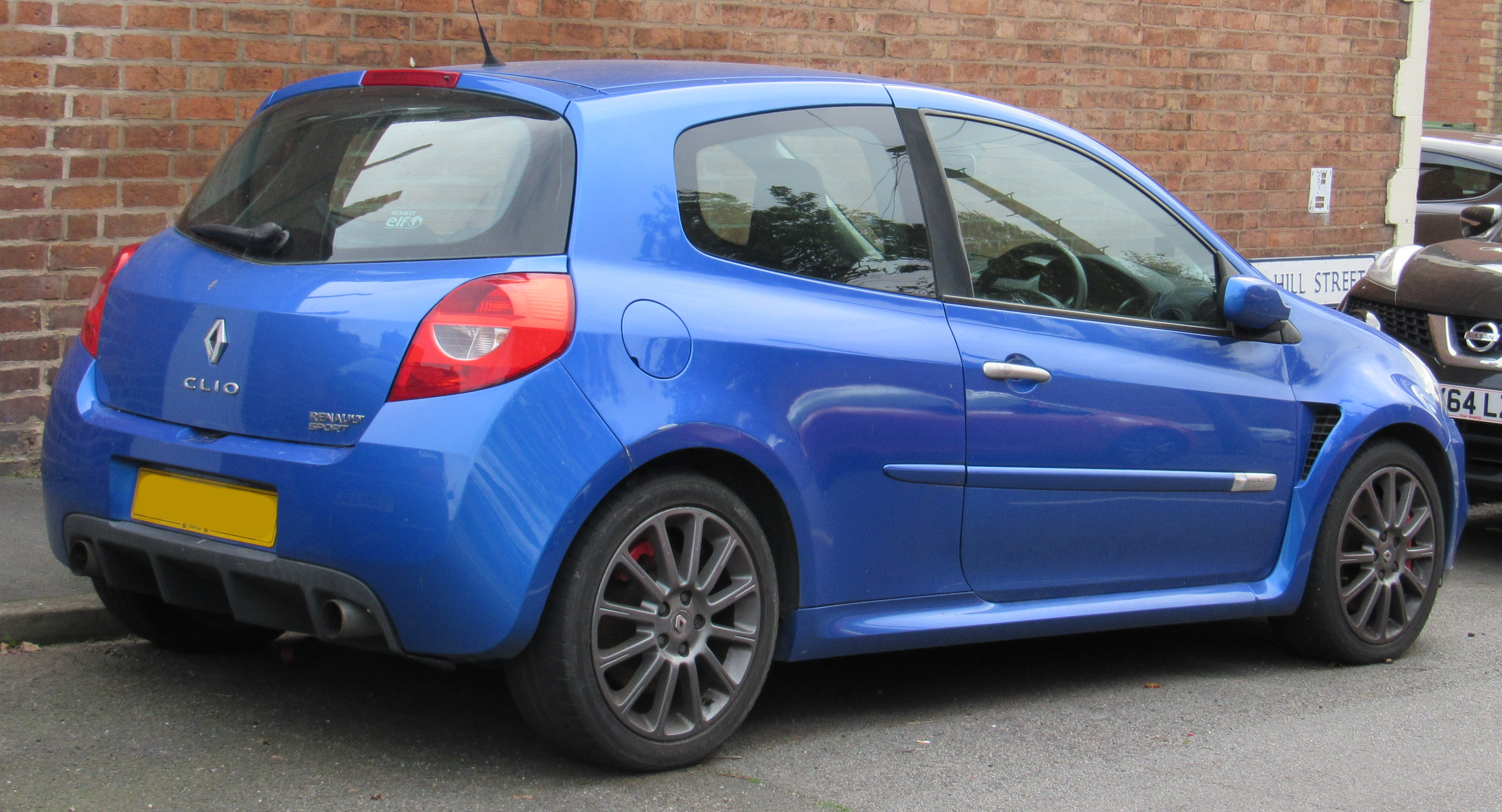
Renault Clio R.S. (pre-facelift)

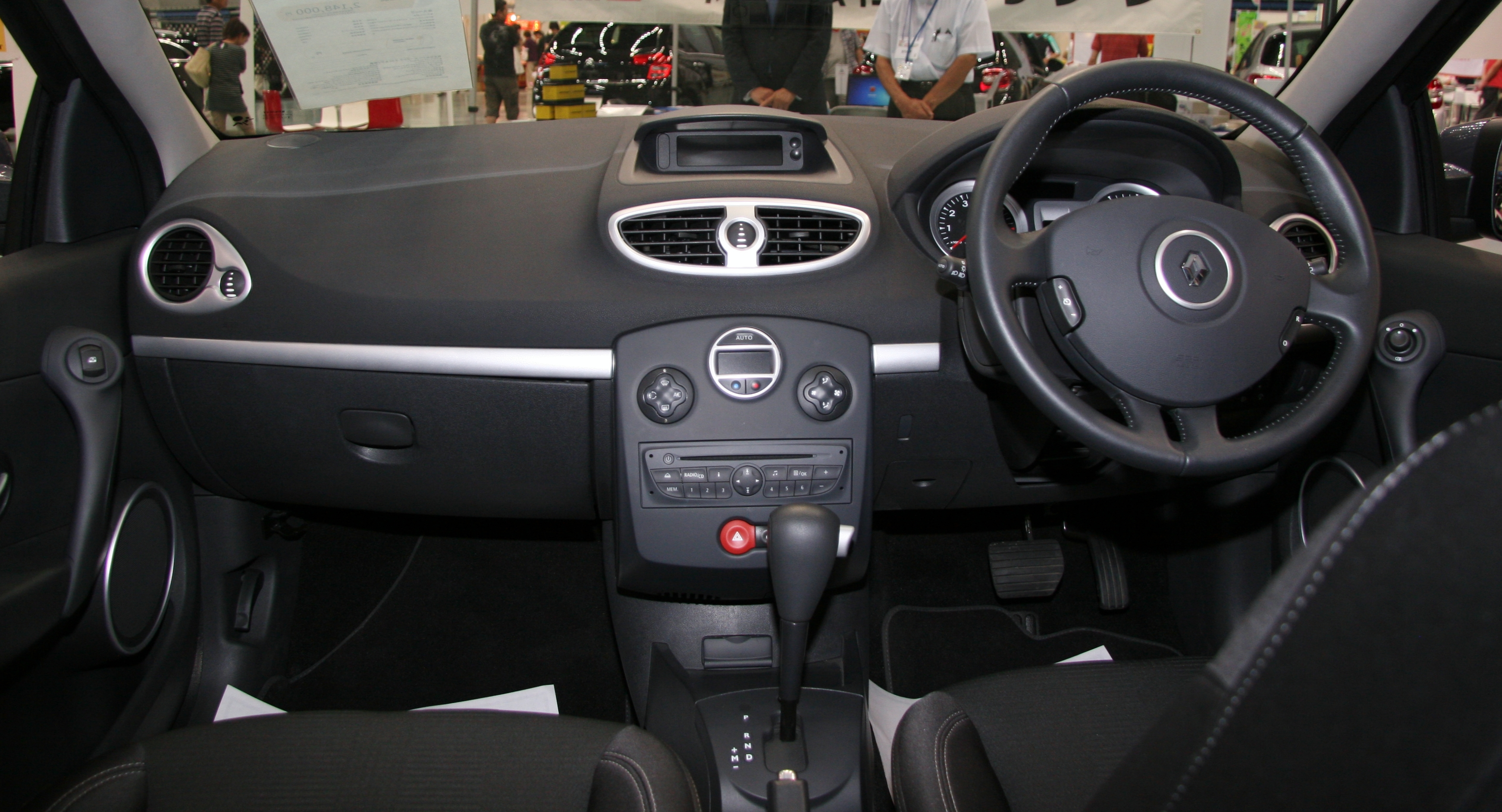
Interior

The third generation Clio was unveiled at the 2005 Frankfurt Motor Show.

The Clio III uses the Nissan B platform, co-developed with Nissan (which Renault has a share in), that is shared with the Renault Modus, the Nissan Micra, and the Nissan Note. It is considerably larger and 130 kg (287 lb) heavier as well as being more expensive than the Clio II and, at nearly 4,000 mm (157 in) in length, has almost outgrown the supermini class.

This was the result of a decision to move the Clio upmarket. It also brings the trademark "Renault Card" keyless immobiliser to the Clio for the first time. Sales began throughout Europe in October 2005.

Clio came with several trims, with the Dynamique having the most variations as it comes with four versions, namely the Dynamique, Dynamique S, Dynamique SX and Dynamique TomTom. The Clio Dynamique S comes with 4-wheel disc brakes and 16-inch alloys. Several options were offered, with others that could be added later on, like a sport exhaust made by Sebring, or rear "becquet" (spoiler), to provide a sporty look.

It was voted European Car of the Year 2006, becoming the first car to win twice, defeating the rival Volkswagen Passat by just 5 points. The Clio was described by several people as the new benchmark for its category and by one judge as a "great little car that should inspire bigger ones". The trophy for the award was presented in January 2006 to the Renault chief executive at a ceremony in Italy organized by Auto Magazine.

In June 2006, the sales of the third generation Clio Renault Sport started in France. The Clio Renault Sport is equipped with a new naturally aspirated 16-valve 2.0 L engine based on the earlier version used in the second generation Clio Renault Sport and a 6-speed manual gearbox. The engine develops 197 PS (145 kW) at 7250 rpm. The top speed is 215 km/h (134 mph) and 0–100 km/h (62 mph) takes 6.9 seconds.

An estate version called Sport Tourer in the UK was unveiled in March 2007. All Clio Estates were built in Turkey by Oyak-Renault. The Clio Estate was nearly as long as the contemporary Mégane Estate, and at 439 L (15.5 cu ft), the cargo space was larger than the 420 L (14.8 cu ft) of the Mégane. At the same time, Renault replaced the 1.4 L atmospheric engine with a new turbocharged 1.2 TCe version, with 101 PS (74 kW) and 145 N⋅m (107 lb⋅ft) of torque. In the 2nd, 3rd and 4th gears over 4500 rpm the turbocharger adds 5 extra HP.

Unlike its predecessors, the Japanese-spec Renault Lutecia III was not available at any Yanase Co., Ltd. dealership location, as Yanase had ended its import rights for Renault after Renault had acquired a stake in Nissan when the Lutecia II was still in production. Instead, the Renault Lutecia III was sold exclusively through Nissan Red Stage Store locations.

=== Phase 2 ===
==== 2009 ====
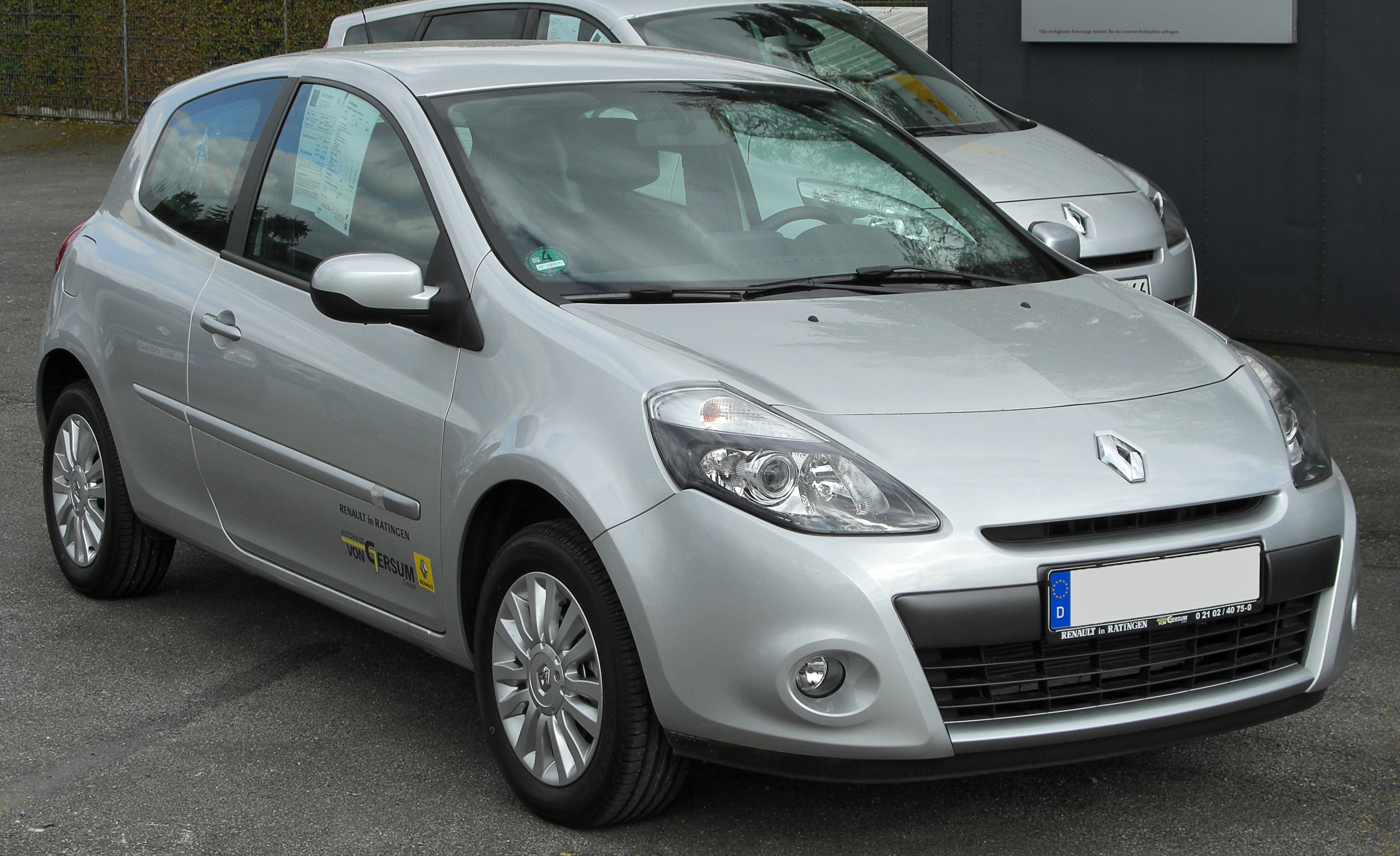

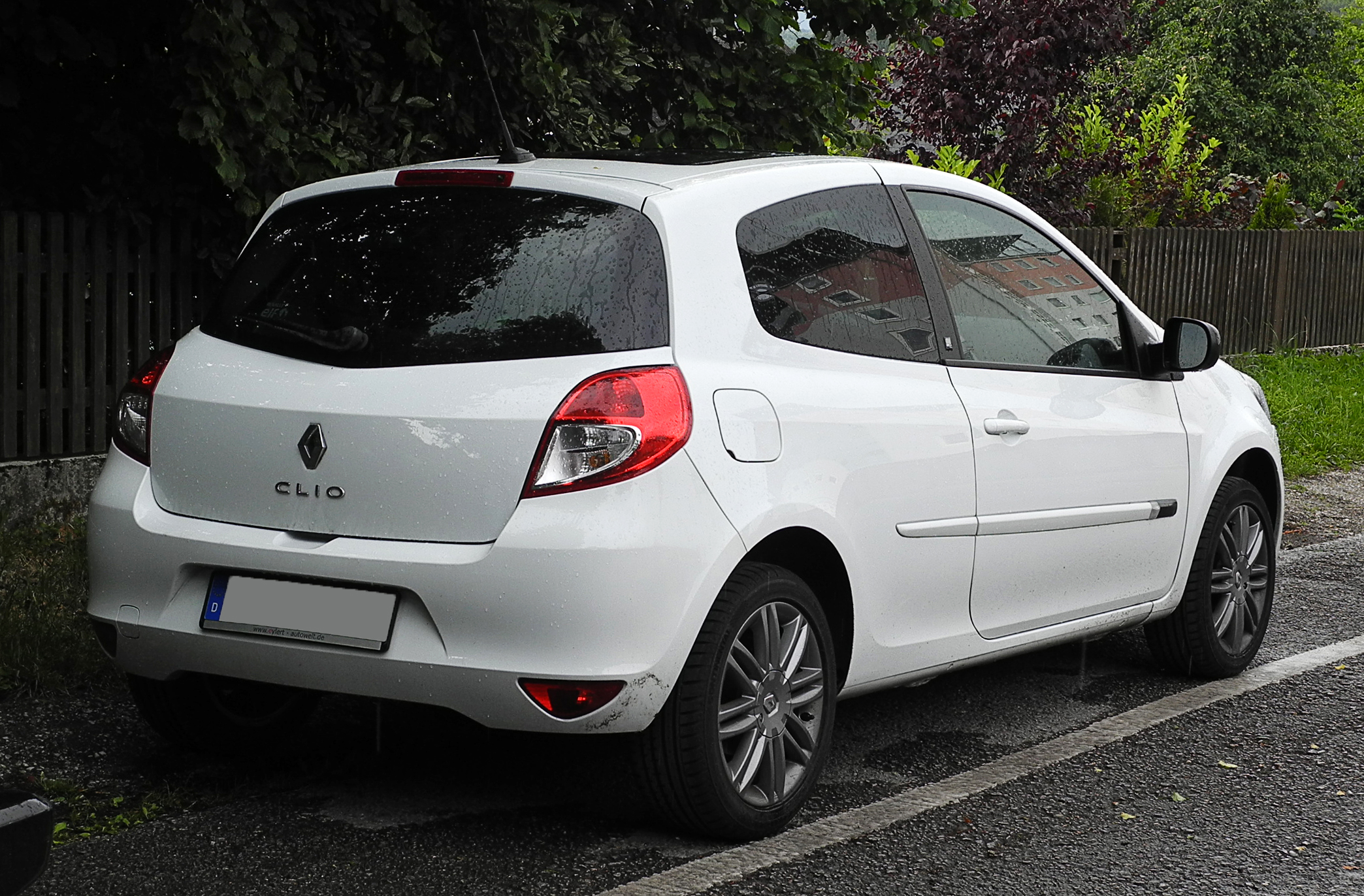
Hatchback (facelift)

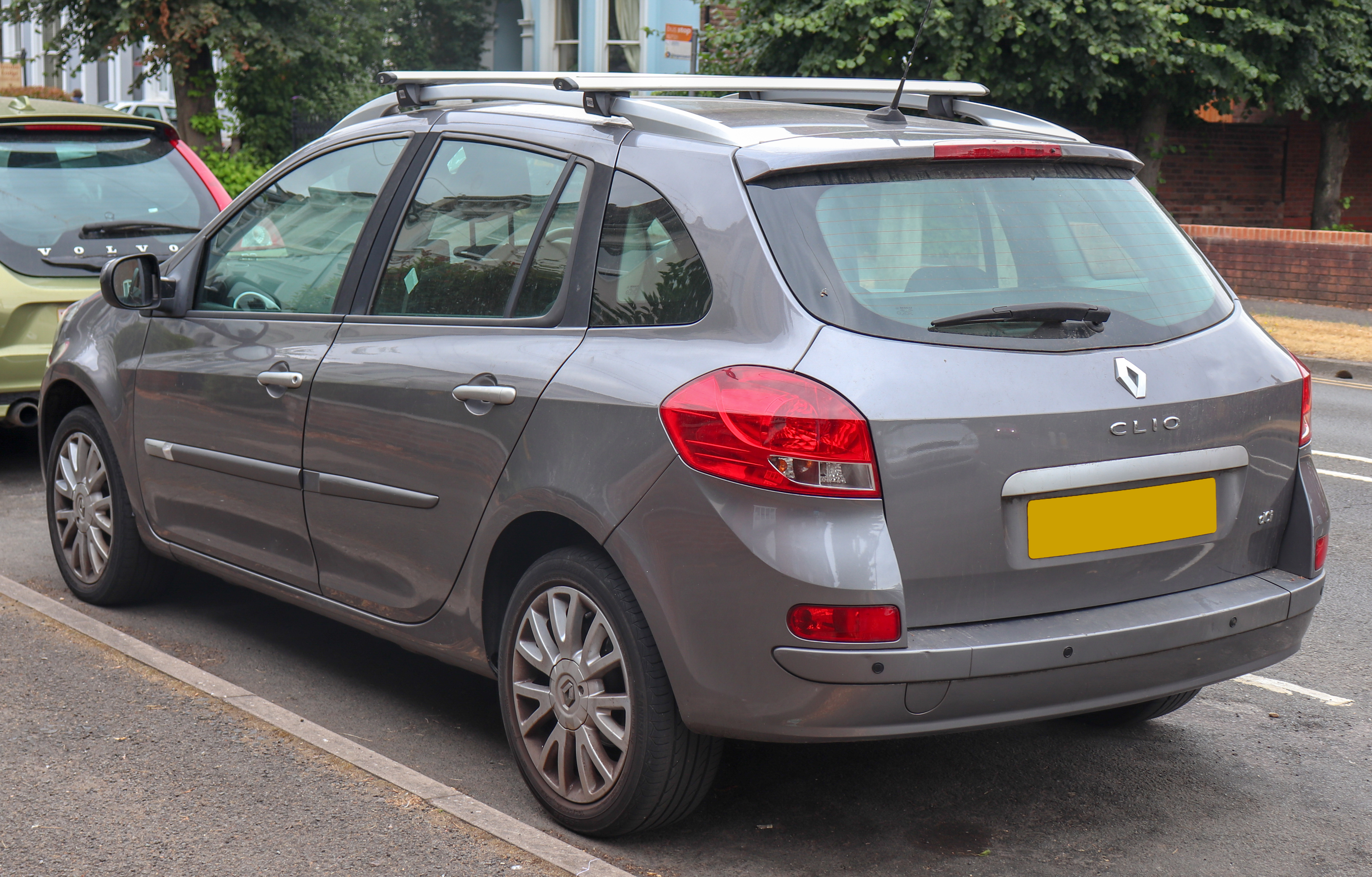
Estate (facelift)

A facelifted version of the Clio III went on sale in the United Kingdom on 15 May 2009.

It featured higher quality interior materials, more equipment, and Patrick Le Quément's third and final interpretation of the Renault family face. This more expressive look signaled a move away from individual model styling, and towards a unified, familial approach; where the car's design shares common traits or themes with other models in the lineup.

Whilst trim levels largely remained the same, new for 2009 was the Clio GT variant, a "warm hatch" intended to slot between the regular Clio and the new Clio 200 R.S.. It featured a new, aggressive front bumper, as well as a black grille, extended side sills, stiffer, R.S-style suspension, a twin-tailpipe design, and a sporty lip spoiler on the rear tailgate. There was also the addition of a TomTom navigation system (TomTom Live on later years), which was equipped as standard on higher spec trim levels ending in TomTom, such as Dynamique TomTom and Initiale TomTom, and optional extras on other trim levels.

The Renault Clio III also became the basis for the Renault Clio Gordini 20–34 (limited edition) introduced in the United Kingdom in 2010. The Clio Gordini 200 is equipped with a 2.0L F4R engine which develops 200 hp (147 kW). However, the limited edition is priced as low as the usual version.

Following the launch of the Clio IV in 2012, the Clio III range was scaled back. However, in France and Spain, it remained on sale alongside the Clio IV as the "Clio Collection". This was positioned as a value-centric alternative to the new Clio IV, and was only available in a specification equivalent to that of the entry-level Clio III. Production of the Clio Collection lasted until 2014, marking the complete cessation of Clio III production.

=== Engines ===
Model	Code	Valvetrain	Displacement	Max. power	Max. torque	Availability
Petrol
1.2 L	D4F 740	SOHC 16v	1149 cc	76 PS (56 kW; 75 hp)		KR0x
1.2 L TCe 100	D4FT	SOHC 16v	1149 cc	101 PS (74 kW; 100 hp)		2007–
1.4 L	K4J	DOHC 16v	1390 cc	98 PS (72 kW; 97 hp)		BR0x
1.6 L	K4M	DOHC 16v	1598 cc	110 PS (81 kW; 108 hp)		
1.6 L	K4M	DOHC 16v	1598 cc	112 PS (82 kW; 110 hp)		2005–
1.6 L	K4M	DOHC 16v	1598 cc	135 PS (99 kW; 133 hp)		2009–2012
2.0 L	M4R	DOHC 16v	1997 cc	138 PS (101 kW; 136 hp)		C/BR0x
2.0 L	F4R 830	DOHC 16v	1997 cc	197 PS (145 kW; 194 hp)		R.S., 2006–09
2.0 L	F4R 832	DOHC 16v	1997 cc	204 PS (150 kW; 201 hp)		R.S., 2010–
Diesel
1.5 L dCi	K9K	SOHC 8v	1461 cc	68 PS (50 kW; 67 hp)		2005–
1.5 L dCi	K9K	SOHC 8v	1461 cc	86 PS (63 kW; 85 hp)		2005–
1.5 L dCi	K9K	SOHC 8v	1461 cc	90 PS (66 kW; 89 hp)		2011–
1.5 L dCi	K9K	SOHC 8v	1461 cc	106 PS (78 kW; 105 hp)		2005–

=== Safety ===
The Clio III was the first Clio to achieve a 5-star (adult occupant) Euro NCAP rating in 2005, only two years after the larger C-segment Mégane II in 2003.

Euro NCAP test results* Renault Clio 1.5 dCi comfort (LHD) (2005)
Test	Score	Rating
Adult occupant:	33	5 /5 stars
Child occupant:	39	4 /5 stars
Pedestrian:	9	1 /4 stars

ANCAP test results* Renault Clio Series 3 available in New Zealand (2006)
Test	Score
Overall	5 /5 stars
Frontal offset	14.11/16
Side impact	15.56/16
Pole	2/2
Seat belt reminders	1/3
Whiplash protection	Not Assessed
Pedestrian protection	Poor
Electronic stability control	Not Assessed

== Fourth generation (X98; 2012) ==
Clio IV
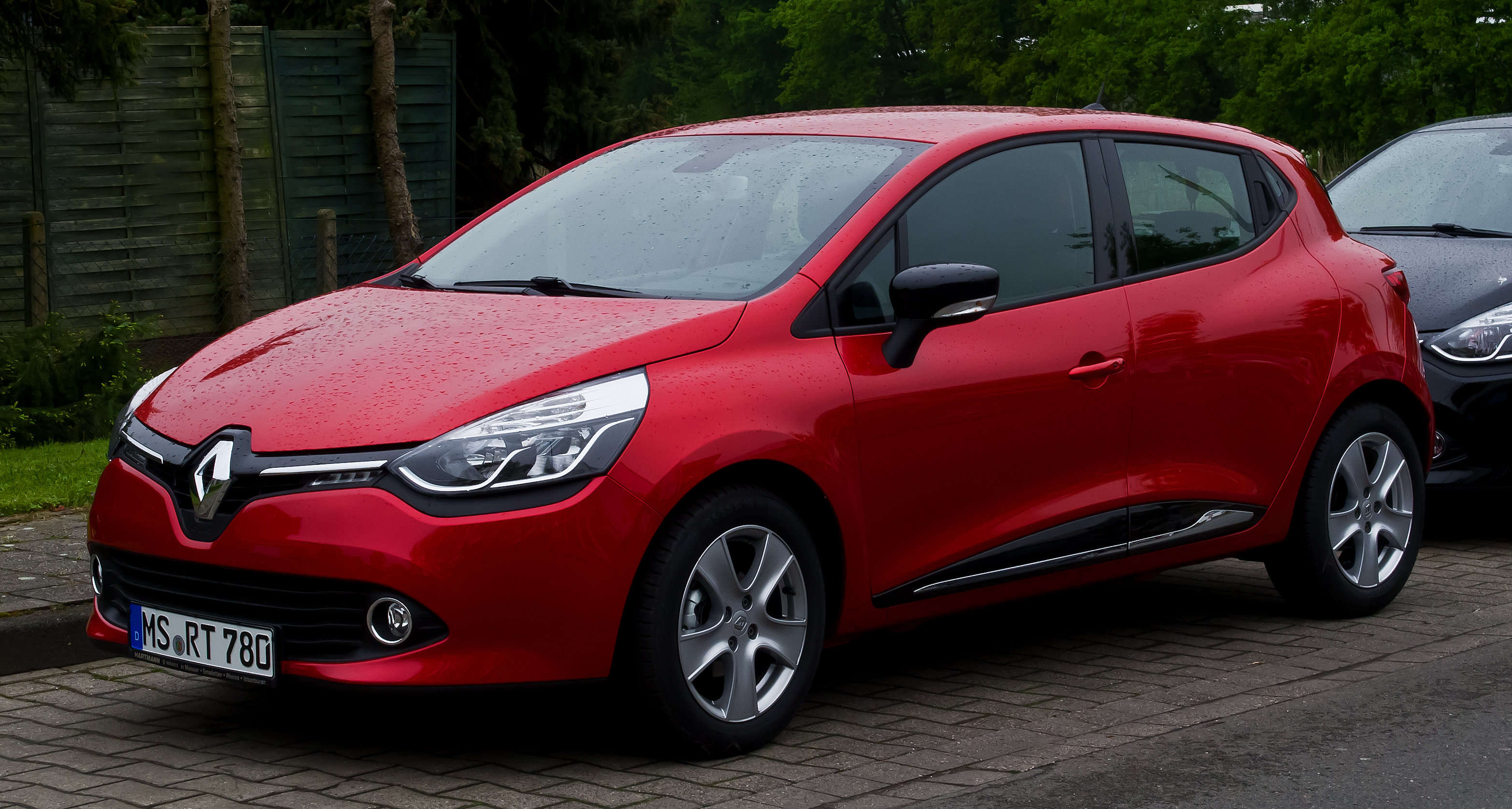
- Pre-facelift Clio Hatchback

Overview
- Model code: X98
- Also called: Renault Lutecia (Japan); Renault Clio Génération
- Production: 1 November 2012 – August 2020 (France); 1 November 2012 – 11 May 2021 (Turkey); March 2018 – 2021 (Algeria); 2018–2020 (South Korea)
- Assembly: France: Flins (Flins Renault Factory, Clio RS IV); Turkey: Nilüfer, Bursa Province (Oyak-Renault, Clio HB and Clio Sport Tourer); Slovenia: Novo Mesto (Revoz); Algeria: Oran (Renault Algérie)
- Designer: Under the lead of Laurens van den Acker

Body and chassis
- Body style: 5-door hatchback 5-door estate
- Platform: Renault–Nissan B platform
- Related: Renault Captur I Nissan Micra V Renault Clio R.S. IV

Powertrain
- Engine: Petrol: 0.9 L Renault-Nissan Alliance H4Bt turbo I3; 1.2 L D4F I4; 1.2 L Renault-Nissan Alliance H5Ft turbo I4; 1.6 L Nismo M5Mt turbo I4; Diesel: 1.5 L K9K dCi I4
- Transmission: 5-speed manual 6-speed manual 6-speed Getrag EDC

Dimensions
- Wheelbase: 2,589 mm (101.9 in)
- Length: 4,062 mm (159.9 in) (hatchback); 4,262 mm (167.8 in) (estate)
- Width: 1,732 mm (68.2 in)
- Height: 1,448 mm (57.0 in)
- Curb weight: 980–1,071 kg (2,161–2,361 lb)

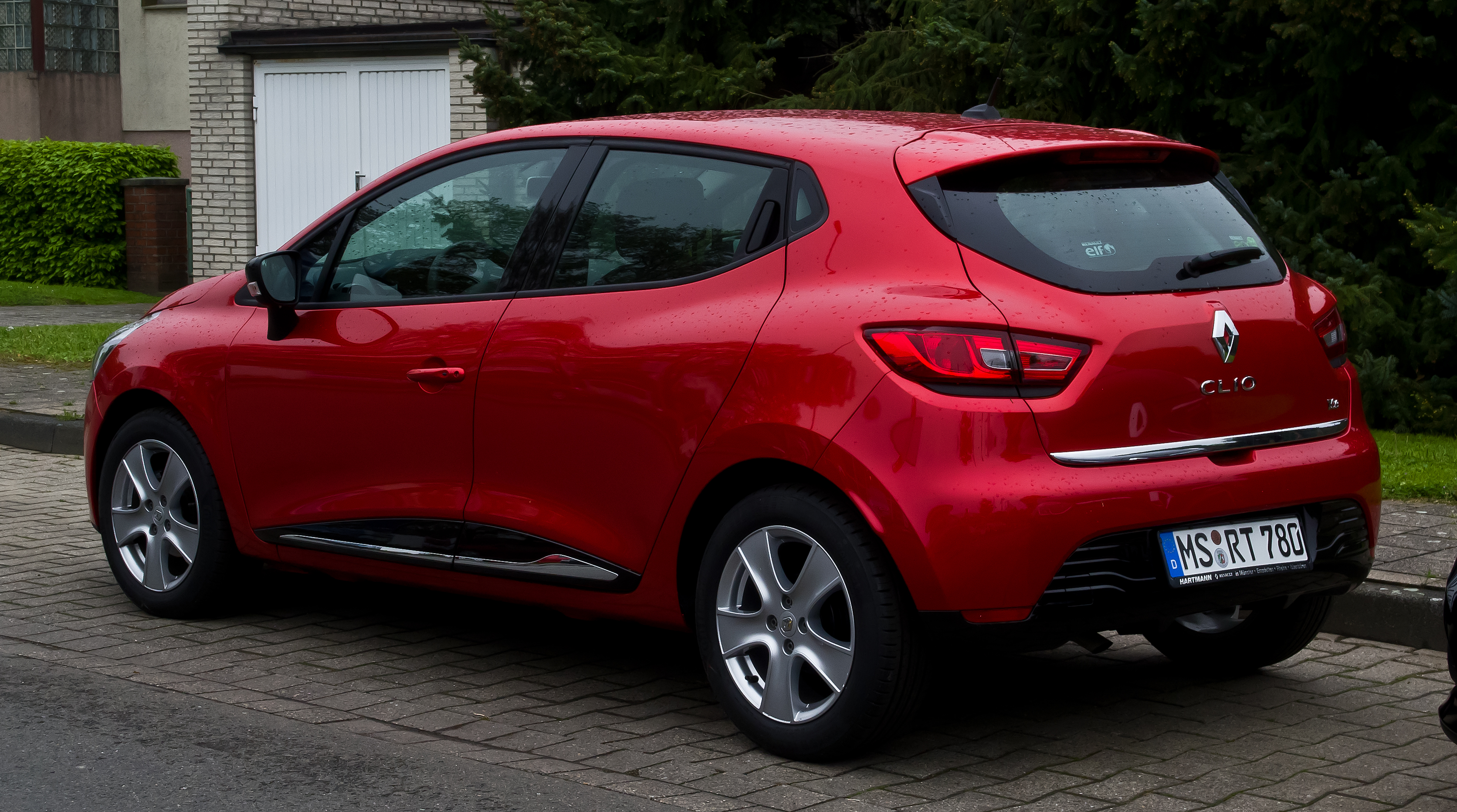
Pre-facelift Clio Hatchback (rear)

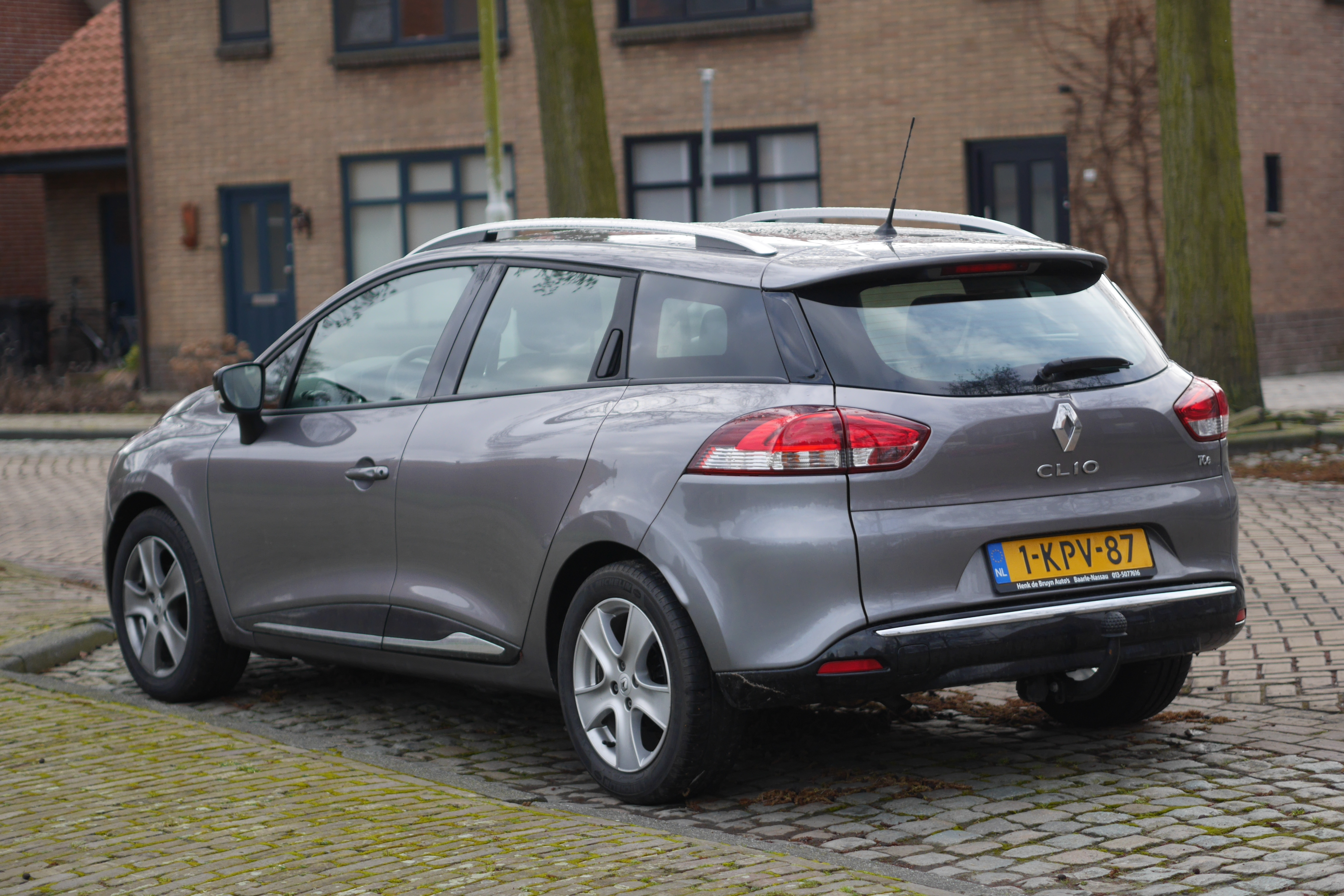
Pre-facelift Clio Estate

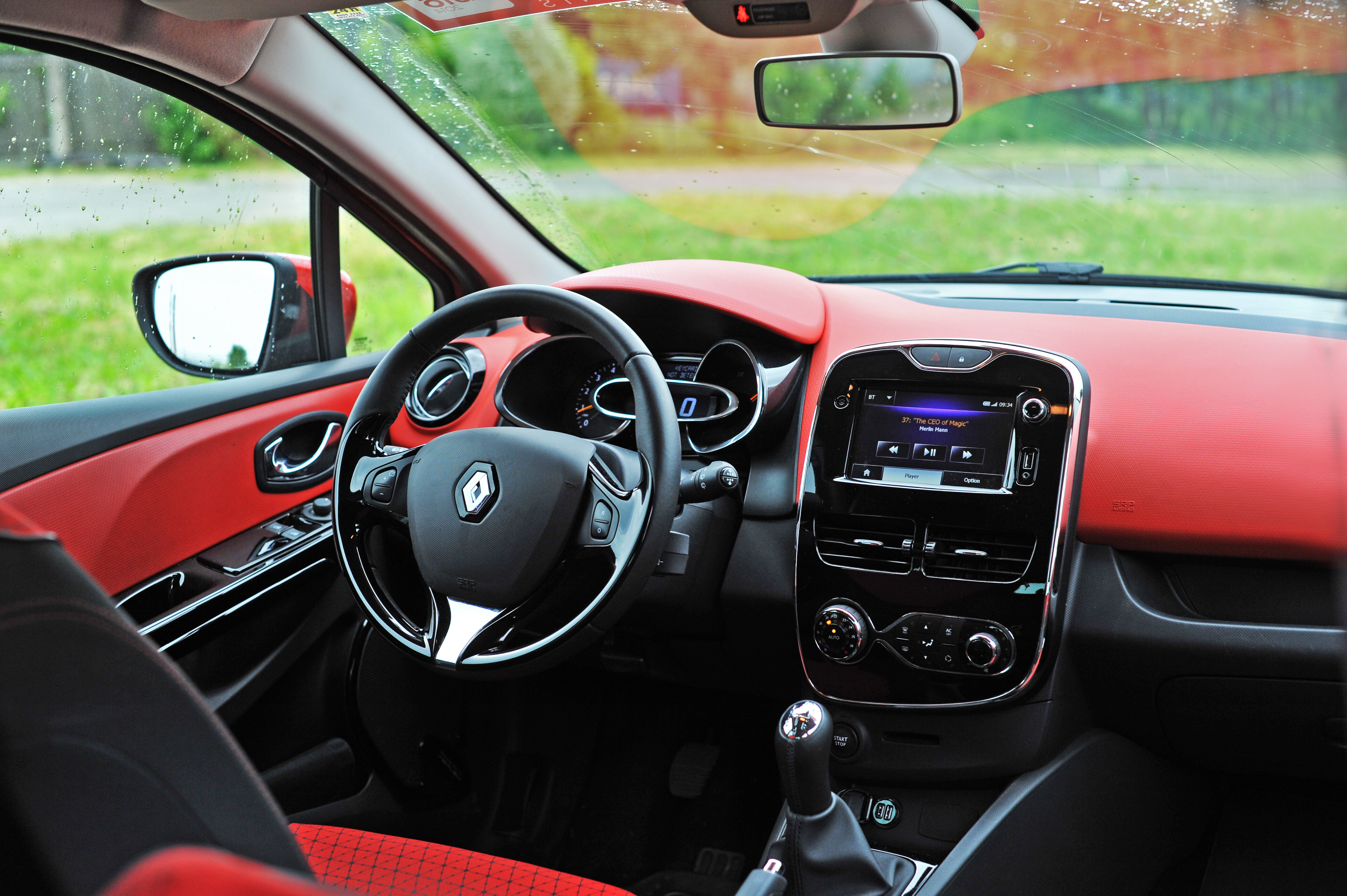
Pre-facelift Interior

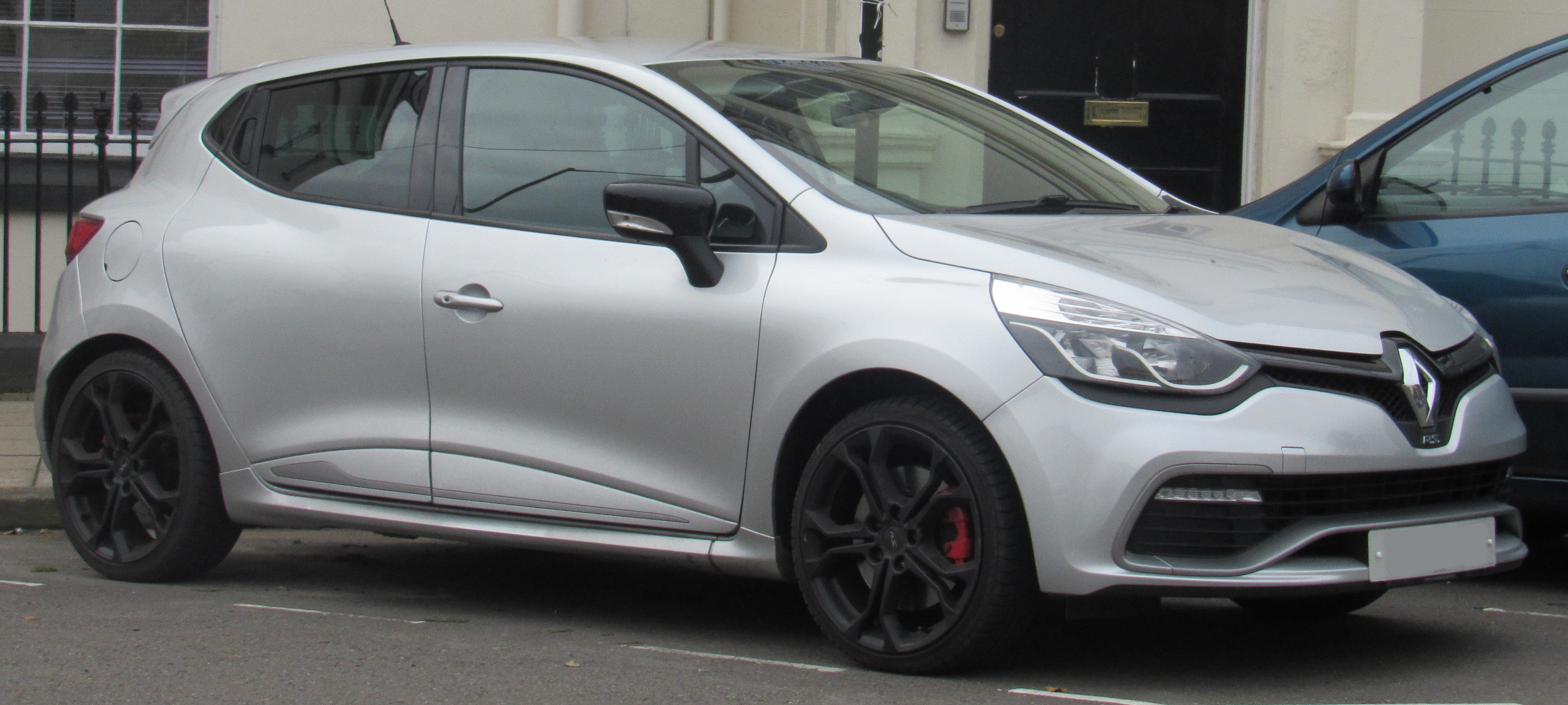
Renault Clio R.S. 200 EDC

The Clio IV was introduced at the September–October 2012 Paris Motor Show, with initial marketing beginning a month later. It was originally unveiled as a concept car in the 2011 Frankfurt Motor Show. It was available as a five-door hatchback and, from early 2013, as an estate. This was the first generation of Clio not to be available with a three-door hatchback variant.

Whilst the Clio was still manufactured in France, at Renault's Flins factory, the main production site was relocated to Bursa, Turkey, with the Estate model being produced solely at this site for all markets.

The Clio IV was only available with five doors, with "hidden" rear door handles near the windows. Another notable difference from the previous generation was the wheelbase, which had been significantly extended, closer in length to a compact car, then that of a Supermini. The overall length and width had also increased, but these changes were less significant.

The R.S. version was launched in Mexico in 2014, and was the only French-made product in Renault's Mexican lineup.

A brief time line for the Clio IV (based on the French market)

- Phase 1

Produced from October 2012 to August 2016.

- Phase 2

Produced from August 2016 to April 2019.

- Génération

Produced from April 2019 to 2020.

- October 2012: Introduced with Authentique, Expression and Dynamique
- March 2013: Introduced Estate (Authentique, Expression and Dynamique)
- April 2013: Renamed to Life, ZEN and Intens also added GT.
- September 2013: Added dCi EDC
- January 2014: Added 1.2 16V (D4F) GPL
- October 2014: Added Initiale Paris model
- March 2015: Added GT-Line (Pack Option), added Ivory paint and deleted Yellow.
- July 2015: Minor update for dashboard and steering wheel for Intens.
- April 2016: GT discontinued.
- August 2016: Introduced Phase 2.
- May 2018: Added 0.9 TCe 75.
- July 2018: Reorganize version to Trend, Limited and Intens.
- April 2019: After the commercialization of the Clio V, the Clio IV continues to be produced under the designation "Clio Génération" with only two engine options; 0.9L TCe 75 and TCe 90.

=== Clio R.S. ===
Revealed at the 2012 Paris Motor Show, the fourth-generation model eliminated the manual transmission in favour of a 6-speed EDC dual-clutch transmission (Efficient Double Clutch), developed by Renault Sport engineers. It also ditched the naturally-aspirated 2.0 unit for a 1.6 L (1,618 cc) DIG-T Nissan MR16DDT inline-four engine, developing 200 hp (147 kW) and 240 N⋅m (177 lb⋅ft) of torque.

In 2016, Renault released a facelifted version featuring new LED headlights and other minor improvements. New for 2016 was the R.S. Trophy, with an uprated engine that produces 220 PS (217 bhp; 162 kW) and 280 N⋅m (207 lbf⋅ft) In 2018, Renault released a limited edition R.S. 18. This model is only available in black with livery inspired by the colour scheme of the company's Formula 1 race car.

=== Features ===
The Clio IV featured new equipment such as Bluetooth connectivity, Reversing Camera, and a new 'R-Link' infotainment system, with more than 50 applications, including Android & TomTom. A six-speed dual-clutch transmission was also made available in early 2013.

=== Engines ===
The range of petrol engines consisted of three options: a 1.2-litre 16 valve straight-four engine, with a maximum power output of 75 hp (55 kW), a turbocharged 0.9-litre 12 valve straight-3 engine, developing 90 hp (66 kW), which can have a CO_{2} emission level of 99 g/km and a 1.2 litre turbocharged engine which produces 120 hp (88 kW). The Renault Sport version featured a turbocharged 1.6-litre four-cylinder engine producing 200 hp (147 kW) in R.S. 200 EDC trim and 220 hp (162 kW) in R.S. 220 Trophy trim.

The diesel range has two versions of the 1.5 dCi straight-4 engine, one of 75 hp (55 kW) and one of 90 hp (67 kW), which can have a CO_{2} emission level of 83 g/km.

Engine	Code	Displacement	Power	Torque	Top speed	0–100 km/h (0–62 mph)	Combined consumption (Note: According to tests, actual consumption may be 20% higher than advertised.)	CO_{2} emissions
Petrol engines
0.9 12v Energy TCe	H4Bt 400	898 cc	90 hp (66 kW) at 5250 rpm	135 N⋅m (100 lb⋅ft) at 2500 rpm	182 km/h (113 mph)	12.2 s	4.5 L/100 km (63 mpg_{‑imp})	104 g/km
0.9 12v Energy TCe 99g	H4Bt 400	898 cc	90 hp (66 kW) at 5250 rpm	135 N⋅m (100 lb⋅ft) at 2500 rpm	185 km/h (115 mph)	13.0 s	4.3 L/100 km (66 mpg_{‑imp})	99 g/km
1.2 16v 75	D4F 740	1,149 cc	75 hp (55 kW) at 5500 rpm	107 N⋅m (79 lb⋅ft) at 4250 rpm	167 km/h (104 mph)	14.5 s	5.5 L/100 km (51 mpg_{‑imp})	127 g/km
1.2 16v Energy TCe 120	H5F 408	1,197 cc	120 hp (88 kW) at 5500 rpm	205 N⋅m (151 lb⋅ft) at 2000 rpm	199 km/h (124 mph)	9.0 s	5.3 L/100 km (53 mpg_{‑imp})	118 g/km
1.6 Turbo R.S.	M5Mt 401	1,618 cc	200 hp (147 kW) at 6050 rpm	260 N⋅m (192 lb⋅ft) at 2000 rpm	229 km/h (142 mph)	6.7 s	5.9 L/100 km (48 mpg_{‑imp})	133 g/km
1.6 Turbo R.S. Trophy	M5Mt 401	1,618 cc	220 hp (162 kW) at 6050 rpm	260–280 N⋅m (192–207 lb⋅ft) at 2000 rpm (Note: 280 Nm in 4th and 5th gears.)	234 km/h (145 mph)	6.6 s	5.9 L/100 km (48 mpg_{‑imp})	135 g/km
Diesel engines
1.5 8v dCi 75	K9K 612	1,461 cc	75 hp (55 kW) at 4000 rpm	200 N⋅m (148 lb⋅ft) at 1750 rpm	168 km/h (104 mph)	14.3 s	3.6 L/100 km (78 mpg_{‑imp})	95 g/km
1.5 8v Energy dCi 90	K9K 608	1,461 cc	90 hp (66 kW) at 4000 rpm	220 N⋅m (162 lb⋅ft) at 1750 rpm	178 km/h (111 mph)	11.7 s	3.4 L/100 km (83 mpg_{‑imp})	90 g/km
1.5 8v Energy dCi 90 83g	K9K 608	1,461 cc	90 hp (66 kW) at 4000 rpm	220 N⋅m (162 lb⋅ft) at 1750 rpm	180 km/h (112 mph)	12.1 s	3.2 L/100 km (88 mpg_{‑imp})	83 g/km

=== Facelift ===
==== Phase 2 ====
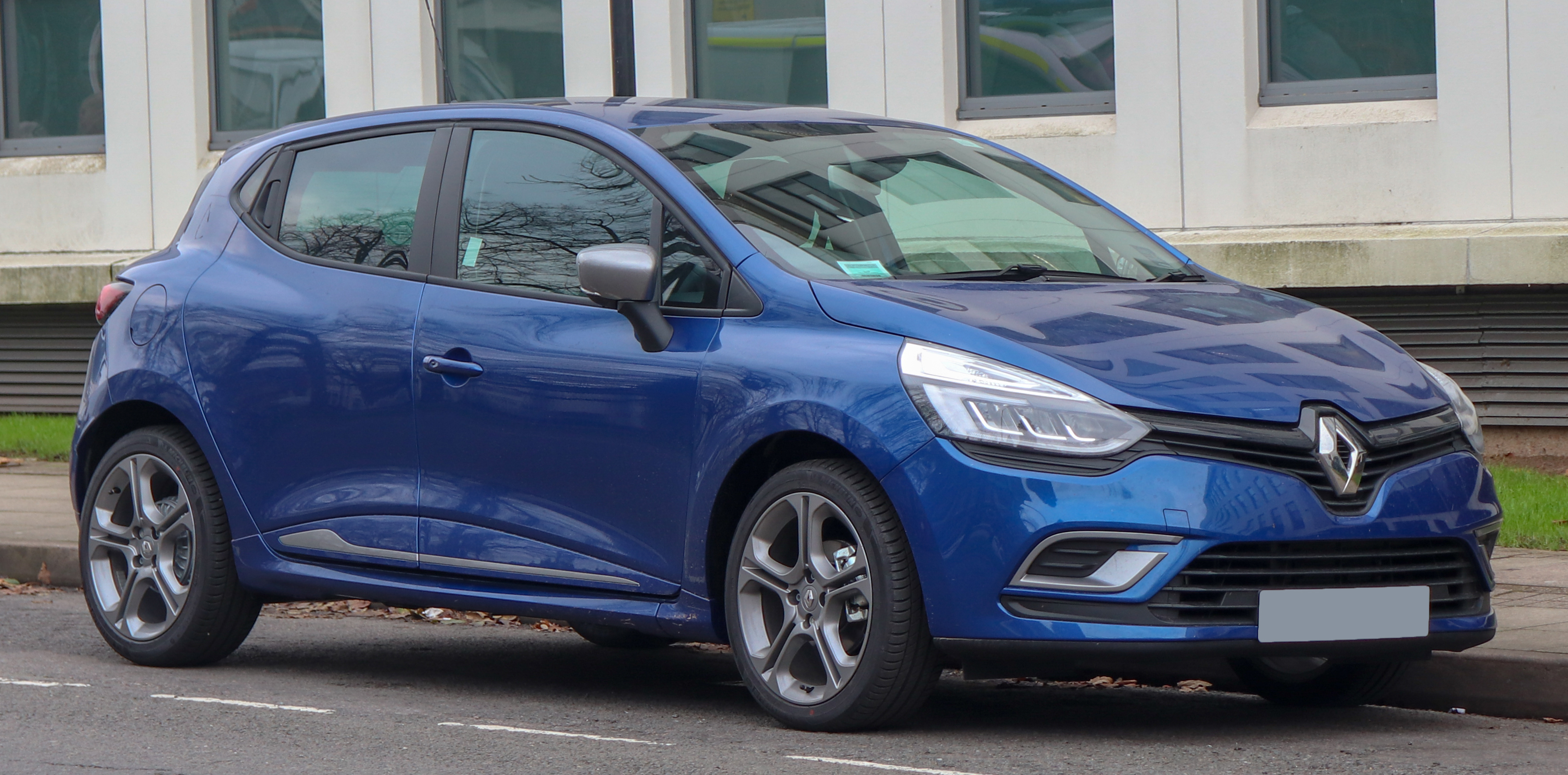

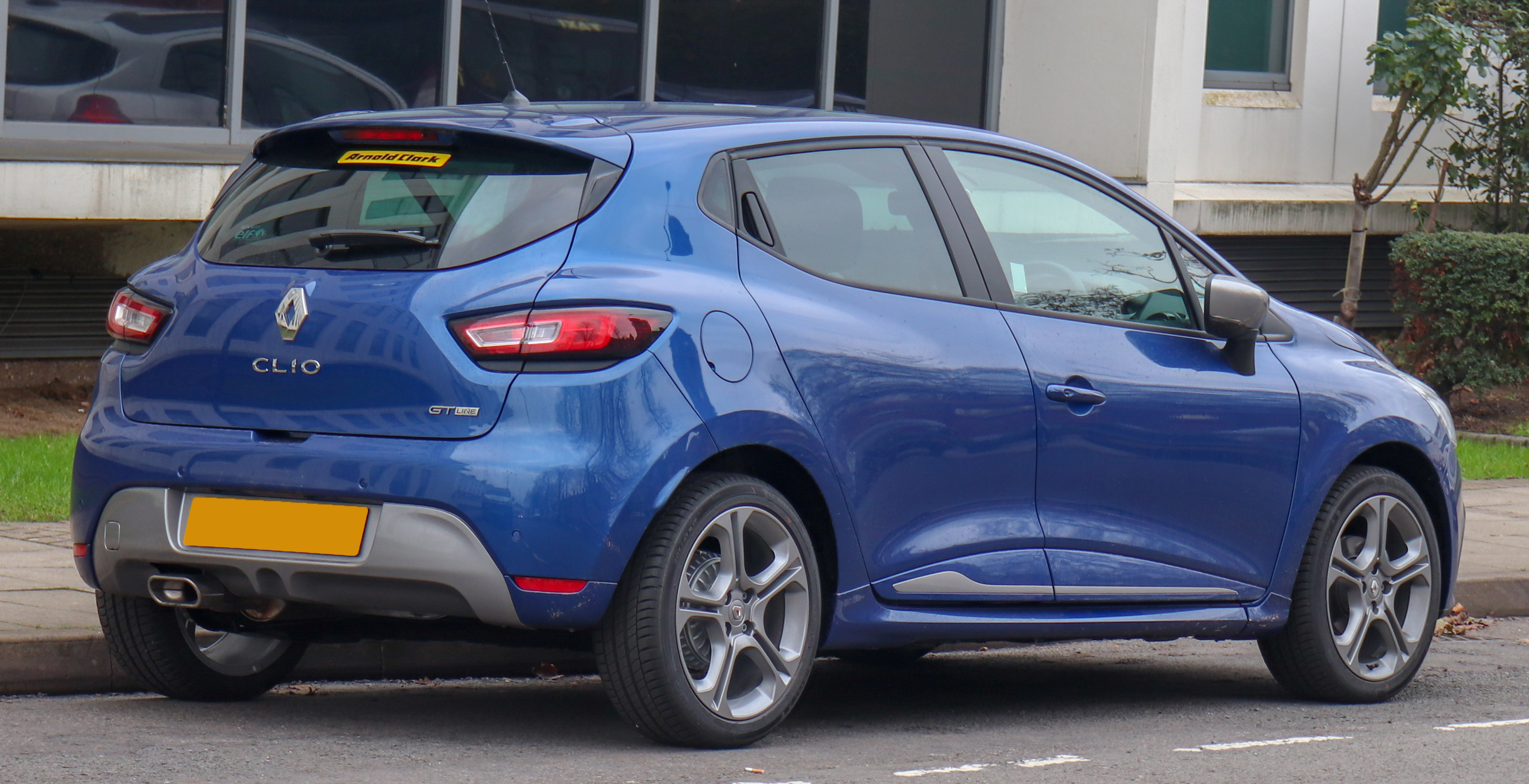
Facelift Clio Hatchback

In August 2016, the Phase 2 was launched. This introduced a mild cosmetic refresh including new LED headlights and tail lights (standard on high spec models and optional on mid spec), restyled front and rear bumpers, new alloy wheel designs, LED front fog lights and a new front grille. Inside, the Clio received a new steering wheel, updated versions of the MediaNav and R-Link systems (including the addition of DAB digital radio), new interior door panels including a new 4-way mirror adjustment control (the first time this saw a new design since Clio II), and a new gear knob.

In 2018, the Clio IV range for the UK market was significantly condensed. The trim levels were reduced to: Play, Iconic and GT-Line. The 1.6-litre R.S. model was dropped from the lineup, as were both 1.2-litre petrol engines and the 110 hp diesel. This left the engine range at the 0.9 TCe petrol engine available with either 75 hp or 90 hp, and the 1.5 dCi 90 hp diesel.

In France, despite being replaced by the fifth generation in 2019, the Clio IV (marketed as Renault Clio Génération) remained on offer until August 2020. It was still manufactured in Turkey for some markets until May 2021. After this date, the Clio IV only stays assembled in Algeria for the domestic market.

=== Safety ===
Euro NCAP test results* Renault Clio 1.0 base grade (LHD) (2012)
Test	Points	%
Overall:	5 /5 stars	
Adult occupant:	31.8	88%
Child occupant:	43.5	89%
Pedestrian:	23.7	66%
Safety assist:	6.9	99%

ANCAP test results* Renault Clio all variants (2013)
Test	Score
Overall	5 /5 stars
Frontal offset	14.87/16
Side impact	16/16
Pole	2/2
Seat belt reminders	3/3
Whiplash protection	Good
Pedestrian protection	Adequate
Electronic stability control	Standard

== Fifth generation (BJA; 2019) ==
Clio V
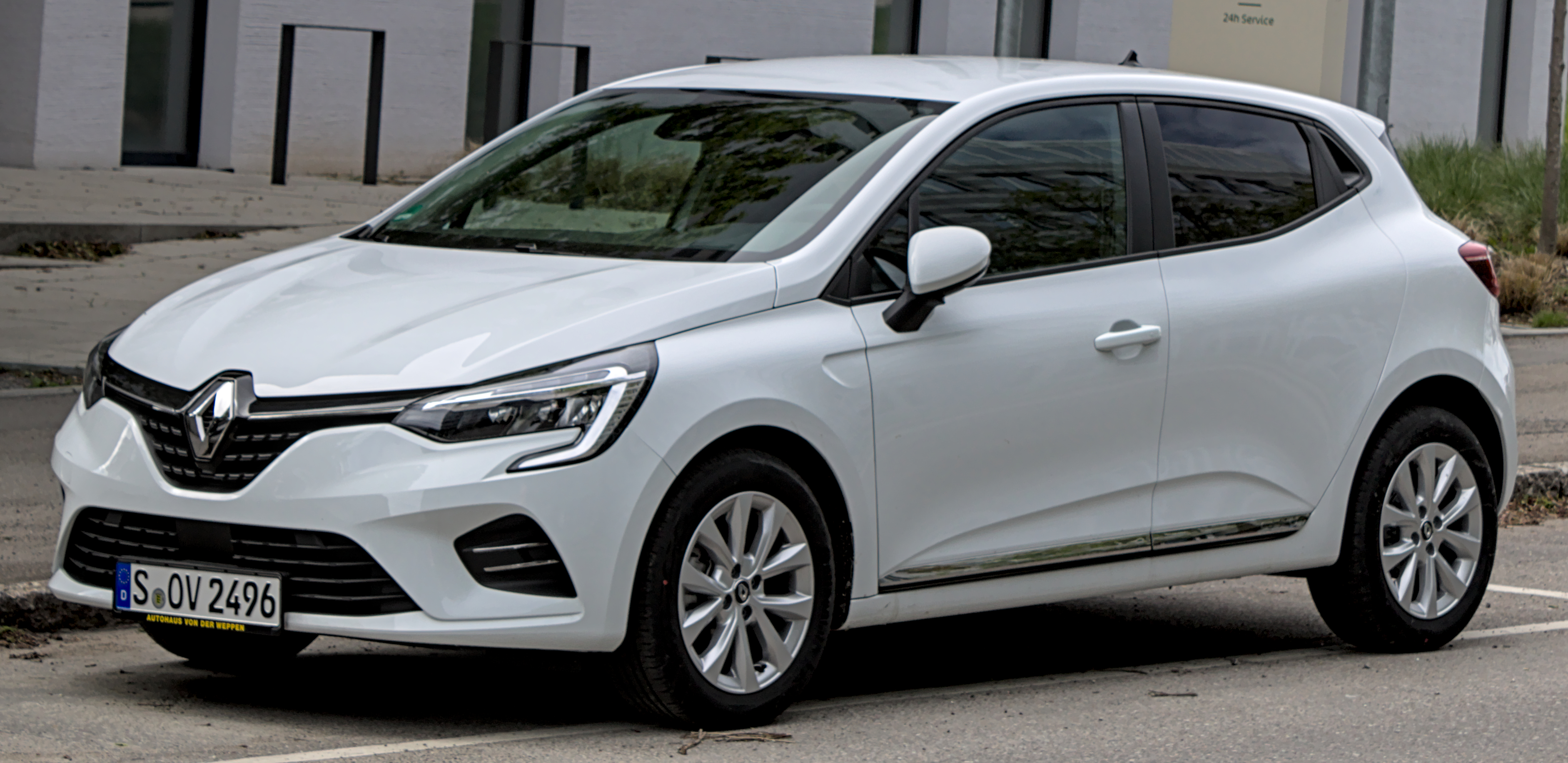

Overview
- Model code: BJA
- Also called: Renault Lutecia (Japan); Mitsubishi Colt (2023–2025)
- Production: 12 December 2018 – present
- Assembly: Turkey: Nilüfer, Bursa (Oyak-Renault); Slovenia: Novo Mesto (Revoz)
- Designer: Pierre Sabas (exterior; 2016); Magali Gouraud (interior); Under the lead of Laurens van den Acker

Body and chassis
- Body style: 5-door hatchback
- Platform: Renault–Nissan CMF-B HS platform
- Related: Renault Captur II; Mitsubishi ASX II; Renault Symbioz; Renault Arkana; Mitsubishi Colt X Nissan Juke (F16); Nissan Note (E13); Nissan Kicks (P16)

Powertrain
- Engine: Petrol: 1.0 L H4D I3; 1.0 L H5Dt turbo I3; 1.3 L H5Ht turbo I4; Petrol hybrid: 1.6 L H4M I4; Diesel: 1.5 L K9K I4
- Electric motor: 2x PMSM's (E-Tech)
- Transmission: 5/6-speed manual 7-speed Getrag EDC dual clutch automatic E-TECH multi-mode automatic transmission with 15 combinations CVT
- Battery: 1.2 kWh Li-ion (E-Tech hybrid)

Dimensions
- Wheelbase: 2,585 mm (101.8 in)
- Length: 4,050 mm (159.4 in)
- Width: 1,798 mm (70.8 in)
- Height: 1,440 mm (56.7 in)

The fifth generation model was unveiled at the 2019 Geneva Motor Show. It was originally planned to be unveiled at the 2018 Paris Motor Show, but it was later delayed. It is the first model to use the CMF-B HS platform, shared with the second-generation Renault Captur and Nissan Juke among others.

The fifth generation features an interior that uses higher quality materials and finishes (for higher trim levels) than the previous one, sporty seats and a redesigned, more compact steering wheel.

On higher trim levels it can be equipped with a 9.3-inch touchscreen (with Easy Link system, compatible with Android Auto and Apple CarPlay and equipped with Google Maps and TomTom navigation), customizable instrument cluster that uses a TFT LCD, an electric parking brake, a wireless smartphone charger, hands-free parking, a 360-degree system with four cameras, lane keeping assistant, adaptive cruise control and recognition of road signs, blind spot warning and automatic emergency braking.

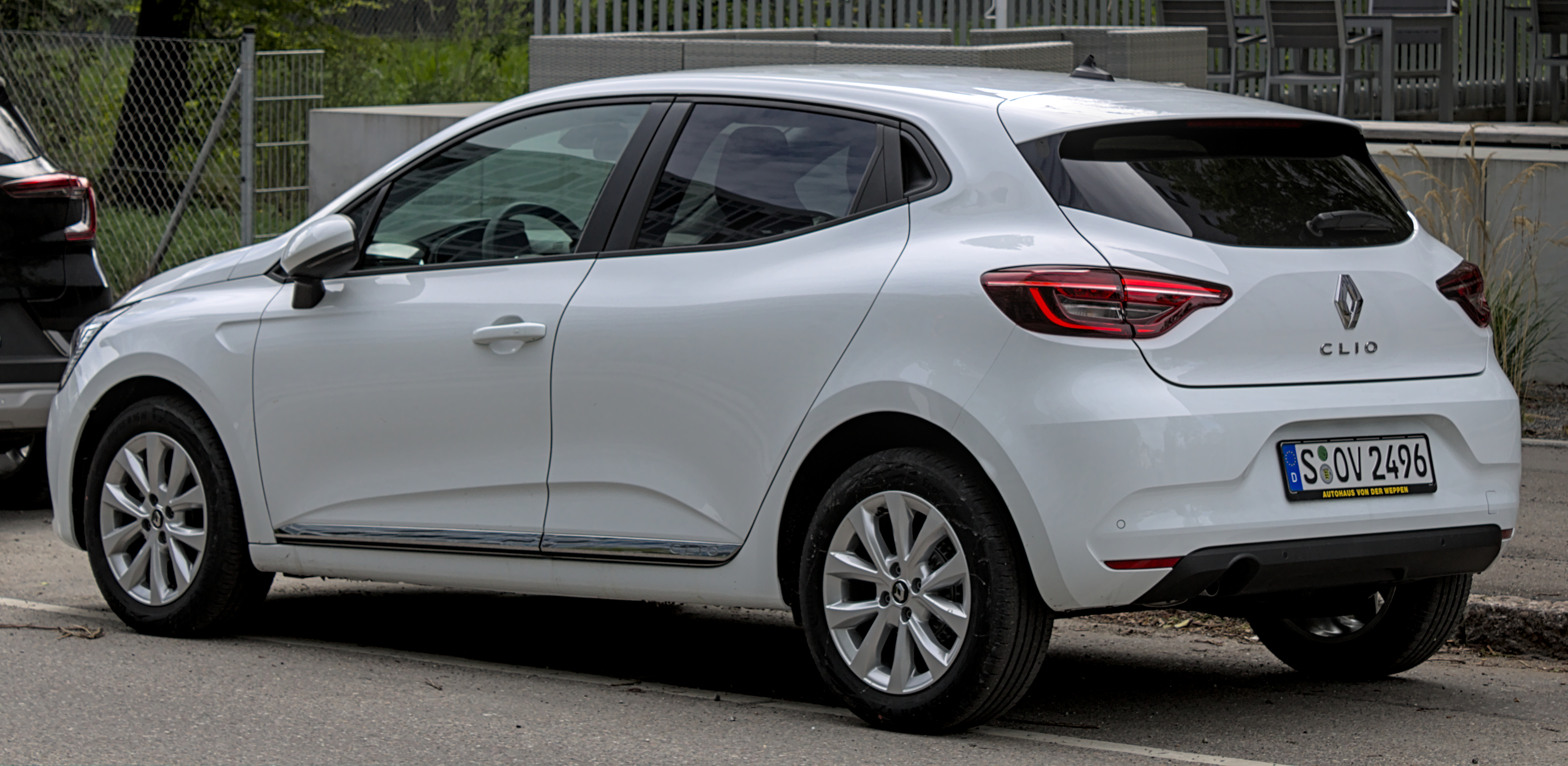
Clio (pre-facelift)

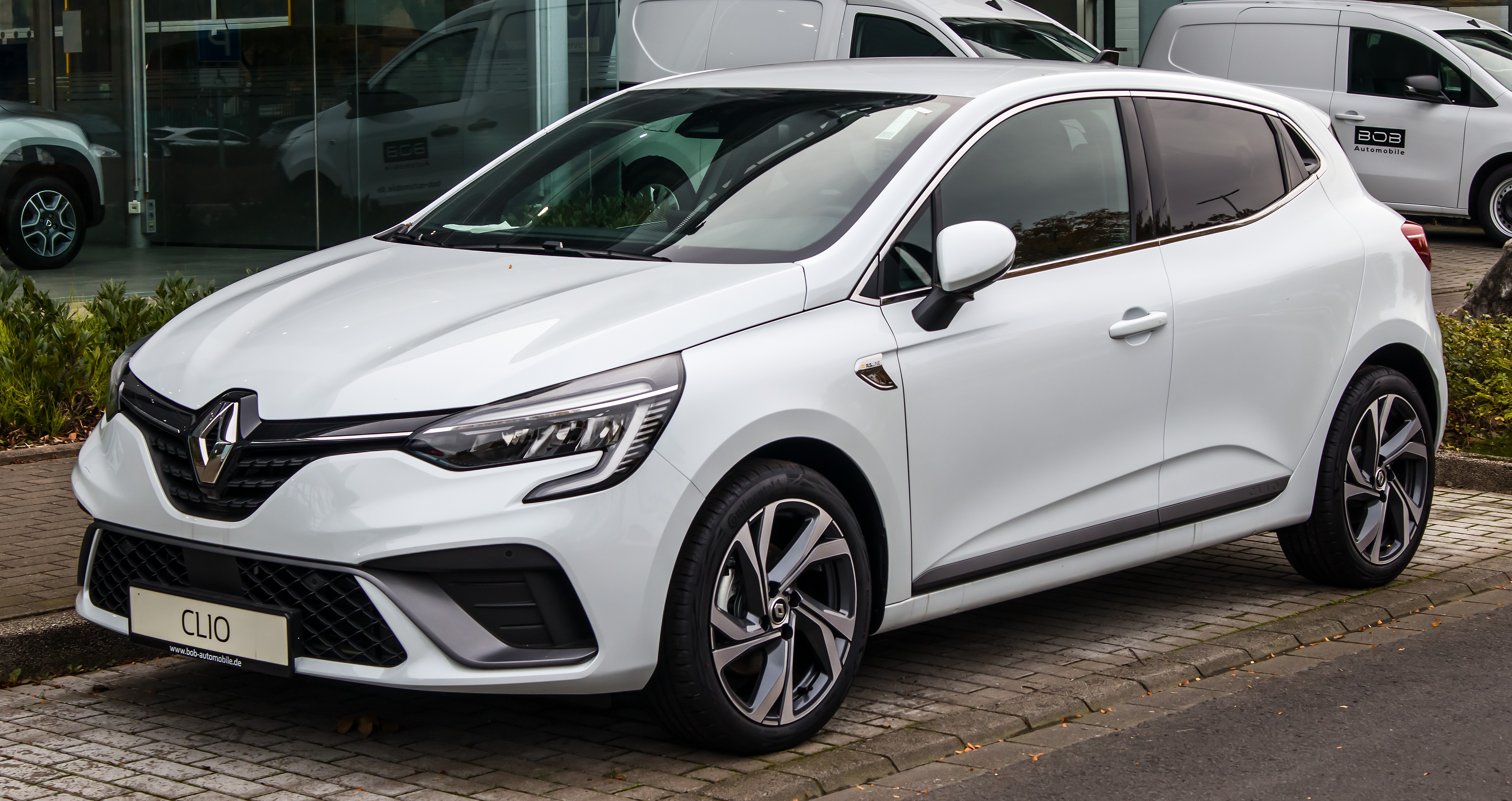
Clio RS Line

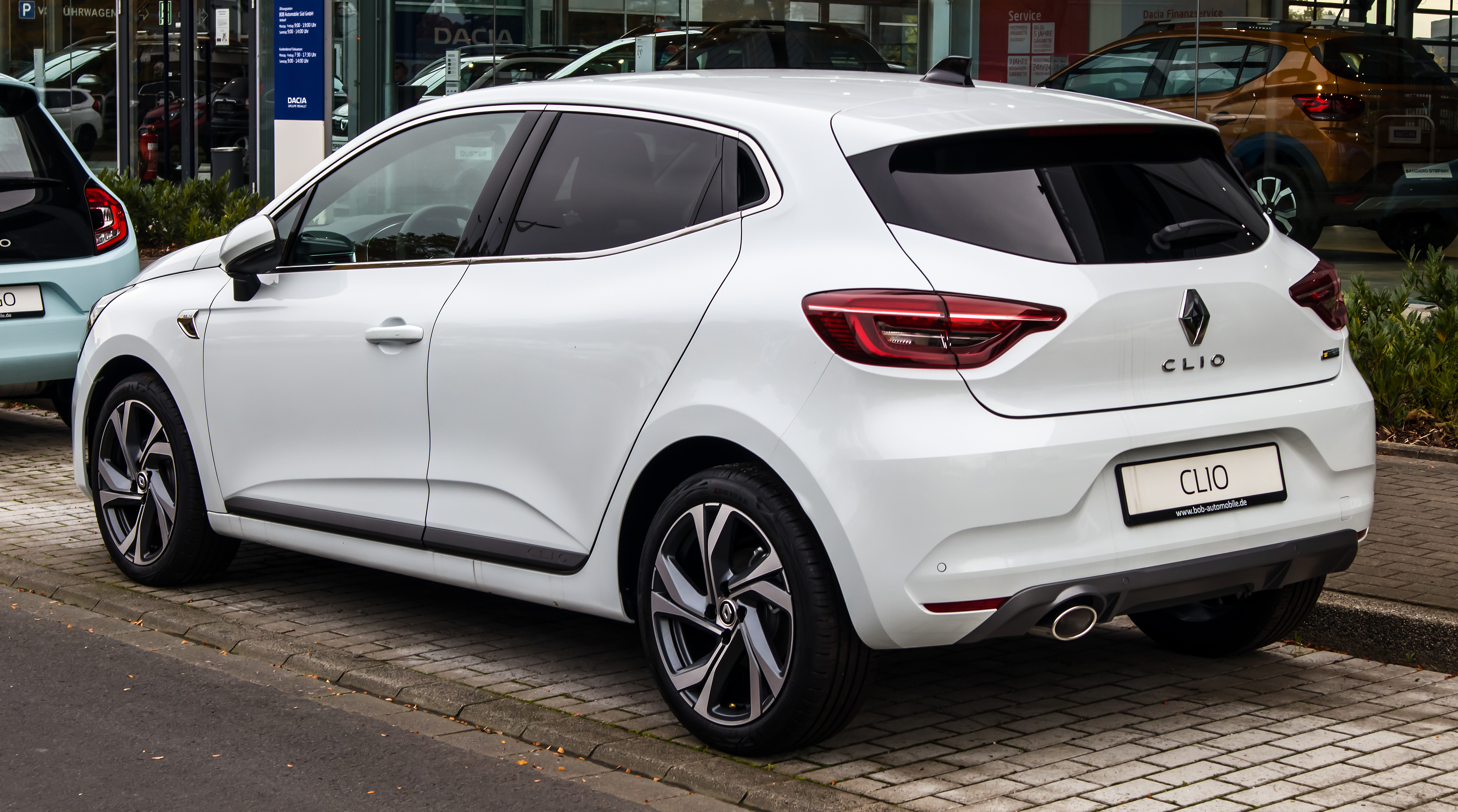
Rear view

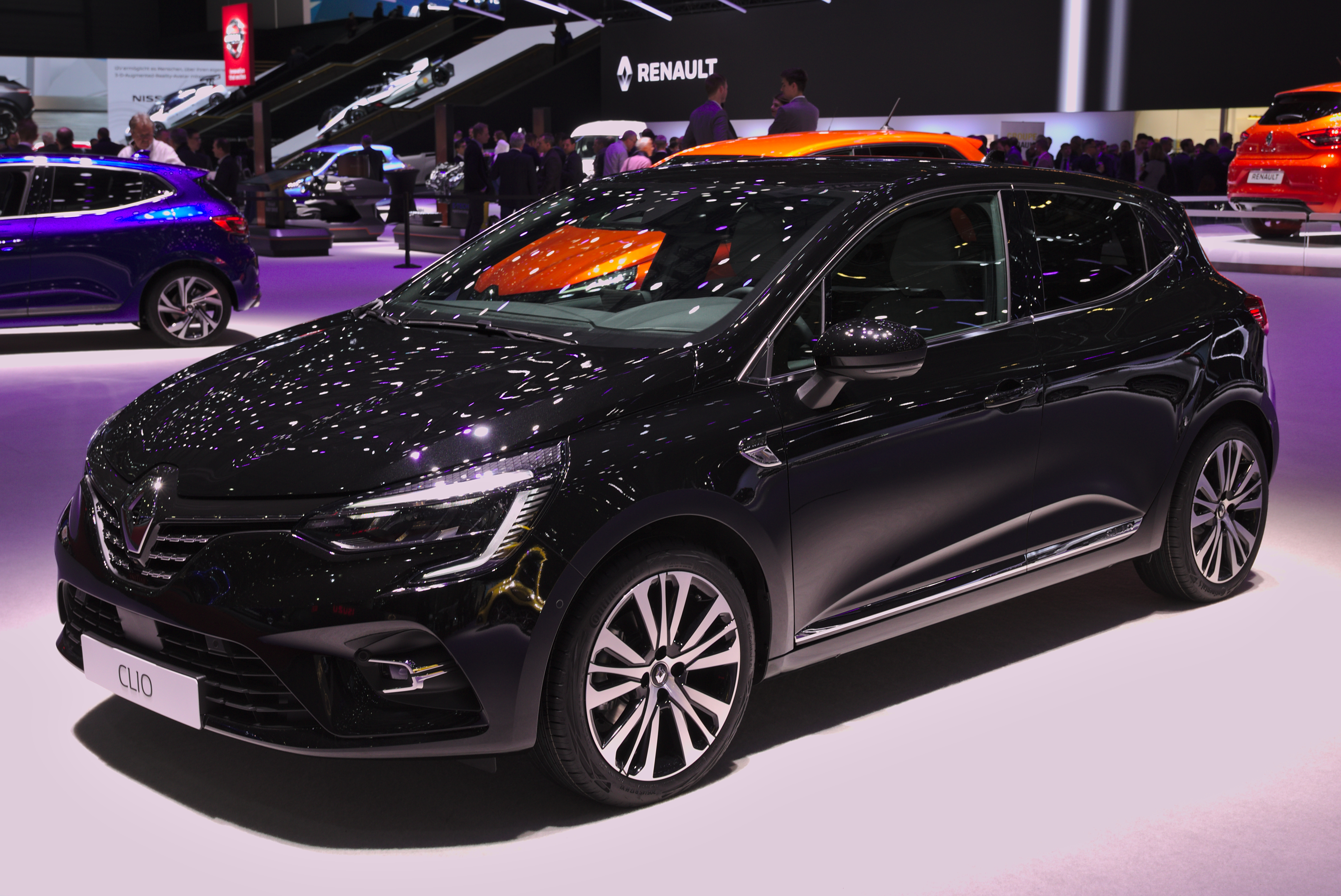
Clio Initiale Paris

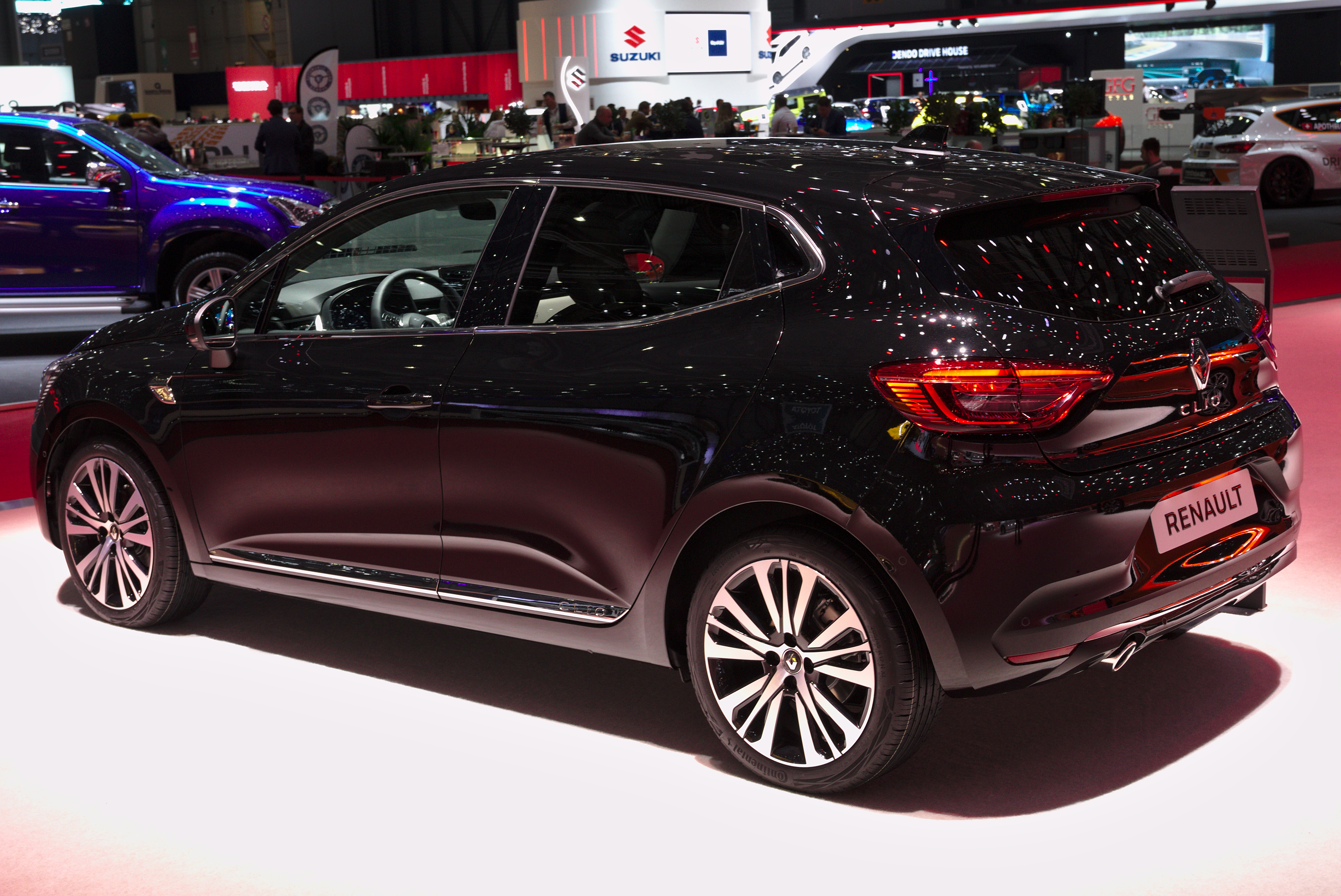
Rear view

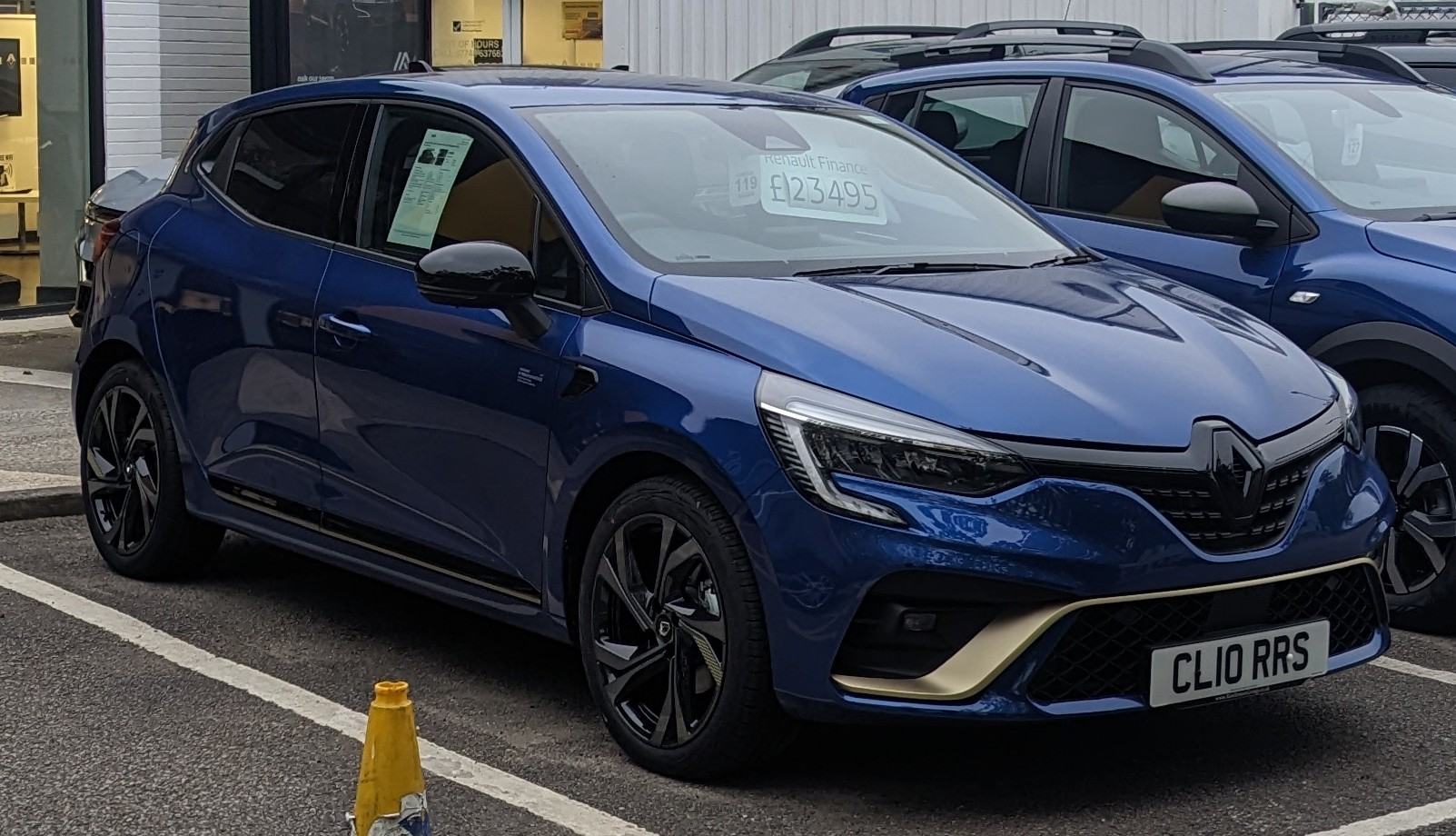
Clio E-Tech (pre-facelift)

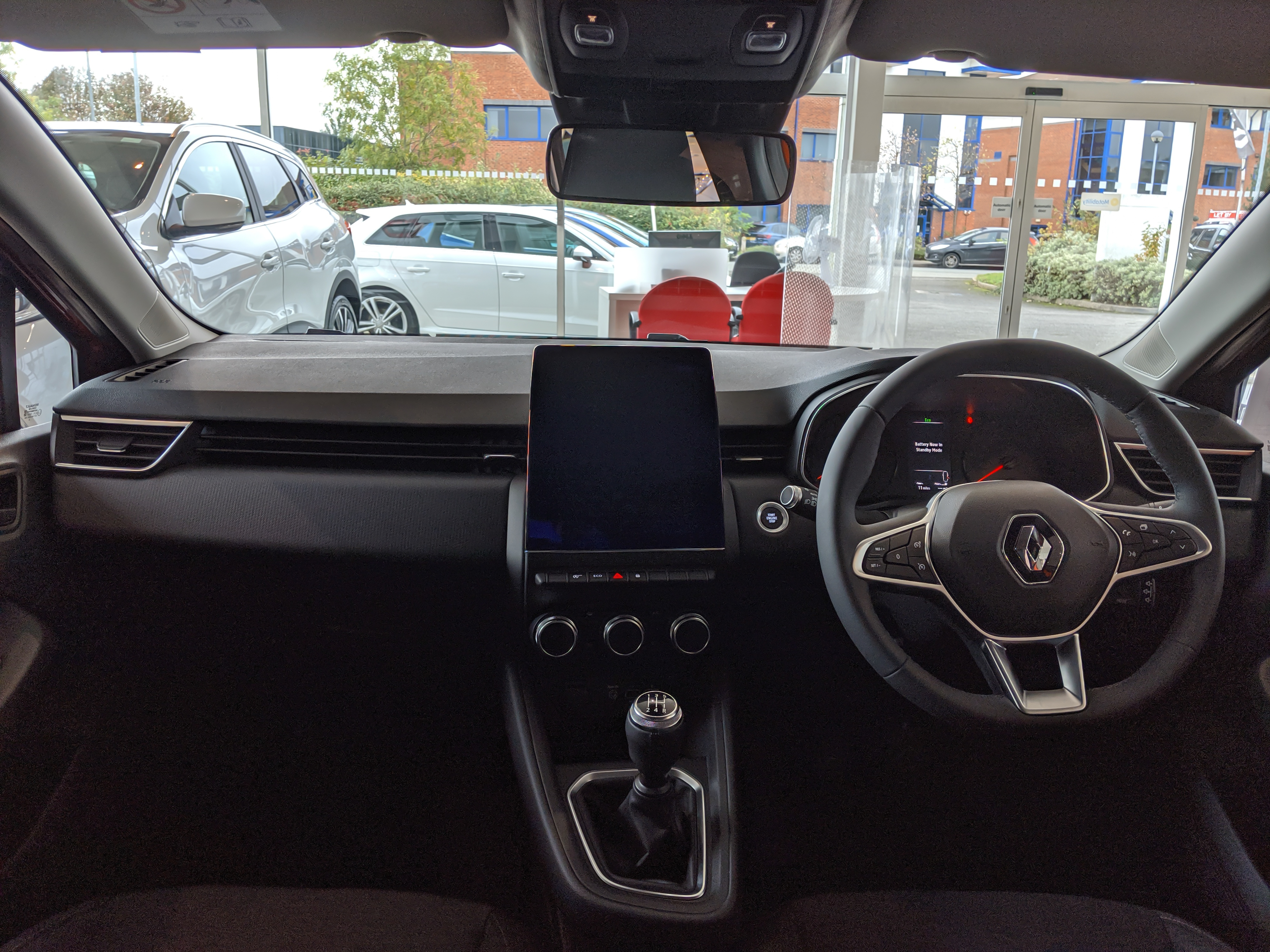
Interior (pre-facelift)

=== Facelift ===
On 18 April 2023, a significant facelift debuted, featuring a completely redesigned front bumper with slimmer headlights and a wider checkerboard grille. The R.S. Line trim level was replaced with the Esprit Alpine trim level.

In 2024, the Clio received an updated steering wheel with a new logo, taken from the Symbioz.

The Mitsubishi Colt was introduced on 8 June 2023, as a rebadged version of the facelifted Clio, and it features a hybrid powertrain option and a Petrol TcE 90 manual version. It is discontinued at the end of 2025, following the end of the production of the fifth-generation Renault Clio by Oyak-Renault, which was also manufacturing the Mitsubishi Colt.

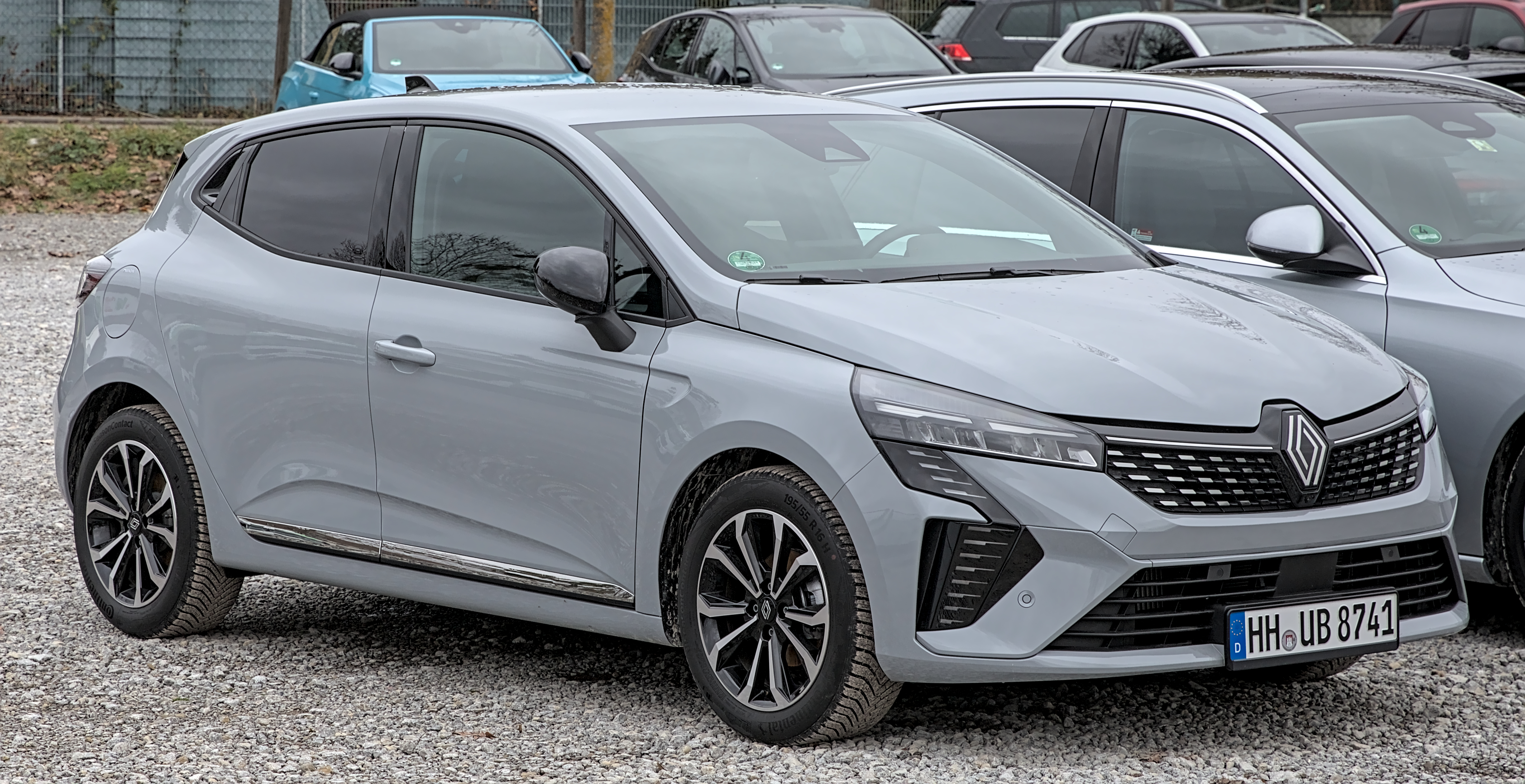
2023 Clio (facelift, front view)

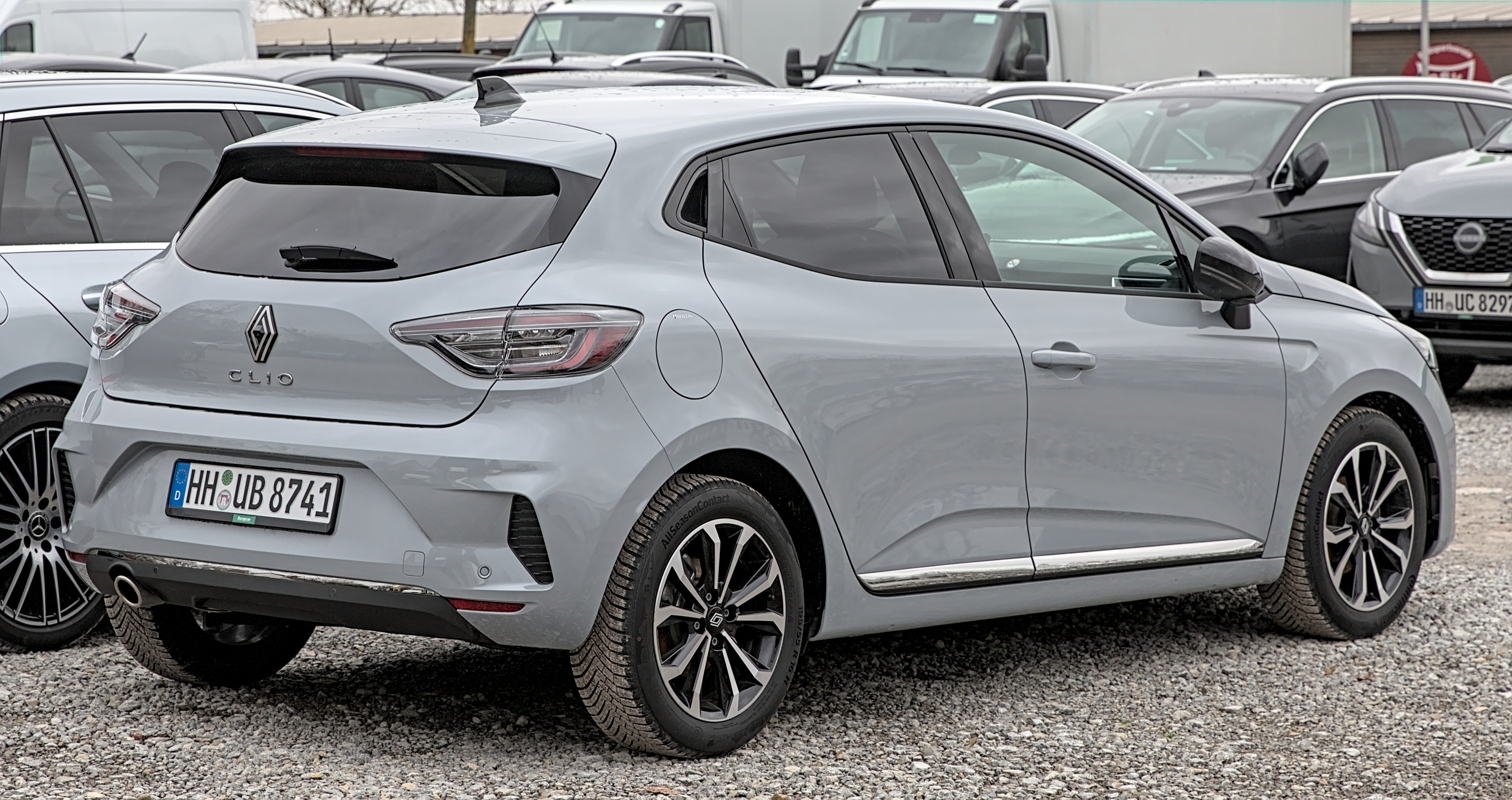
2023 Clio (facelift, rear view)

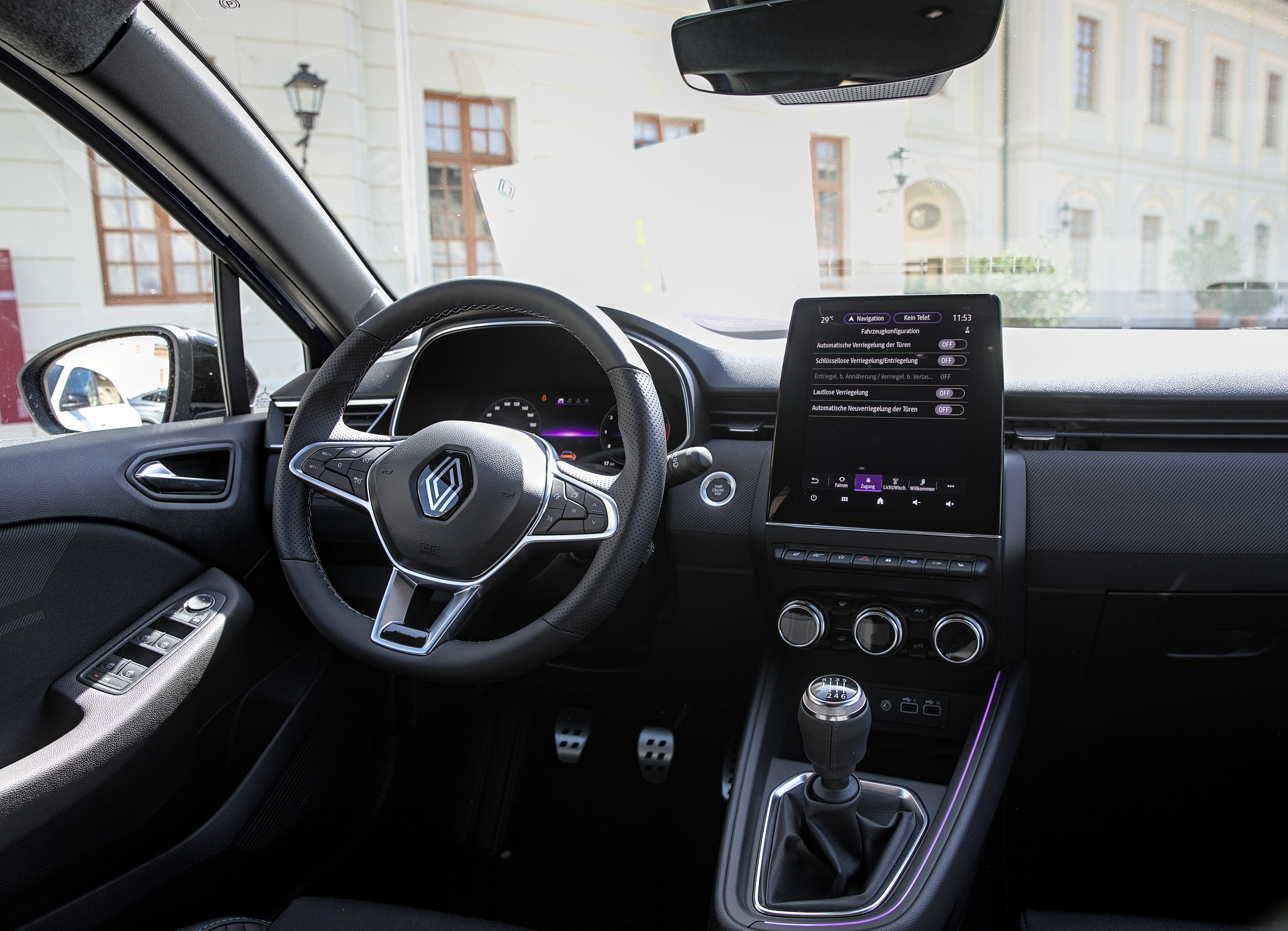
Interior (facelift)

=== Powertrain ===
The CMF-B modular platform enables improved efficiency and offers the option of a hybrid powertrain for the first time. Available from 2020, the E-Tech hybrid drivetrain combines a new generation 1.6-litre petrol engine with two electric motors, a multi-mode gearbox and a 1.2 kWh battery.

The range of conventional engines includes new turbo petrol engines (1.0 TCe 100 and 1.3 TCe 130), along with the naturally aspirated 1.0 SCe, as well as the 1.5-litre Blue dCi diesel with an output of 85 hp (63 kW). In total, customers can choose from nine engine/gearbox combinations.

Engine	Years	Code	Displacement	Power	Torque	Top speed	0–100 km/h	Combined consumption	CO_{2} emissions
Petrol engines
SCe 65	09/2019–08/2020	B4D	999 cc	48 kW (65 PS)	95 N⋅m	160 km/h	17.1 s	4.9–5.1 L/100 km	112–116 g/km
SCe 65	since 08/2020	B4D	999 cc	49 kW (67 PS)	95 N⋅m	160 km/h	17.1 s	4.9–5.1 L/100 km	112–116 g/km
SCe 75	09/2019–08/2020	B4D	999 cc	53 kW (72 PS)	95 N⋅m	162 km/h	16.4 s	5.0–5.1 L/100 km	112–116 g/km
TCe 90 (X-tronic)	since 08/2020	H5D	999 cc	67 kW (91 PS)	160 (142) N⋅m	180 km/h (175 km/h)	12.2 s (12.4 s)	4.9–5.1 L/100 km (5.0–5.2 L/100 km)	112–117 g/km (114–119 g/km)
TCe 100 (X-tronic)	04/2020–08/2020	H5D	999 cc	74 kW (101 PS)	160 (142) N⋅m	187 km/h (182 km/h)	11.8 s (11.5 s)	4.4–4.7 L/100 km (5.1–5.3 L/100 km)	100–107 g/km (116–120 g/km)
TCe 100 LPG	06/2019–08/2020	H5D	999 cc	74 kW (101 PS)	160 N⋅m	188 km/h	12.5 s	5.7–6.1 L/100 km	94–100 g/km
TCe 100 LPG	08/2020–01/2022	H5D	999 cc	74 kW (101 PS)	170 N⋅m	188 km/h	11.8 s	6.7–7.0 L/100 km	106–110 g/km
TCe 130	06/2019–12/2020	H5H	1332 cc	96 kW (130 PS)	240 N⋅m	200 km/h	9.0 s	5.2–5.5 L/100 km	119–126 g/km
TCe 140	04/2021–08/2023	H5H	1332 cc	103 kW (140 PS)	260 N⋅m	205 km/h	9.4 s	5.3–5.6 L/100 km	122–128 g/km
E-Tech 140 Hybrid	07/2020–01/2022	H4M	1598 cc	103 kW (140 PS)	144 N⋅m	180 km/h (up to 75–79 km/h purely electric)	9.9 s	3.6–4.0 L/100 km	82–91 g/km
E-Tech 145 Hybrid	since 01/2022	H4M	1598 cc	105 kW (143 PS)	148 N⋅m	175 km/h	9.3 s	3.6–4.0 L/100 km	83–90 g/km
Diesel engines
Blue dCi 85	06/2019–12/2020	K9K	1461 cc	63 kW (85 PS)	220 N⋅m	178 km/h	14.7 s	3.6–3.8 L/100 km	95–101 g/km
Blue dCi 115	06/2019–12/2020	K9K	1461 cc	85 kW (115 PS)	260 N⋅m	197 km/h	9.9 s	3.6–3.8 L/100 km	95–101 g/km
Blue dCi 100	since 07/2021	K9K	1461 cc	74 kW (100 PS)	260 N⋅m	188 km/h	11.4 s	3.6–3.8 L/100 km	95–101 g/km

=== Safety ===
Euro NCAP test results* Renault Clio Zen 1.0 TCe 100 (LHD) (2019)
Test	Points	%
Overall:	5 /5 stars	
Adult occupant:	36.5	96%
Child occupant:	43.7	89%
Pedestrian:	34.8	72%
Safety assist:	9.9	75%

== Sixth generation (X60; 2025) ==
Clio VI
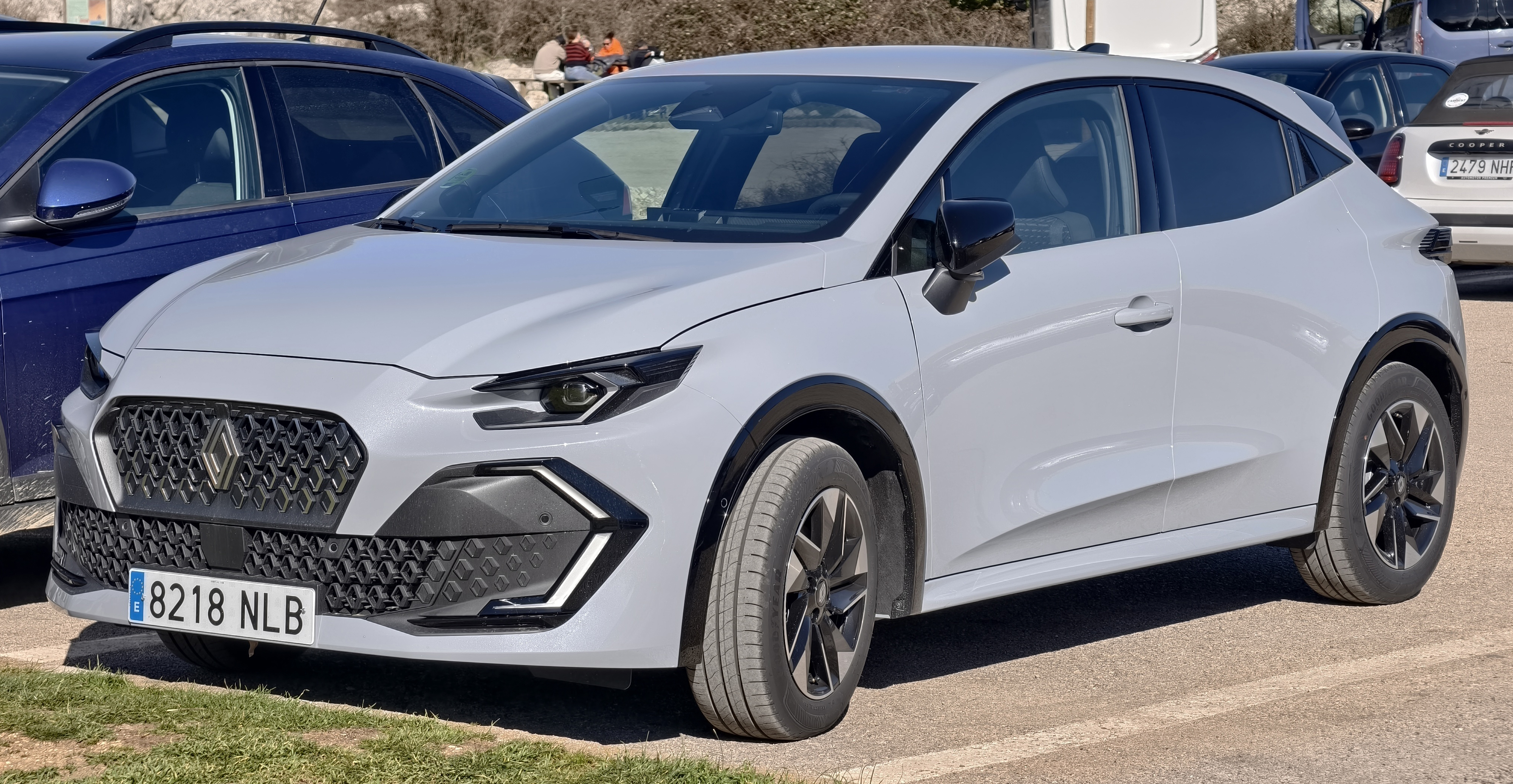
- 2026 Renault Clio Techno

Overview
- Model code: X60
- Production: 15 September 2025 – present
- Assembly: Turkey: Bursa (Oyak-Renault)

Body and chassis
- Body style: 5-door hatchback
- Platform: Renault–Nissan CMF-B HS platform
- Related: Renault Captur II; Mitsubishi ASX II; Renault Symbioz; Mitsubishi Grandis; Renault Arkana; Nissan Kicks (P16)

Powertrain
- Engine: Petrol: 1.2 L HR12 I3 turbo; Petrol hybrid: 1.8 L Horse HR18 HEV I4

Dimensions
- Wheelbase: 2,591 mm (102.0 in)
- Length: 4,116 mm (162.0 in)
- Width: 1,768 mm (69.6 in)
- Height: 1,451 mm (57.1 in)

The sixth-generation Clio debuted on 8 September 2025 at the 2025 Munich Motor Show.

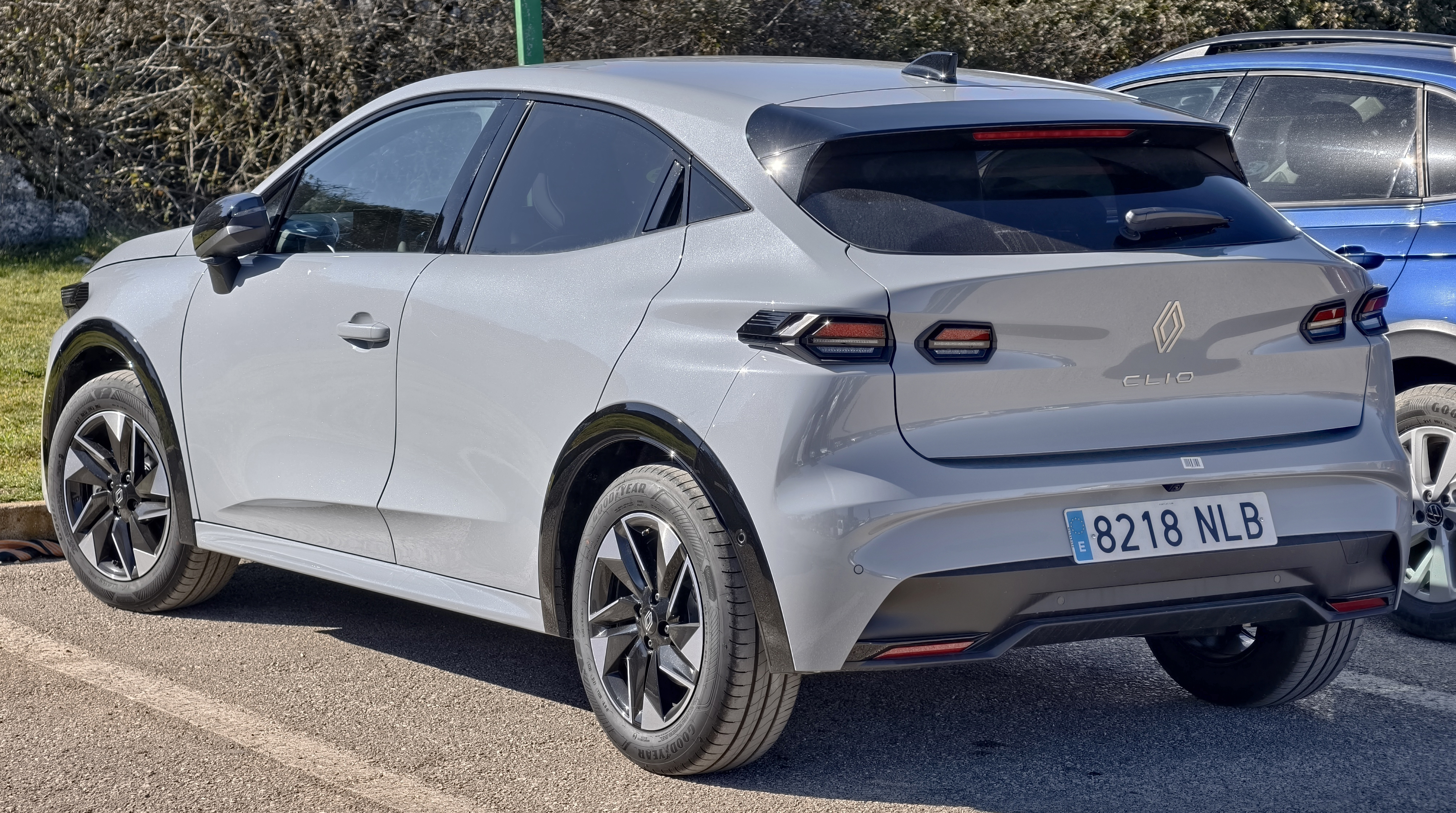
Rear view

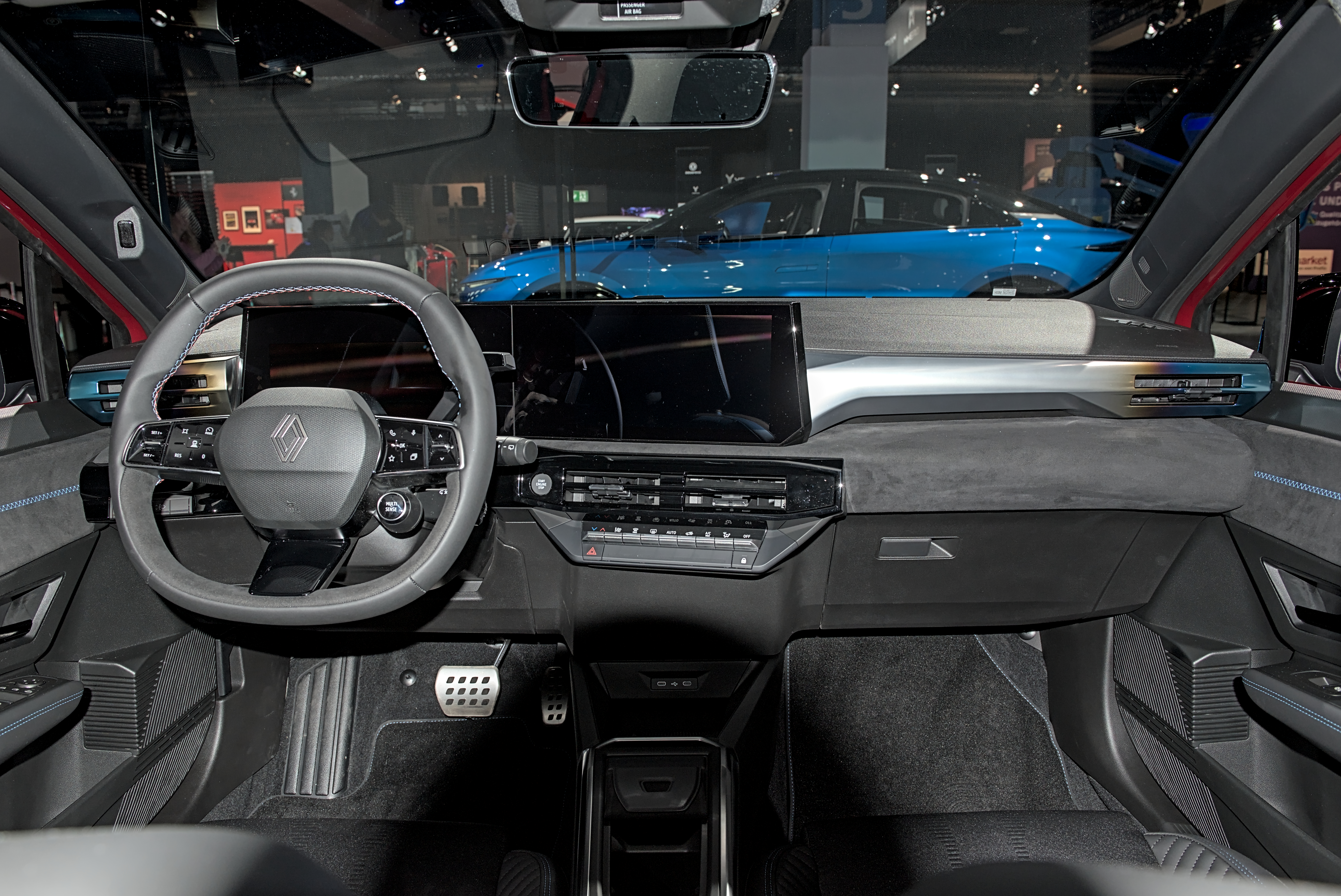
Interior

=== Safety ===
Euro NCAP test results Renault Clio 1.8 petrol hybrid (LHD) (2025)
Test	Points	%
Overall:	4 /5 stars	
Adult occupant:	31.8	79%
Child occupant:	40.6	82%
Pedestrian:	50.7	80%
Safety assist:	13.3	73%

In a frontal collision test conducted at 64 km/h, bending occurred in the A-pillar, and a side pole collision test conducted at 50 km/h showed that the vehicle has worse cabin protection than the previous generation.

== Advertising ==
- In the United Kingdom, the Clio was advertised on television using the characters "Nicole" (a flirtatious young French woman played by Estelle Skornik) and "Papa" (her somewhat slow-witted father played by Max Douchin). The 1994 advert featured Vincent Cassel as Nicole's boyfriend. The commercials were very popular, with the final instalment of the series featuring comedy double act Bob Mortimer and Vic Reeves, in a sequence parodying The Graduate. In 2000, the 1991 commercial "Interesting" was named the 12th best television commercial of all time, in a poll conducted by The Sunday Times and Channel 4. Sound clips of the advert were played repeatedly on The Chris Moyles Show when it was discovered Comedy Dave and his girlfriend had named their newborn daughter Nicole.
- In 1999, a television advert was launched worldwide for the Renault Clio MTV Limited edition featuring a man who was saying "Get up ah!" all the time, it was actually the only sound he can hear from a Clio passing in front of his house early in the morning, then the advert shows the five men inside the Clio and moving their heads to the rhythm of the James Brown song "Get Up (I Feel Like Being a) Sex Machine". Same advertising made in Argentina with the Clio II in 2000 with this song.
- The Clio II advertising campaign featured French model Hélène Mahieu, and French international footballer Thierry Henry for the Clio II facelift, both attempting to define the term va-va-voom, a term later defined by the Oxford English Dictionary as "The quality of being exciting, vigorous, or sexually attractive", although they state that it dates from the 1950s. In Brazil, the Clio had a trim level called Va Va Voom. The trim level has been discontinued. In Mexico, The Clio II's latest campaign reads "todo por mi Clio" (anything for my Clio), depicting one would give anything to keep one's Clio safe from danger.
- An advertising campaign in 2005 and 2006 for the Renault Clio III featured French actress Annelise Hesme and English actor Jeremy Sheffield as Sophie and Ben (respectively), trying to outdo each other over the superiority of each nation via a range of cultural aspects. This "France Vs Britain" (French car, British designers) campaign has been extended across a number of media, for example the "French Film, British Cinemas" tag for the annual Renault French Film Festival. The music used is Nina Simone's "Sinnerman".

== Motorsport ==
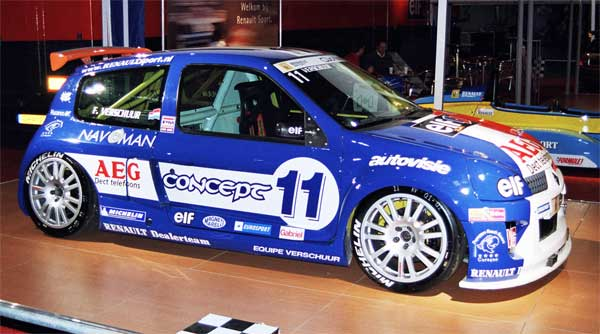

The Clio has competed in various well-known races and championships such as the Spa 24 hours and British GT. The car competed in the Spa 24 hour race in 1991, 1992, 1993, 1995, 1999 and 2000. Atlanta Motorsport competed in the GT Cup class in 2003 and 2004, both times at Donington Park. The Clio has also been entered in the Nürburgring 24 Hours and Zolder 24 Hours with varying amounts of success.

In 2001, Rob Collard entered the BTCC with a Renault Clio in the Production class, which were made up of slower, smaller cars like the Peugeot 306 GTi, the Ford Focus and Honda Accord. Throughout the season, Collard was a common contender in the middle of the field in most races. He was often seen amongst the lower-scoring Peugeot 306s like Tom Boardman and Paul O'Neill. At the end of the season, despite not participating in nine races and getting only eight finishes, initially, he finished 12th with 51 points, but due to a penalty of 5 points, his final position in the championship standings was 13th with 46 points. He scored one podium in the first race at Snetterton, with a 5th-place finish.

In 2002, Collard entered again with the Clio for the next season. Unfortunately, out of the ten races he was entered in, he only started four, with the three he finished resulted in him ending up on the podium with a 2nd place in class (7th overall) and a 1st place in class (9th overall) at the first event of the season. After four non-starts at Oulton Park and Thruxton, Collard finished 2nd in class (14th overall) at Silverstone in the first race, later retiring from the second. His last entry in the Clio was at Croft where he didn't start either race. By the end of the season, he initially had 39 points, but 5 were redacted, he remained in his 12th-place finish in the championship standings with 34 points.

=== Rallying ===
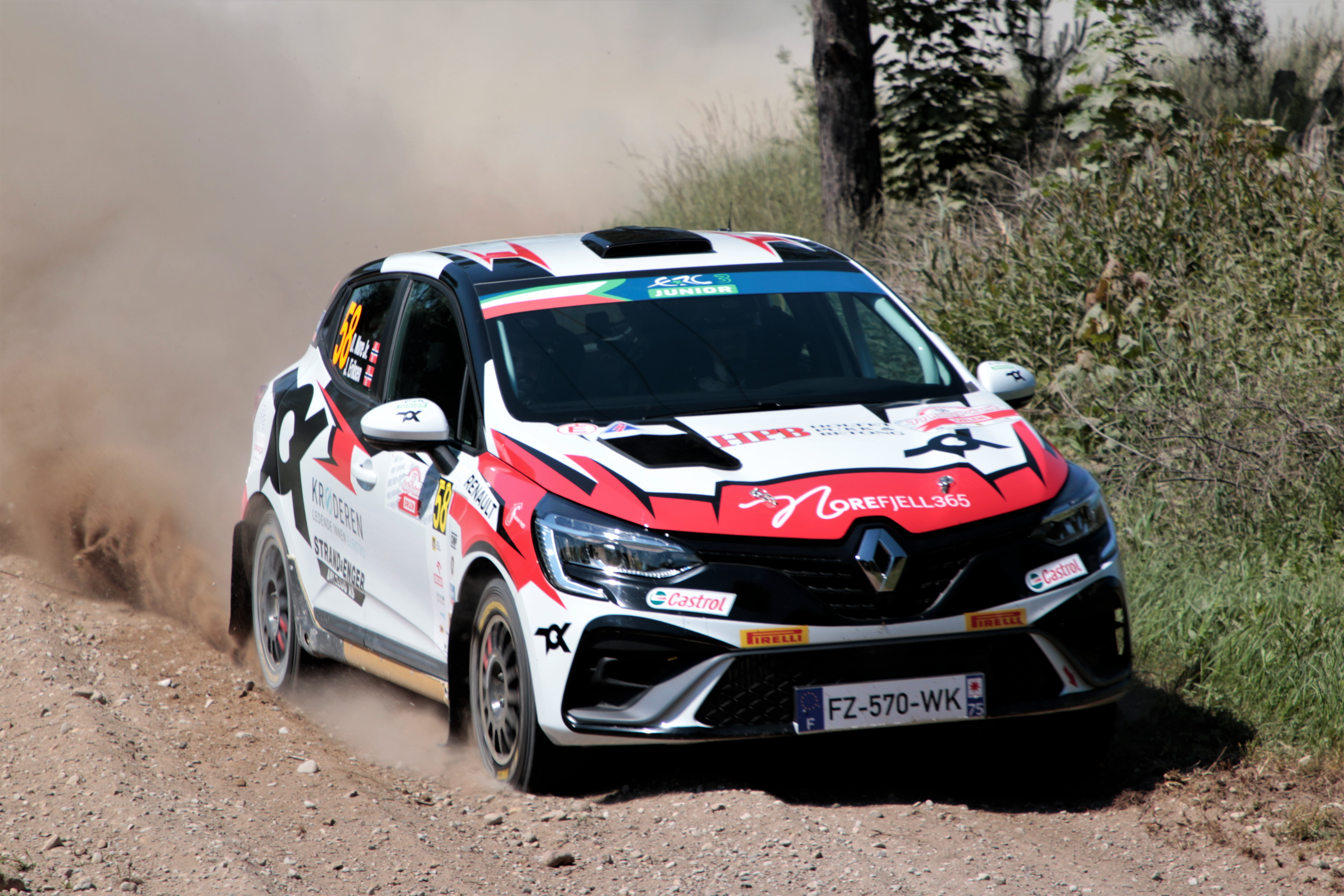
A Renault Clio Rally4 at the 2021 Polish Rally.

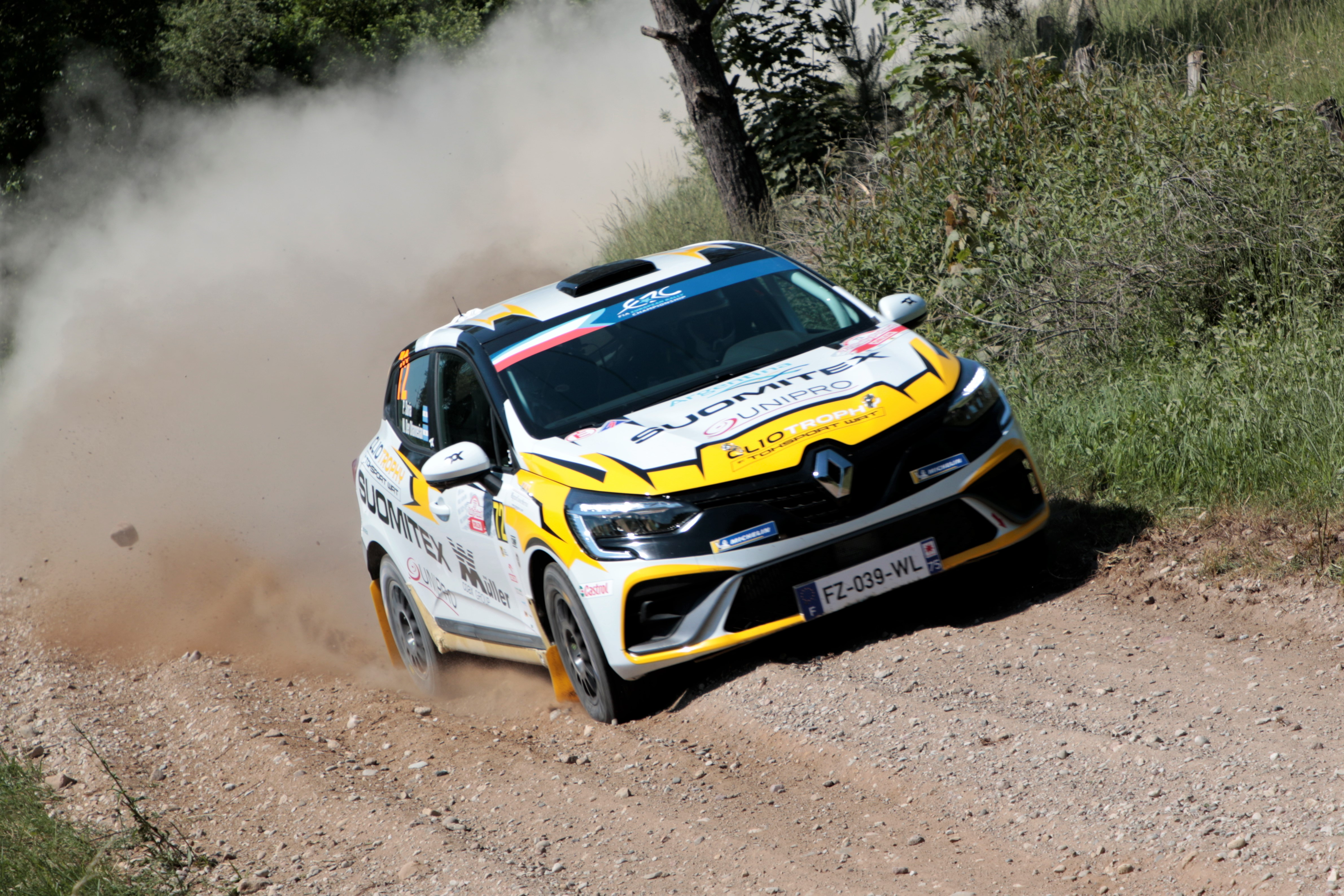
A Renault Clio Rally5 at the 2021 Polish Rally.

Versions of the mark-five Clio, the Renault Clio Rally4 and the Renault Clio Rally5, have been produced by Renault Sport for the Rally4 and Rally5 tiers of the Fédération Internationale de l'Automobile's Rally Pyramid. Both are 260 millimetres (10 in) wider than their consumer counterpart, which is 40 millimetres (1.6 in) taller than the rally versions. Both are two-wheel drive, and have a front-axle track of 1,500 millimetres (59 in). A rallycross variant also exists.

== Awards ==
- European Car of the Year in 1991
- European Car of the Year in 2006
- What Car? "Supermini of the Year" 2006
- Winner of El Mejor Automóvil Subcompacto (Best supermini) on Automóvil Panamericano magazine in 2002, 2003 and 2004 in Mexico

== Sales ==
Year	Brazil	Europe
2001	28,032	
2002	39,743	
2003	28,781	461,369
2004	22,588	433,375
2005	18,899	380,869
2006	19,880	431,817
2007	19,636	381,909
2008	11,007	335,951
2009	13,890	321,644
2010	30,064	348,405
2011	27,060	303,847
2012	16,546	246,672
2013	29,905	283,749
2014	20,301	299,623
2015	14,816	303,240
2016	10,869	310,944
2017	57	321,472
2018		328,860
2019		317,645
2020		248,602
2021		199,889
2022		140,631
