= Otomotiv Sanayii Dernegi =

Turkish trade group

Logo of the Automotive Manufacturers Association

The Automotive Manufacturers Association (Turkish: Otomotiv Sanayii Dernegi) is a Turkish industry trade group, which represents the Turkish automotive industry.

It was established as the "Association of the Manufacturers of Land Vehicles, Trucks, Pickup Trucks, Buses and Automobiles" on 14 June 1974, with eleven members. The association changed to the present name on 7 November 1979.

== Members of the Association ==
- Isuzu Turkey (Anadolu Isuzu Otomotiv Sanayi ve Ticaret A.Ş.)
- Ford Otosan (Ford Otomotiv Sanayi A.Ş.)
- Hattat(Hattat Tarım Makinaları Sanayi ve Ticaret A.Ş.)
- Honda Turkey (Honda Türkiye A.Ş.)
- Hyundai Turkey (Hyundai Assan Otomotiv Sanayi ve Ticaret A.Ş.)
- Karsan (Karsan Otomtiv Sanayi ve Ticaret A.Ş.)
- MAN Turkey (MAN Türkiye A.Ş.)
- Mercedes-Benz Turkey (Mercedes-Benz Türkiye A.Ş.)
- Otokar (Otokar Otomotiv ve Savunma Sanayi A.Ş.)
- Oyak-Renault (Oyak Renault Otomobil Fabrikalari A.Ş.)
- Renault Trucks (Renault Trucks Türkiye A.Ş.)
- TEMSA (TEMSA Global Sanayi ve Ticaret A.Ş.)
- Tofaş (Tofaş Türk Otomobil Fabrikasi A.Ş.)
- Toyota Turkey (Toyota Otomotiv Sanayi Türkiye A.Ş.)
- Türk Traktör (Türk Traktör ve Ziraat Makinalari A.Ş.)
