= Renault Symbol =

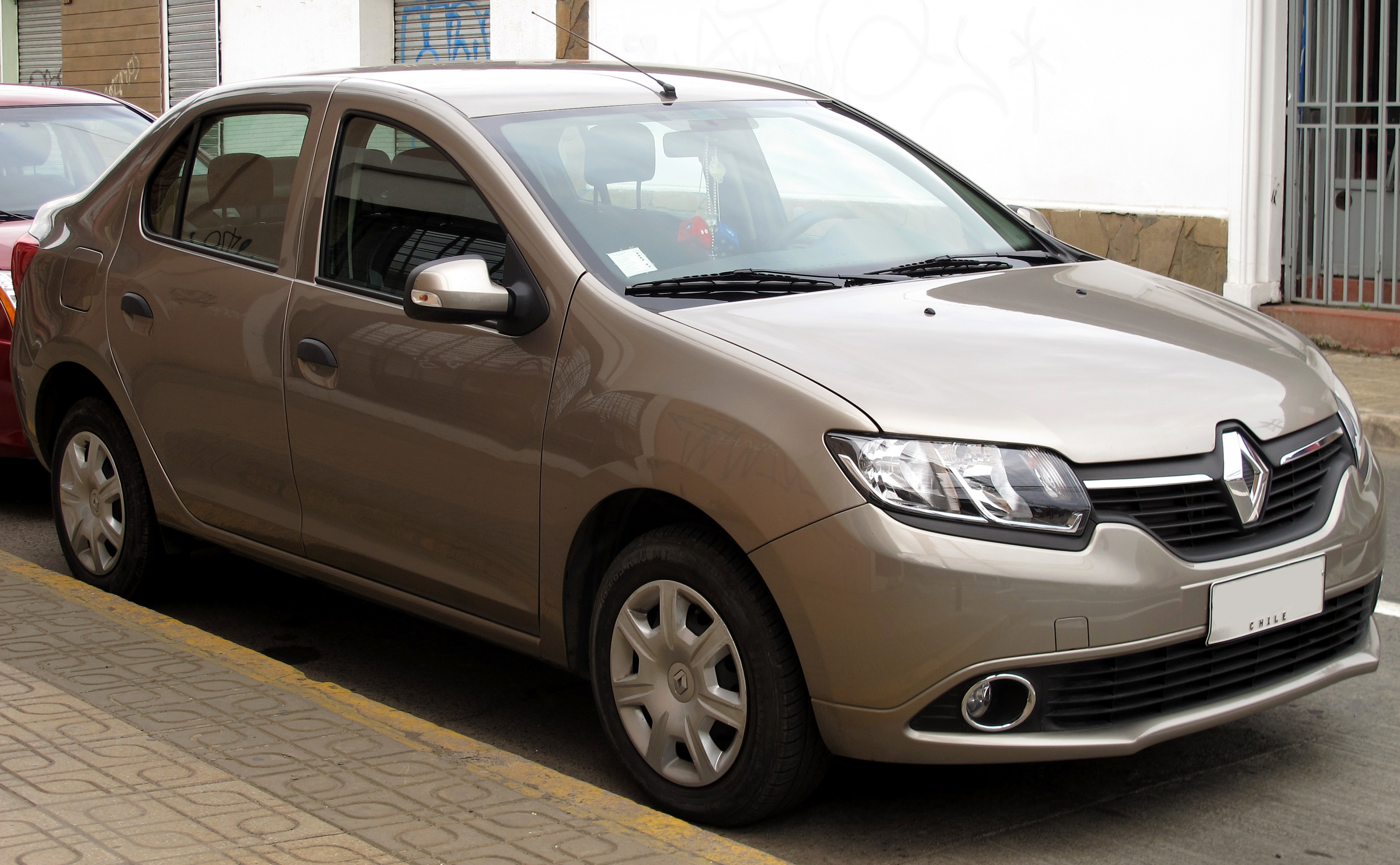

Overview
- Manufacturer: Renault
- Production: 1999–2021

Body and chassis
- Class: Subcompact car
- Body style: 4-door sedan
- Layout: Front-engine, front-wheel drive
- Related: Dacia Logan; Renault Clio

Chronology
- Successor: Renault Taliant; Renault Arkana (Mexico)

The Renault Symbol, Clio or Thalia in some markets, is a subcompact sedan produced by the French automobile manufacturer Renault. It was introduced in late 1999, under the Clio Symbol name, as the derivative version of the second generation Renault Clio, and unlike the hatchback it was marketed only in those countries where saloons were traditionally preferred over hatchbacks, while it was not sold in Western Europe. It was actually sold in France, but only in overseas departments/regions.

The second generation had a different design from the third generation Clio and was built on the platform of the first generation, which is in turn based on the second generation Clio. A third generation was introduced in late 2012, as a derivative version of the second generation Dacia Logan.

Its key markets are Central and Eastern Europe, Latin America, the Maghreb and the Persian Gulf states, most notably countries like Turkey, Brazil, Romania, Russia, Algeria, Colombia and Tunisia.

== First generation (Clio Symbol; 1999) ==
Clio Symbol
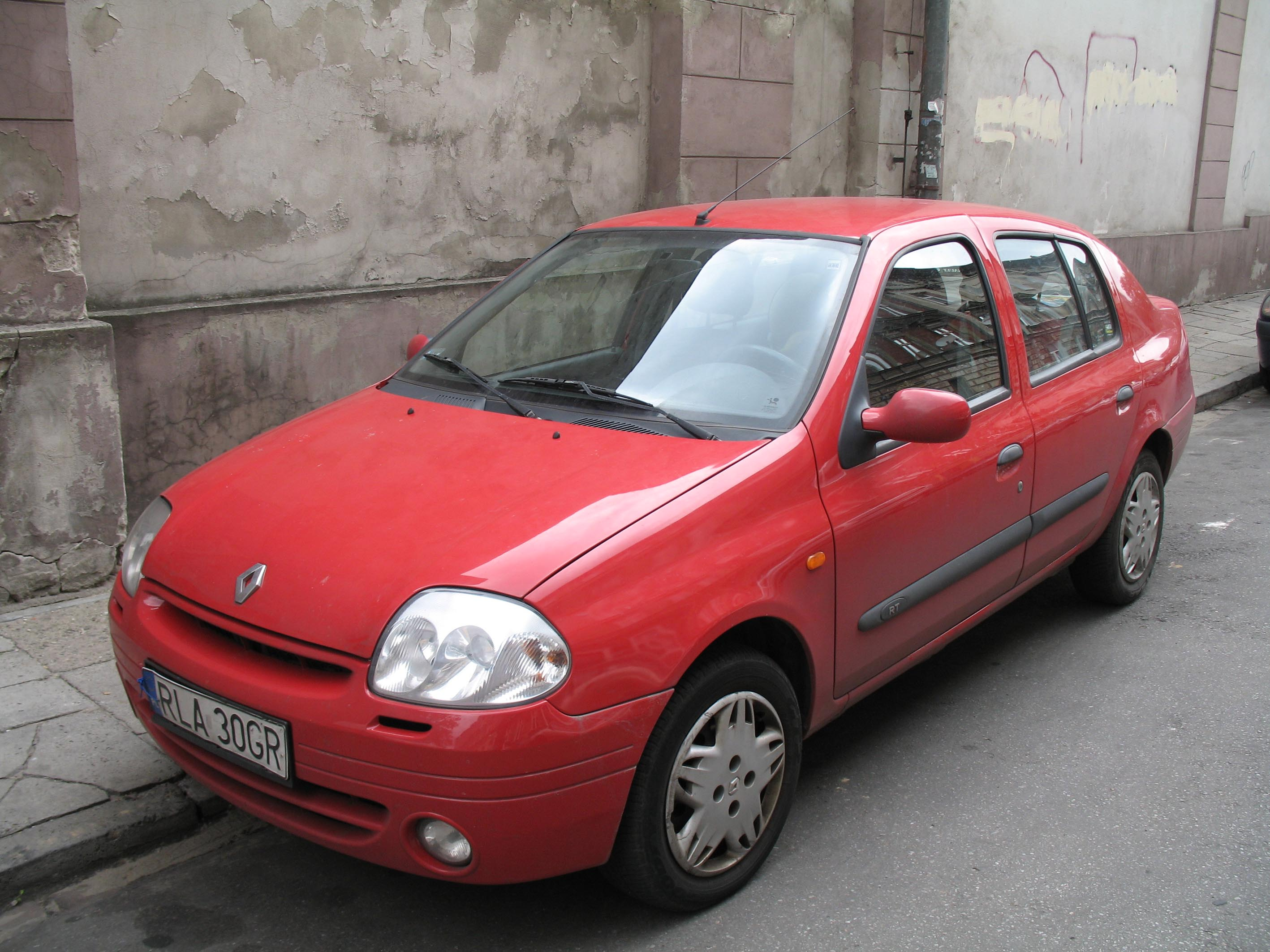

Overview
- Also called: Renault Clio Classic (North Africa and Middle East); Renault Clio 4 Puertas (Argentina, Uruguay, Chile); Renault Clio Sedan (Brazil, Paraguay); Renault Citius (Colombia, taxi version); Renault Thalia (Central and Southeastern Europe); Nissan Platina (Mexico)
- Production: 1999–2008 (Renault); 2002–2010 (Nissan)
- Assembly: Turkey: Bursa (Oyak-Renault); Brazil: São José dos Pinhais; Colombia: Envigado; Mexico: Aguascalientes

Body and chassis
- Body style: 4-door sedan
- Platform: Renault A Platform (X65)
- Related: Renault Clio II

Powertrain
- Engine: Petrol: 1.2 L D7F/D4F I4 8v/16v 1.4 L K7J/K4J I4 8v/16v 1.6 L K7M/K4M I4 16v Petrol flex-fuel: 1.0 L D7D/D4D I4 8v 1.6 L K7M/K4M I4 16v Diesel: 1.5 L K9K dCi I4 8v turbo 1.9 L F8Q d I4 8v 1.9 L F9Q dTi I4 8v
- Transmission: 5-speed manual 4-speed BVA

Dimensions
- Wheelbase: 2,473 mm (97.4 in)
- Length: 4,150 mm (163.4 in) (1999–02); 4,171 mm (164.2 in) (2002–08)
- Width: 1,639 mm (64.5 in)
- Height: 1,437 mm (56.6 in)
- Curb weight: 910–1,090 kg (2,010–2,400 lb)

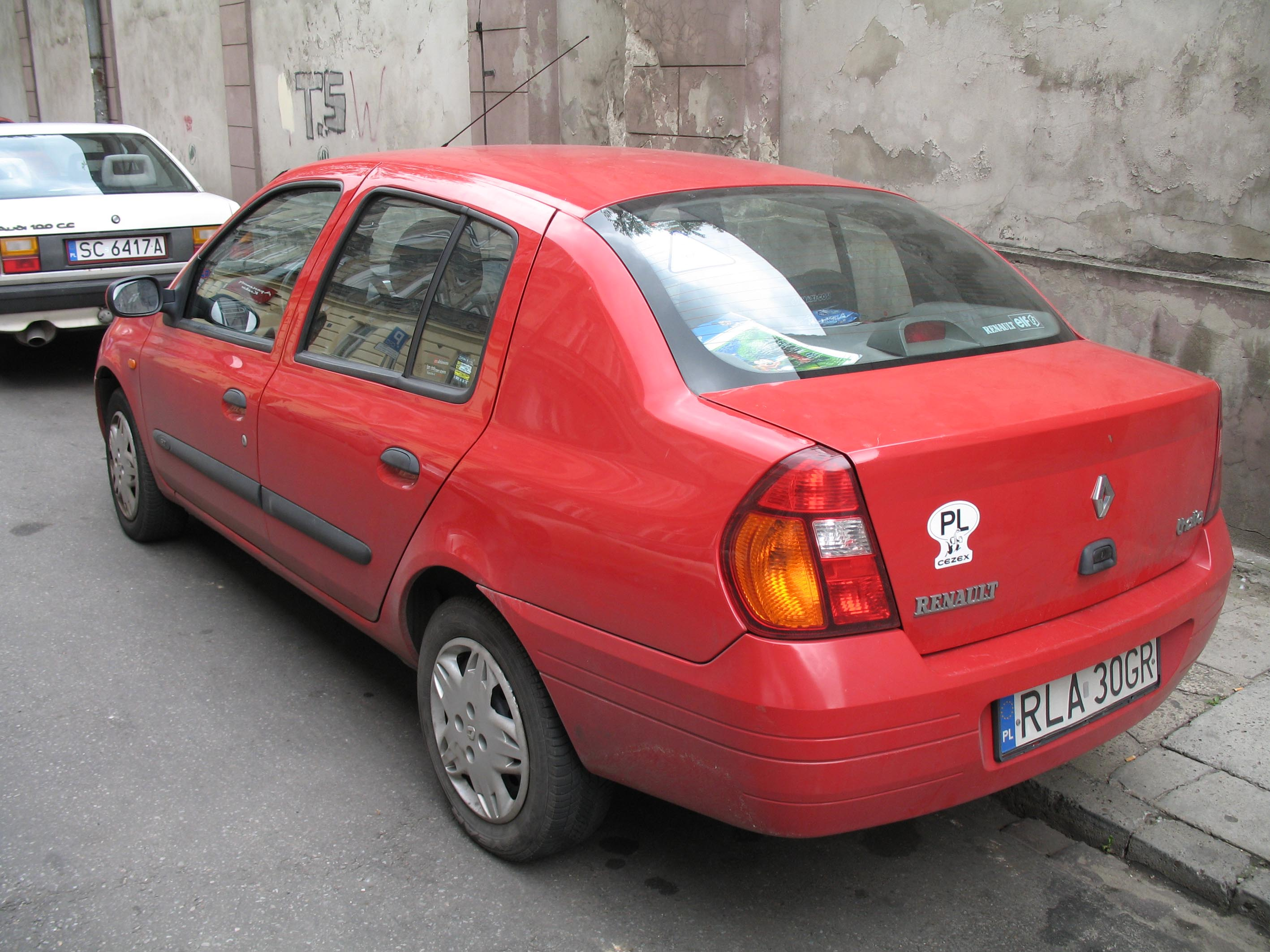
1999 Renault Thalia rear view

In late 1999, the Clio Symbol began production in Turkey, as the sedan version of the Clio II. It was subsequently launched in other countries, under different names, depending on the market: Clio Symbol, Thalia, Clio Sedan, Clio 4 Puertas, Symbol, or Clio Classic. The car was intended for sale in developing countries, where saloons were traditionally preferred over hatchbacks, most notably in Eastern Europe. In some Latin American markets, like Chile and Mexico, the facelifted model was offered as Nissan Platina, with slight changes at the front of the car to make it resemble the Nissan Altima. It is longer by 38 cm (15.0 in) than the hatchback and has a larger boot of 510 litres (18 cu ft).

The main production site of the model has been the Oyak-Renault plant in Bursa, Turkey, where manufacturing started in 1999 and sales in November of the same year. Worldwide, it was also built in Brazil at the Ayrton Senna complex in Sao José dos Pinhais, near Curitiba, since 2000, and since 2001 in Colombia by Sofasa. In 2002, it began assembly in Mexico, rebadged as Nissan Platina, at the Nissan Mexicana plant in Aguascalientes. For a short time, between the end of 2002 and 2004, it was also assembled in Russia by Avtoframos. The Platina was dropped following the 2010 model year, and was replaced by the March in its Mexican assembly plant and the line-up.

At the beginning it was available with only two engine options in Europe: a 1.4-litre, 8-valve (75 hp, 114 Nm) and a 1.4-litre, 16-valve (98 hp, 127 Nm), both of them with multi-point fuel injection. In Argentina it was manufactured with a 1.6-litre, 16-valve petrol (100 hp; 74 kW) engine and a 1.9-litre diesel (65 hp; non-turbo), in Colombia with the 1.4-litre, 8-valve, and in Brazil either with the 1.6-litre, 16-valve or with a 1.0-L, 16-valve petrol (70 hp; 52 kW). Initial trim designations were RN (RNA, RND) and RT (RTE, RTD), but later they received designated names: Authentique, Expression, Dynamique, Alizé, Privilège etc.

=== Facelifts ===
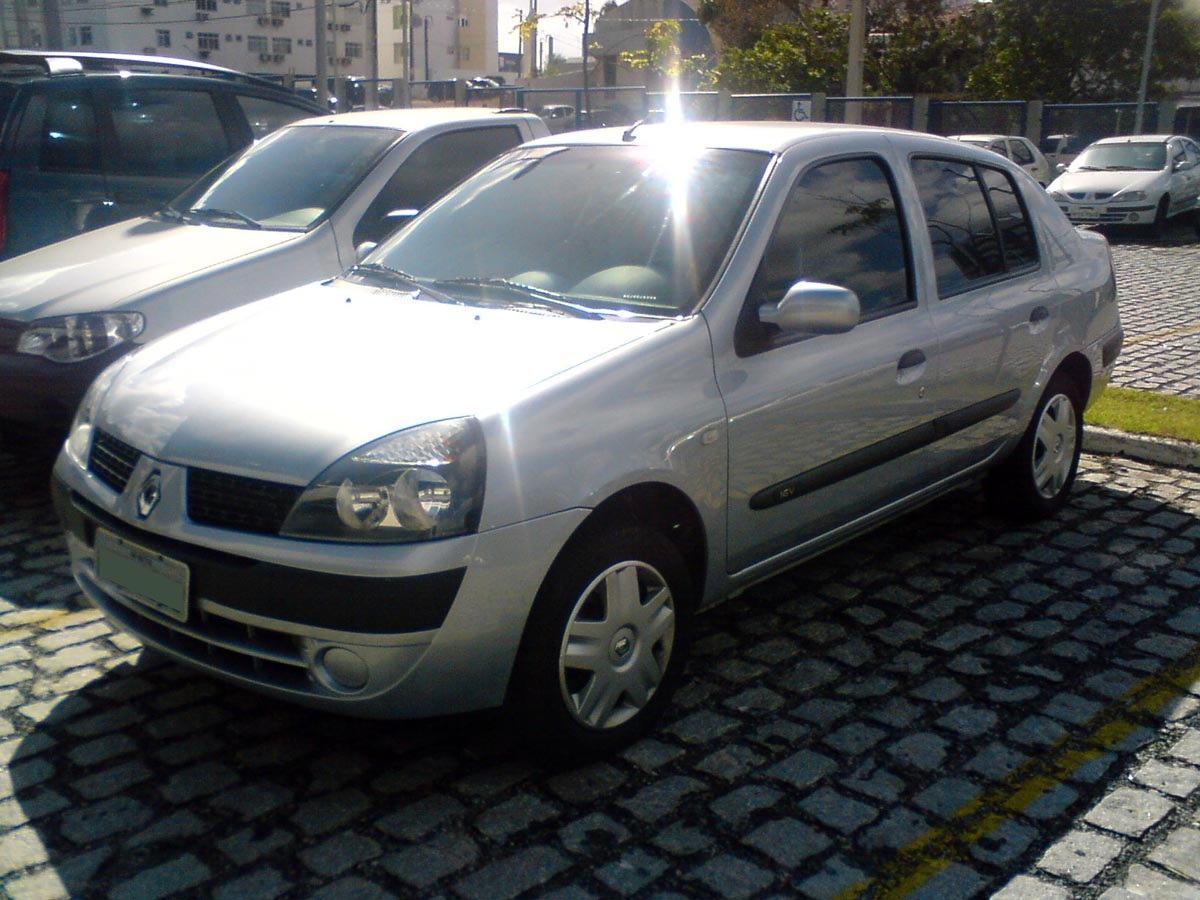
2002 Renault Symbol facelift

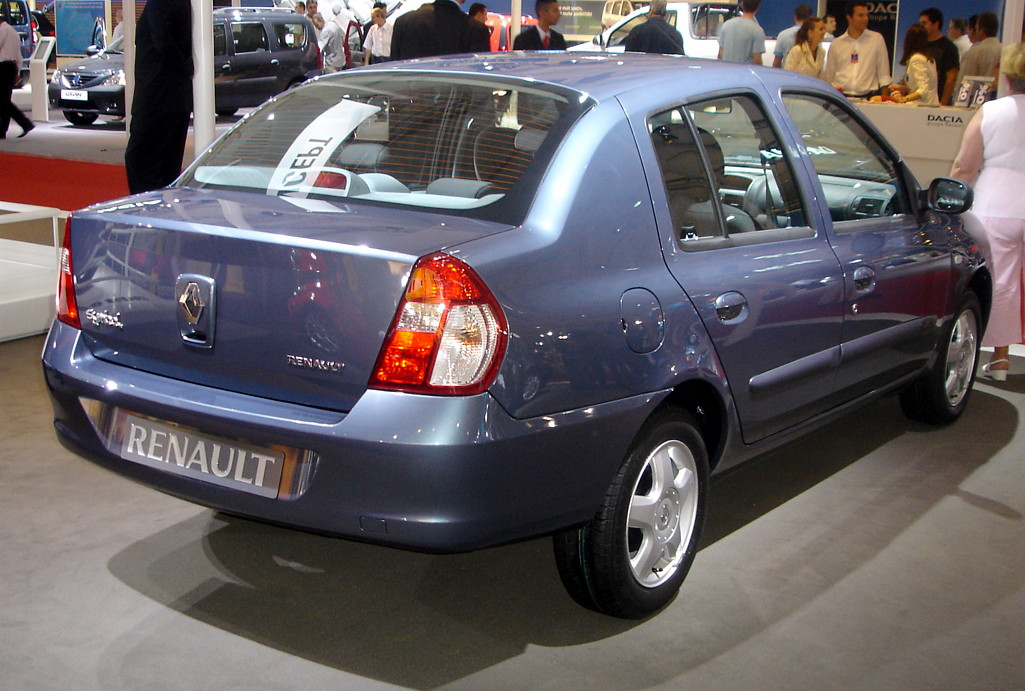
2007 Renault Symbol

It was facelifted in March 2002, gaining the new front end of the hatchback Clio, black moldings on the bumpers, slightly revised interior (electric window buttons moved from the central console onto the doors, the steering wheel got a new design) and improved safety levels. New engines were also added: a 1.5-litre diesel (65 hp, 160 Nm), and the 1.6-litre, 16-valve petrol (105 hp, 148 Nm) in Europe, which was only available with the Dynamique trim level. Throughout the following years, two other versions of the dCi engine were featured in the range: the 65 hp version was upgraded to 70 hp (following the introduction of the Euro IV emission standards from January 2005) and a more powerful version of 80 hp and 185 Nm (in the second half of 2004). A new 1.2-litre, 16-valve engine (75 hp, 105 Nm) was introduced the first half of 2006. An automatic transmission version was available, but only with the 1.4 16-valve petrol engine.

The new front end was adopted in South America from 2003. In Brazil two engines were adapted to run with flexible-fuel: the 1.0-litre, 16-valve (76 hp on petrol, 77 hp on alcohol) and the 1.6-litre 16-valve (110 hp on petrol, 115 hp on alcohol); while in Argentina a CNG version was introduced towards the end of the year. The interior of the pre-facelifted model was kept in the South American facelift version. In Colombia, automatic transmission was added in 2004 to the Symbol Expression, and the new interior of the facelift model was added in 2008, with some differences from the European version, including the location of the electric window controls, the seats and the radio, and it kept the exterior of the phase II Symbol. The Alizé model electric front windows and a driver's airbag; the Expression included electric mirrors, a digital clock, a passenger airbag, ABS and foglights. The 2008 model also included a 1.6-litre petrol engine, replacing the 1.4-litre one.

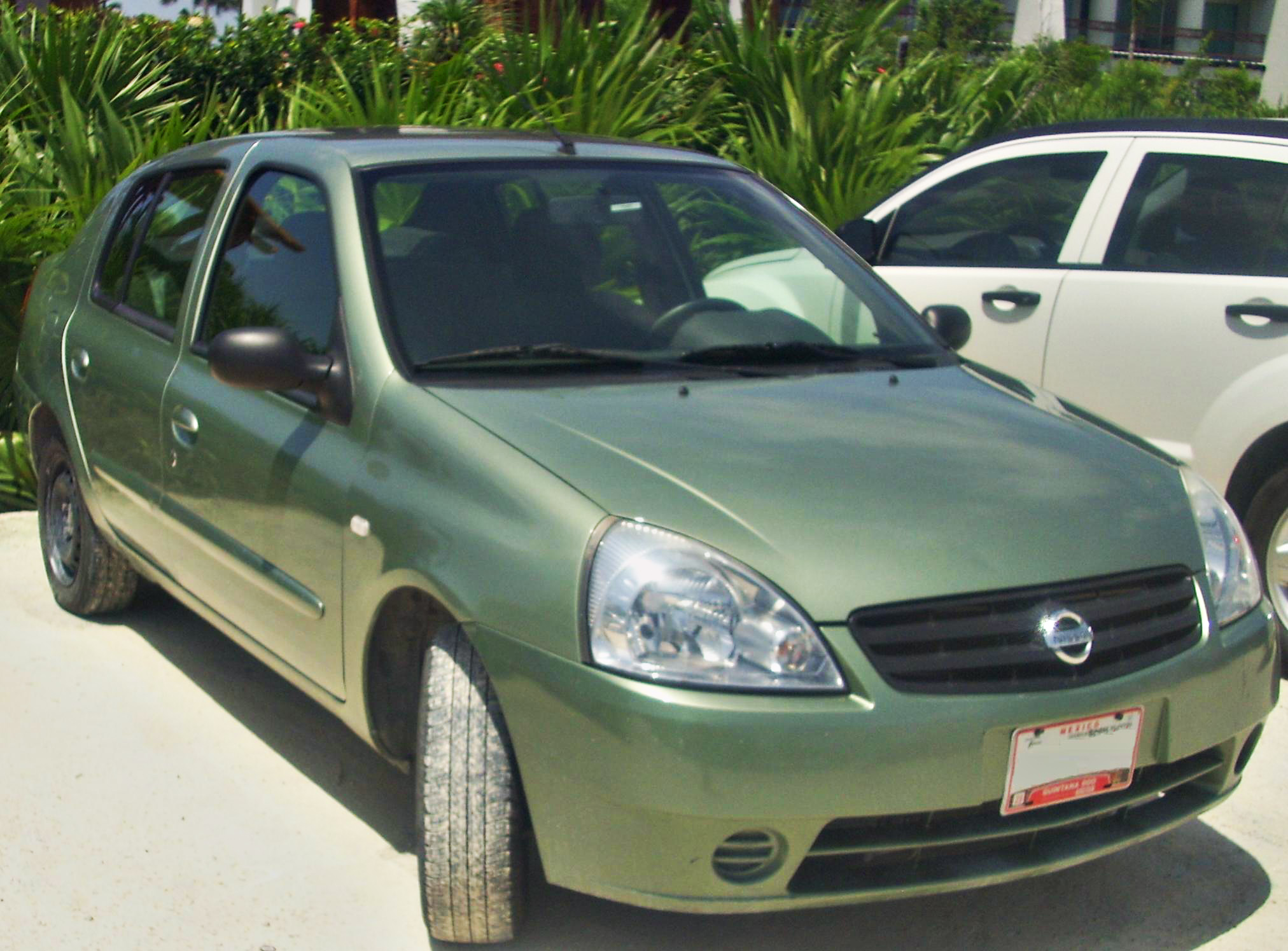
Nissan Platina (Mexico)

The Nissan Platina was available only with the 1.6-litre 16-valve petrol engine (110 hp; 82 kW). It had four trim levels, named Grado Q, Grado K, Grado K plus and Grado A, the same as the top cards in a playing deck. From the 2008 model year, they changed to Custom, Emotion, Premium and Premium A. It was sold either with a manual gearbox or with an automatic one with an overdrive system.

In the first half of 2005, minor changes were made to the models. These included clear tail light lenses and side repeaters, a slightly modified grille and some of the display units changing from analogue to digital.

In the beginning of 2006, an improved version of the sedan was offered in Argentina and Brazil, and from Autumn in Europe. The exterior now had body-coloured bumpers, without mouldings, regardless of the trim level. The shape of the grille was revised and the boot got a new handle with the Renault logo integrated, similar to the one used on the Laguna, as well as the new styling of the Renault nameplate. Four new colours were made available and two distinctive new rim designs. For the European model and the Platina, the interior was upgraded to the one used in the facelifted Clio II, with very minor parts commonality with Mégane II, as well as new standard and optional equipment, such as automatic air conditioning and a CD player.

This model was offered in three equipment levels: Authentique, Expression and Dynamique. Expression included driver airbag, air conditioning, trip computer, electric mirrors, electric front windows, CD-player and height-adjustable steering wheel. Dynamique added passenger airbag, ABS, electric rear windows, body-coloured door handles and alloy rims, although the ABS and passenger airbag were options that could be added to lower levels too. Automatic air conditioning was available as an extra feature.

It scored 12 points out of 16 in a frontal crash test conducted by the Russian magazine Autoreview in 2002, which was considered equivalent to the result scored by the hatchback version in the Euro NCAP testing. Over 600,000 units were sold worldwide since the release of this model.

=== Marketing ===
Renault quietly stopped sales of Thalia in Croatia during 2005 in favour of the Dacia Logan and from early 2006, it has no longer been present on their websites.

== Second generation (2008) ==
Symbol II
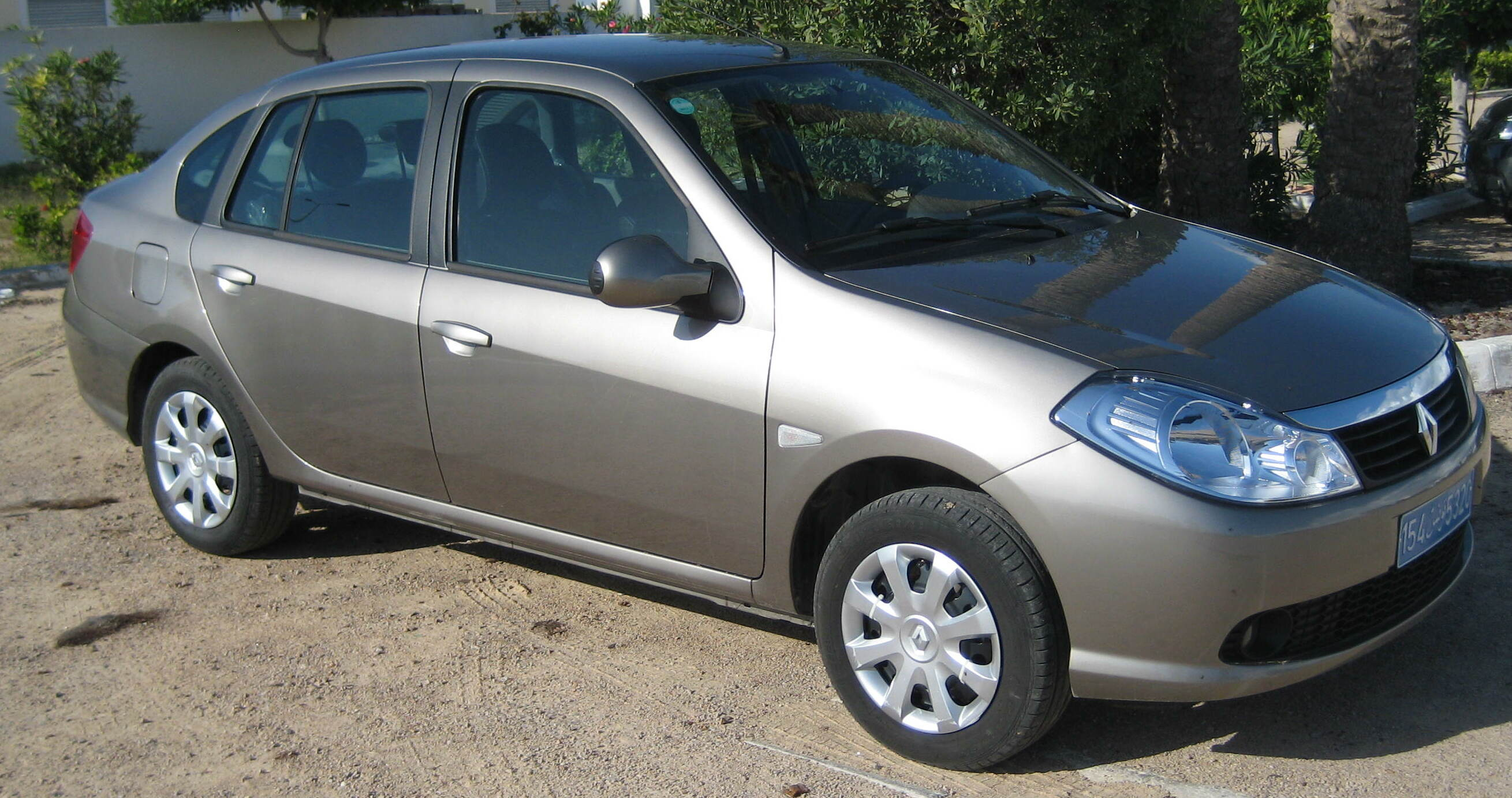

Overview
- Model code: L35
- Also called: Renault Thalia
- Production: 2008–2012 (Turkey); 2008–2013 (Argentina); 2009–2013 (Colombia)
- Assembly: Turkey: Bursa (Oyak-Renault); Argentina: Santa Isabel; Colombia: Envigado

Body and chassis
- Body style: 4-door sedan
- Platform: Renault A Platform (X65)
- Related: Renault Clio II

Powertrain
- Engine: Petrol: 1.2 L D4F/D4FT I4 8v/16v 1.4 L K4J I4 8v 1.6 L K4M I4 16v Petrol flex-fuel: 1.6 L K4M I4 16v Diesel: 1.5 L K9K dCi I4 8v turbo
- Transmission: 5-speed manual 4-speed BVA

Dimensions
- Wheelbase: 2,473 mm (97.4 in)
- Length: 4,261 mm (167.8 in)
- Width: 1,639 mm (64.5 in)
- Height: 1,439 mm (56.7 in)
- Curb weight: 904–1,045 kg (1,993–2,304 lb)

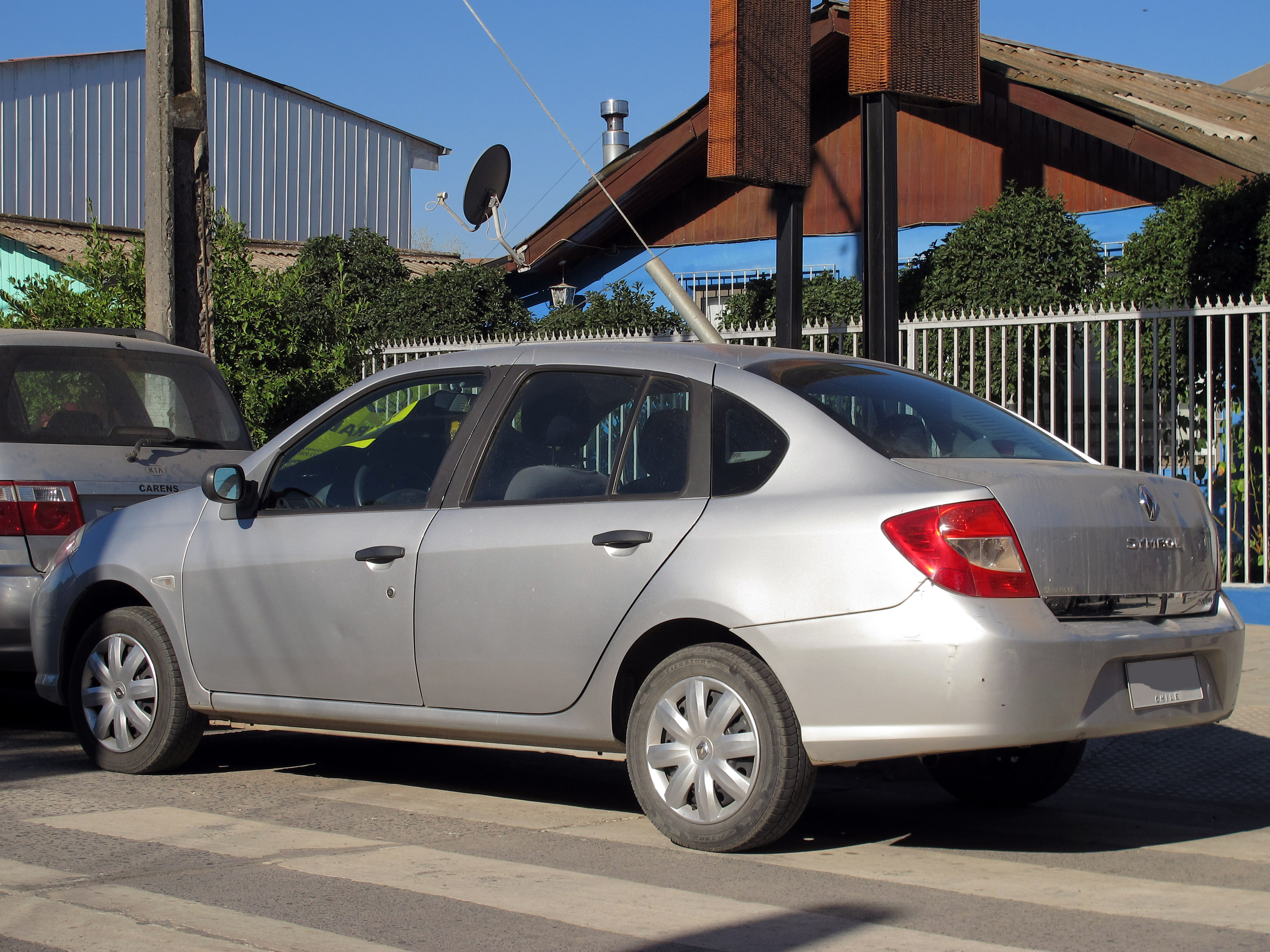
2008 Renault Symbol rear view

The second generation uses the running gear of the previous generation car and has a different design than the third generation Clio. The name Clio was dropped in favour to just Symbol, or Thalia in those markets where this name was used on the previous generation.

It was revealed for the first time in August 2008 at the Moscow International Motor Show, production started the same month, and it went on sale between September and November. The second generation car is longer than the previous by 7 cm (2.8 in) and has a boot capacity of 506 litres (17.9 cu ft).

The new Symbol was designed jointly by Renault's engineering teams in France, Turkey and Romania, for countries in the Eastern and Central Europe, Russia, Turkey, North Africa and as well the Persian Gulf States. Development of the project (codenamed L35) took 26 months. The main production site remains the Oyak-Renault plant in Bursa, Turkey, and from 2009 it was also manufactured in the Santa Isabel factory in Córdoba, Argentina, for the South American market and only with the 1.6-litre, 16-valve engine.

It is available in three equipment levels: Authentique, Expression and Privilège. Features included by Authentique are driver airbag, rev-counter or body-coloured front and rear bumpers. Expression adds hydraulic power steering, trip computer, electric front windows, height adjustable steering wheel and front seats, folding rear bench seat, rear headrests and body-coloured mirrors and electric central locking with remote control. Privilège adds electric mirrors, leather-trimmed steering wheel, foglamps, rear electric windows and radio-CD player with MP3 playback.

In terms of safety, the new Symbol offers driver airbag, passenger airbag, two lateral airbags (depending on version), anti-lock braking system (ABS) and electronic brakeforce distribution (EBD), anti-intrusion strengthening in front and rear doors, height-adjustable front seatbelts, power steering and rear parking sensors.

In December 2008, the second generation of the Renault Symbol was awarded the "Autobest 2009" prize, by a jury made up of journalists from fifteen countries, mainly emerging markets in Eastern and Central Europe.

This model unusually did not receive a facelift, as it was replaced by the Dacia Logan-based Symbol in 2013.

The Turkish police forces used to have second and third generation Renault Symbol cars before switching to Hyundai Tucsons, Renault Méganes, Nissan Qashqais or Toyota Corollas.

=== Engines ===
According to Renault, the engines used on this model are of the latest generation at the date of release.

Engine	Code	Type	Power	Torque	Top speed	0–100 km/h (0-62 mph)	Consumption	CO_{2} emissions
1.2 L (1149 cc)	D4F 728	16-valve I4	75 PS (55 kW; 74 hp)	105 N⋅m (77 lb⋅ft; 11 m⋅kgf)	167 km/h (104 mph)	13.0 s	5.9 L/100 km	140 g/km
1.4 L (1390 cc)	K7J 700	8-valve I4	75 PS (55 kW; 74 hp)	114 N⋅m (84 lb⋅ft; 12 m⋅kgf)	170 km/h (106 mph)	12.5 s	7.1 L/100 km	168 g/km
1.4 L (1390 cc)	K4J 712	16-valve I4	98 PS (72 kW; 97 hp)	127 N⋅m (94 lb⋅ft; 13 m⋅kgf)	185 km/h (115 mph)	11.5 s	7.0 L/100 km	165 g/km
1.4 L (1390 cc)	K4J 713	16-valve I4	98 PS (72 kW; 97 hp)	127 N⋅m (94 lb⋅ft; 13 m⋅kgf)	180 km/h (112 mph)	13.9 s	7.3 L/100 km	174 g/km
1.5 L (1461 cc)	K9K 700	8-valve dCi I4	64 PS (47 kW; 63 hp)	160 N⋅m (118 lb⋅ft; 16 m⋅kgf)	160 km/h (99 mph)	15.2 s	4.7 L/100 km	126 g/km
1.5 L (1461 cc)	K9K 740	8-valve dCi I4	65 PS (48 kW; 64 hp)	160 N⋅m (118 lb⋅ft; 16 m⋅kgf)	160 km/h (99 mph)	16.5 s	4.5 L/100 km	118 g/km
1.5 L (1461 cc)	K9K 718	8-valve dCi I4	84 PS (62 kW; 83 hp)	200 N⋅m (148 lb⋅ft; 20 m⋅kgf)	177 km/h (110 mph)	12.3 s	4.3 L/100 km	116 g/km
1.6 L (1598 cc)	K7M Hi-Flex	8-valve I4	95 PS (70 kW; 94 hp)	138 N⋅m (102 lb⋅ft; 14 m⋅kgf)	174 km/h (108 mph)	11.5 s		
1.6 L (1598 cc)	K4M 745	16-valve I4	105 PS (77 kW; 104 hp)	148 N⋅m (109 lb⋅ft; 15 m⋅kgf)	185 km/h (115 mph)	11.9 s	7.6 L/100 km	180 g/km
1.6 L (1598 cc)	K4M Hi-Flex	16-valve I4	115 PS (85 kW; 113 hp)	157 N⋅m (116 lb⋅ft; 16 m⋅kgf)				

== Third generation (2013) ==
Symbol III
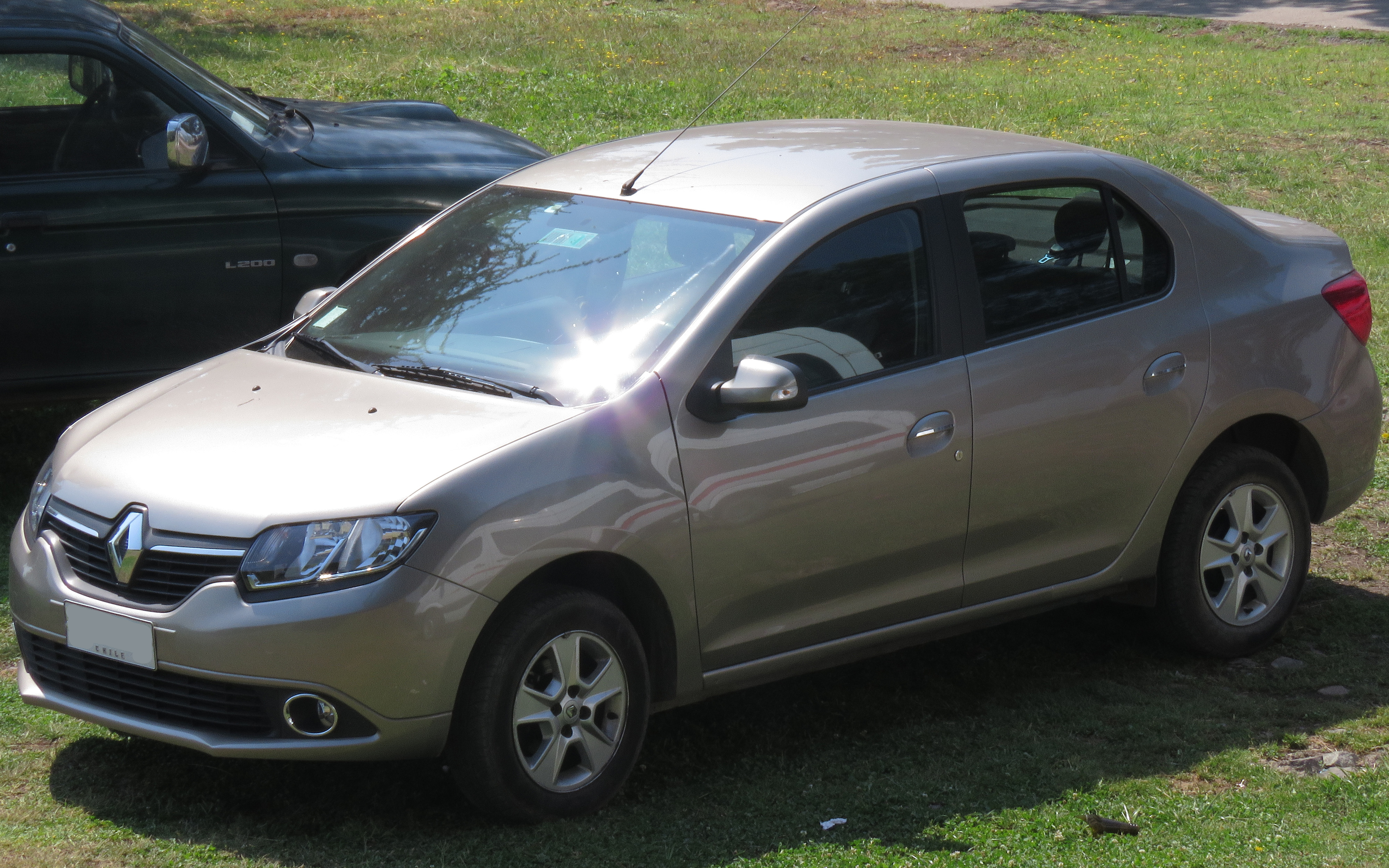

Overview
- Also called: Dacia Logan; Renault Logan
- Production: 2013–2021
- Assembly: Bursa, Turkey (Oyak-Renault); Oran, Algeria
- Designer: Renault Design Central Europe

Body and chassis
- Body style: 4-door saloon
- Platform: Dacia M0 platform
- Related: Dacia/Renault Sandero II

Powertrain
- Engine: Petrol: 0.9L TCe "M281" turbo I3; 1.0 L TCe M281 I3 turbo 1.0 L SCe I3; 1.0 L TCe I3 turbo 1.2 L D4F I4; 1.6 L SCe H4M I4; Diesel: 1.5 L dCi K9K I4
- Transmission: 5-speed manual 5-speed automated manual

Dimensions
- Wheelbase: 2,634 mm (103.7 in)
- Length: 4,346 mm (171.1 in)
- Width: 1,733 mm (68.2 in)
- Height: 1,517 mm (59.7 in)
- Curb weight: 1,049–1,268 kg (2,313–2,795 lb)

Chronology
- Successor: Renault Taliant

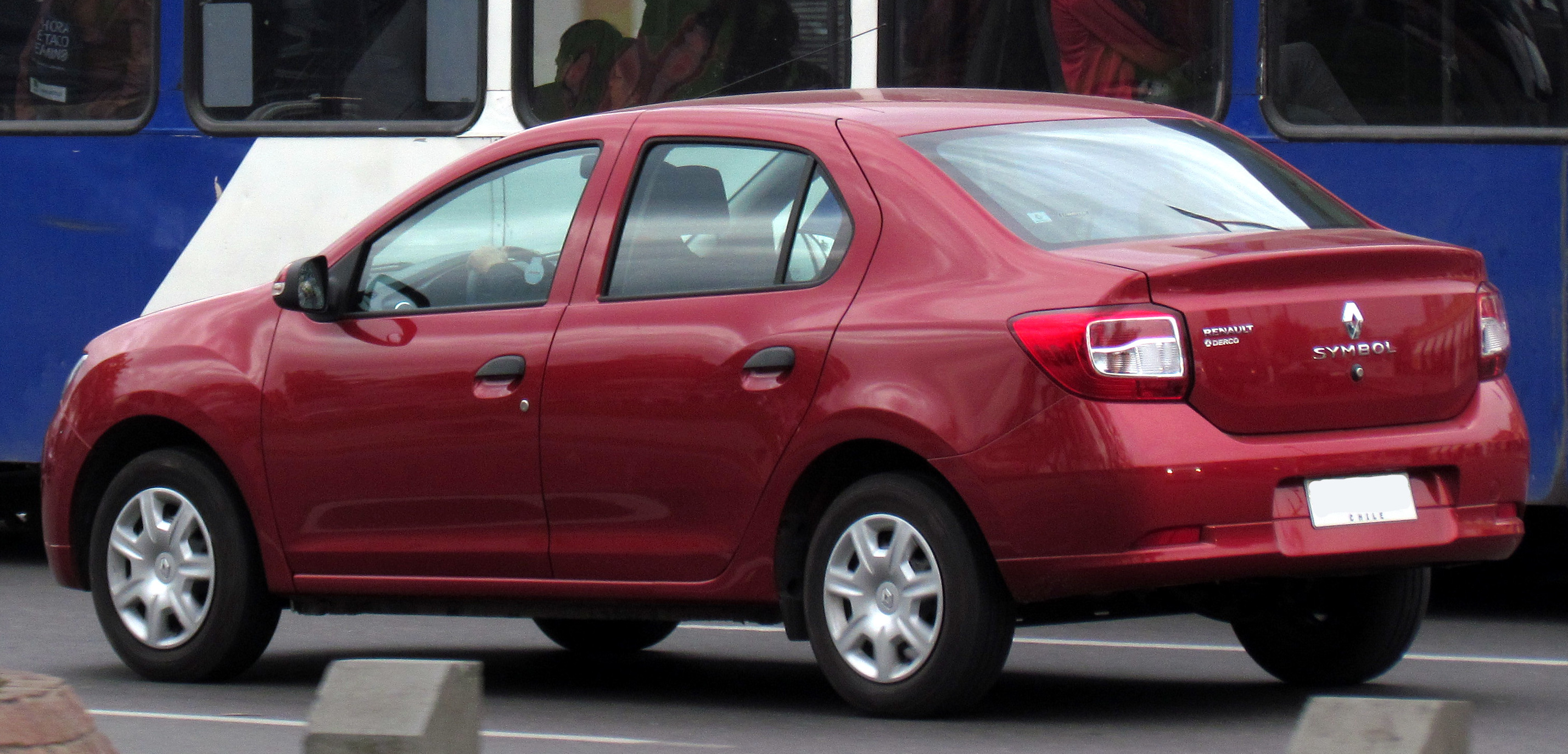
Rear view (Chile, pre-facelift)

The third generation was revealed at the 2012 Istanbul Motor Show, and it is a rebadged version of the second generation Dacia/Renault Logan. It is manufactured in Bursa, Turkey, and went sale on the Turkish market at the beginning of 2013, also being released in Algeria and Tunisia.

It is also manufactured and sold in Brazil since November 2013, as the Renault Logan. In Chile it is marketed as the Renault Symbol.

In November 2014, the Renault Symbol began assembly from CKD kits in a new plant in Oran, Algeria. Its production capacity is 25,000 units per year, which may eventually be increased to 75,000 vehicles per year.

The model produced for South America (where it is marketed mainly as the Renault Logan) and Turkey and Algeria retains small design differences, both at the exterior and the interior. The interior differs mainly at the central part of the dashboard, whereas the exterior has a different front end design, incorporating the new large Renault badge, a different headlamp configuration and mirror-mounted indicators.

In Turkey, it is offered with a 1.2-litre 16-valve petrol engine, developing 55 kW (75 PS) and 107 N⋅m (10.9 m⋅kgf), or a 1.5-litre diesel engine, developing 66 kW (90 PS) and 220 N⋅m (22.4 m⋅kgf). In both cases, they are coupled either to a 5-speed manual transmission, or after the 2017 facelift, the 5-speed Easy-R automated manual transmission. It is available in seven colours and two trim levels, which are Joy and Touch.

In Chile, it is equipped with a 1.6-litre petrol engine, capable of developing 61 kW (83 PS) and 131 N⋅m (13.4 m⋅kgf). It comes in three trim levels: Expression, Dynamique and Privilege.

=== Facelift ===
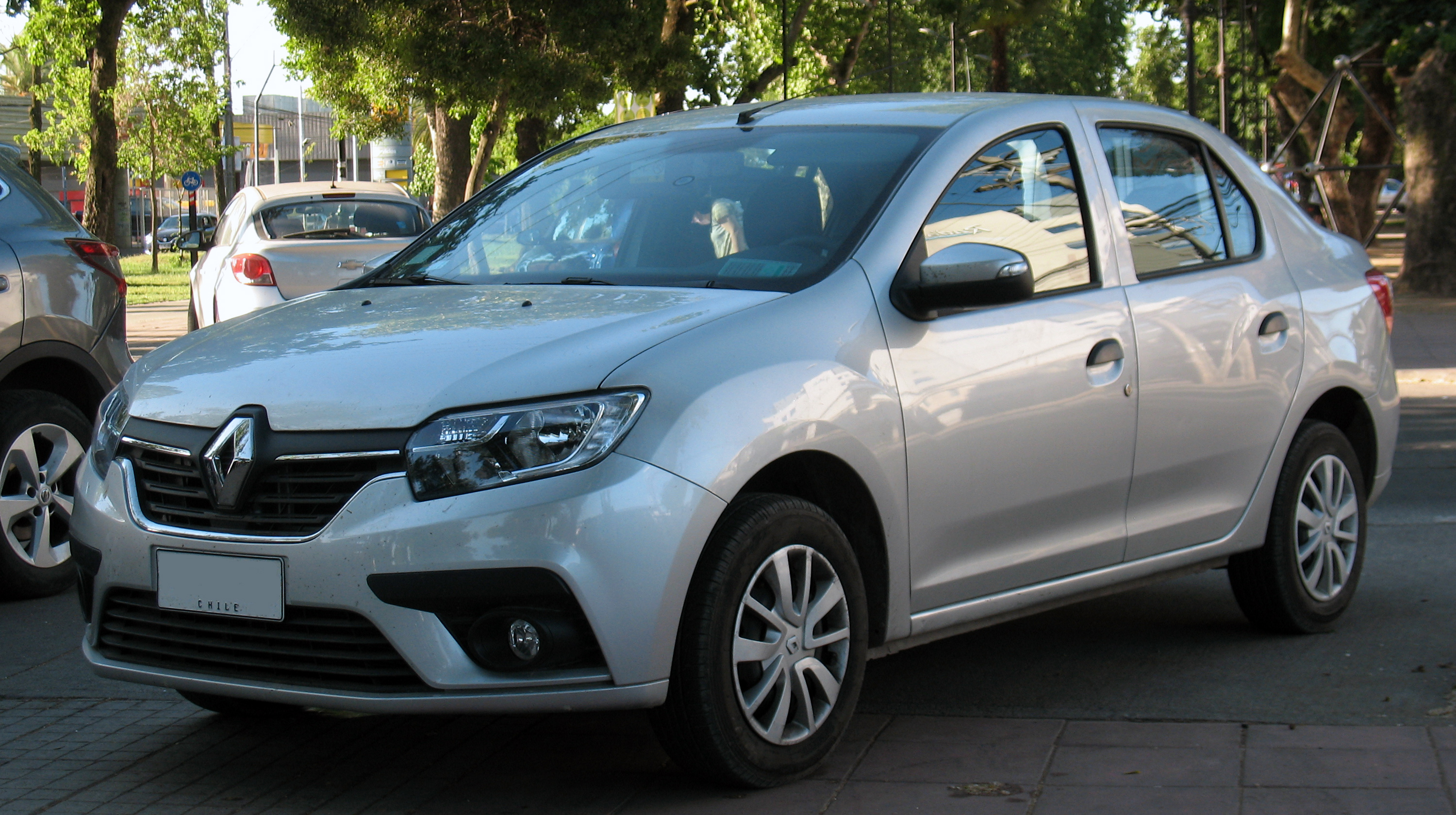
Renault Symbol (Chile, facelift)

In the first quarter of 2017, it was facelifted, receiving design modifications to the front with LED daytime running lights and more significantly to the rear design with a new trunk and new taillights, but also to the interior including a new 3-spoke steering wheel with the horn, in Turkey (and nearby export markets) and, as well, in Chile. An important addition is the Dacia Easy-R automated manual transmission.

The facelifted model is slightly different in terms of design and even equipment from the Renault Logan offered in the rest of Latin America.

The facelifted Symbol is not sold in Mexico, leaving Renault without a saloon in the Mexican market until the Arkana replaced it.

=== Other markets ===
Sales in Iran starts on August 2015. Also in the first quarter of 2017, the updated version was launched in several Persian Gulf states, such as Saudi Arabia, the United Arab Emirates, and Qatar.

== Sales ==
Year	Brazil sales	
Year	Clio Sedan	Symbol
2003	12,359	—N/a
2004	15,582	—N/a
2005	15,837	—N/a
2006	16,266	—N/a
2007	12,571	—N/a
2008	4,421	—N/a
2009	935	6,442
2010	—N/a	8,391
2011	—N/a	6,157
2012	—N/a	6,597
2013	—N/a	926

== See also ==
- Renault Clio, the base model for the first two generations
- Dacia Logan, the base model for the third generation, in turn based on the Renault Clio platform
- Nissan B platform, the platform that forms the basis for several related models
