= Oyak-Renault =

Turkish automotive manufacturer

OYAK Renault Otomobil Fabrikaları A.Ş.
- Type: Joint-stock company
- Industry: Automotive industry
- Founded: 4 December 1969; 56 years ago
- Headquarters: Bursa, Turkey
- Area served: Worldwide
- Key people: Tunç Başeğmez (CEO)
- Products: Automobiles
- Production output: 360,000
- Revenue: ▲€4.2 billion (2023)
- Owner: Renault (51%); OYAK (49%)
- Number of employees: 5,739 (December 2013)
- Website: oyak-renault.com

OYAK Renault Otomobil Fabrikaları A.Ş. or OYAK-Renault is a Turkish automotive manufacturer located in Bursa. It is co-owned by OYAK (Turkish: Ordu Yardımlaşma Kurumu, English: Army Solidarity Institution, a pension fund) and Renault. OYAK owns 49% and Renault owns 51% of the company.

== History ==
Oyak-Renault was established on 4 December 1969 by Renault, Oyak and Yapi Kredi Bank, starting production two years later.

The company originally manufactured various Renault models for the local and international market. Currently, some models are exported to up to 100 countries worldwide.

In 2018, the company produced 336,888 automobiles and 602,421 engines. In the same year, it was announced that it exported approximately 80% of its automobile production.

== Operations ==
With an annual production capacity of 286,000 up to 360,000 units, it is the largest Renault factory outside Western Europe. The official car dealer network of Renault in Turkey is another joint venture known as MAİS A.Ş.

In addition to the automotive assembly, the plant operates its own gearbox and engine manufacturing. Currently, they are manufacturing 450 different engines, 450,000 units a year. In the three-shift operation, more than 5,900 workers are employed.

== Current models ==
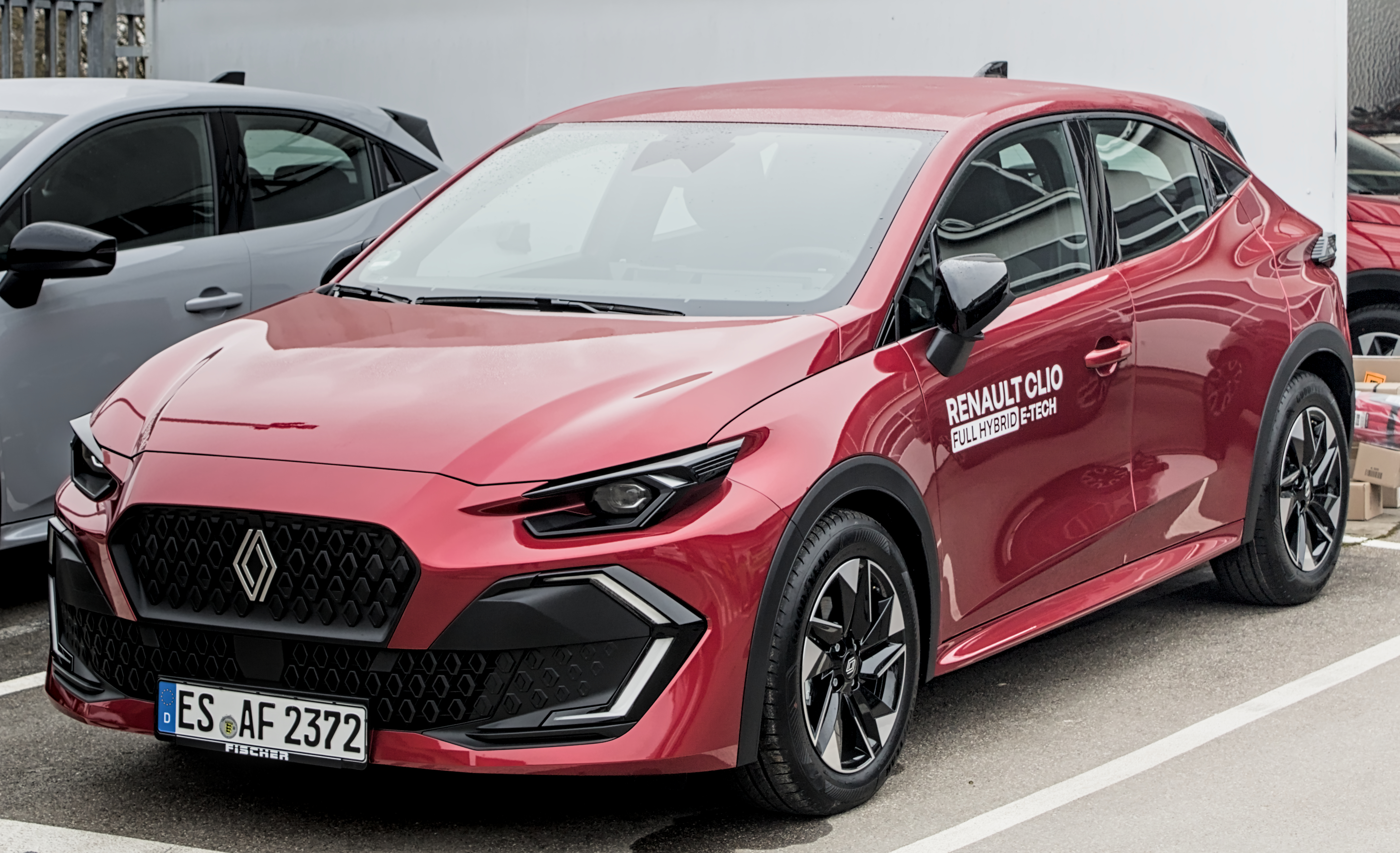
Renault Clio HB
2025–present

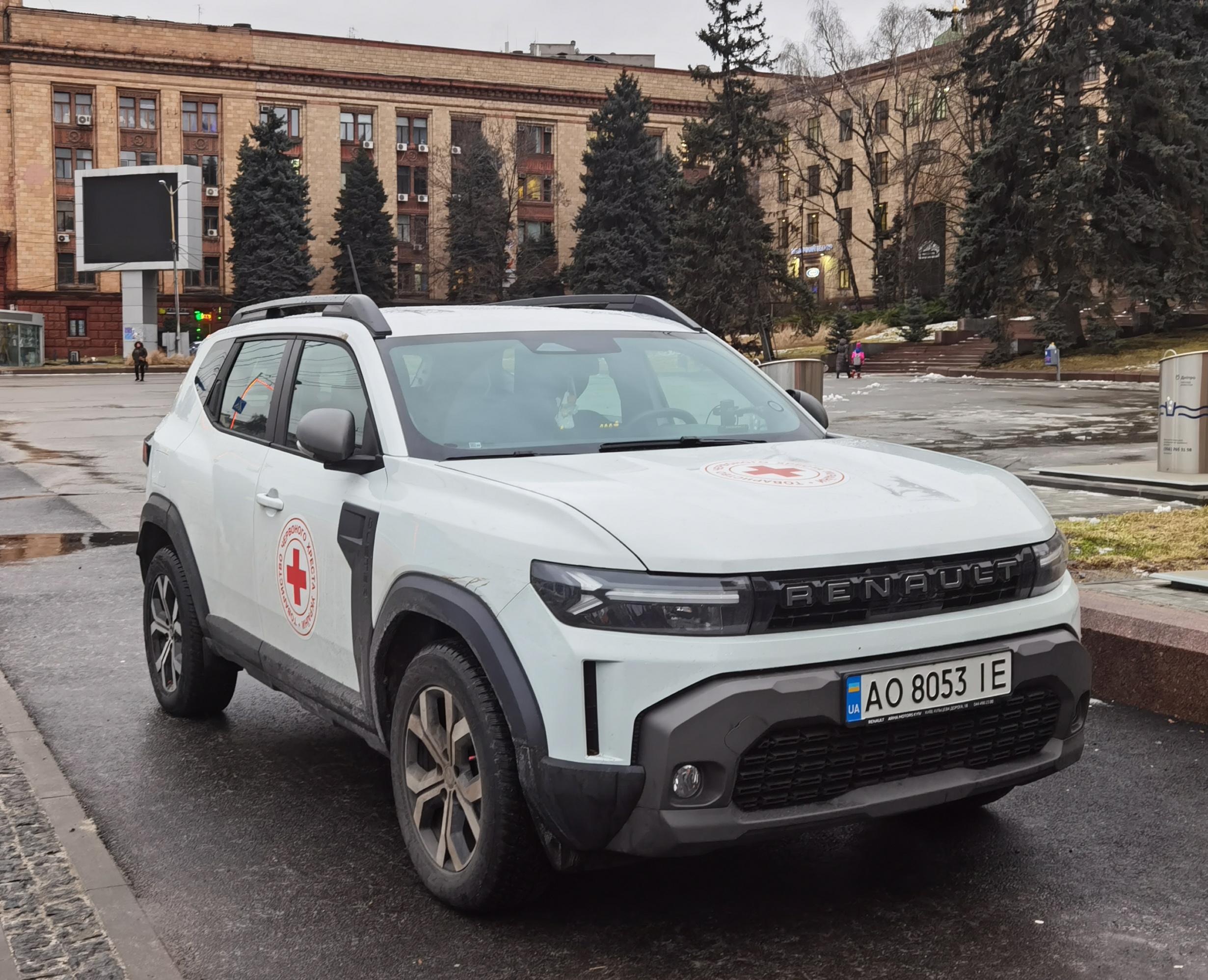
Renault Duster
2025–present

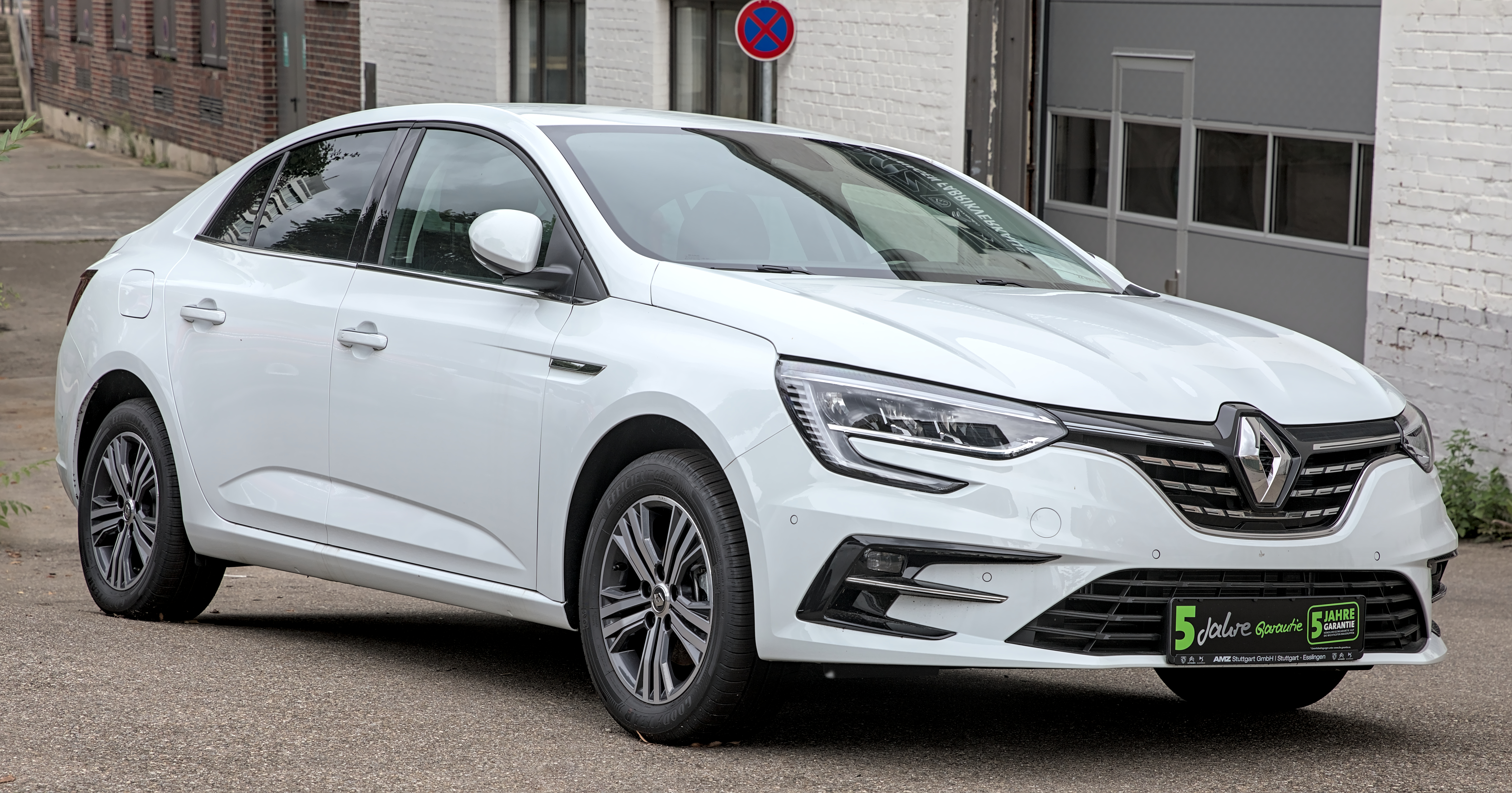
Renault Mégane sedan
2016–present

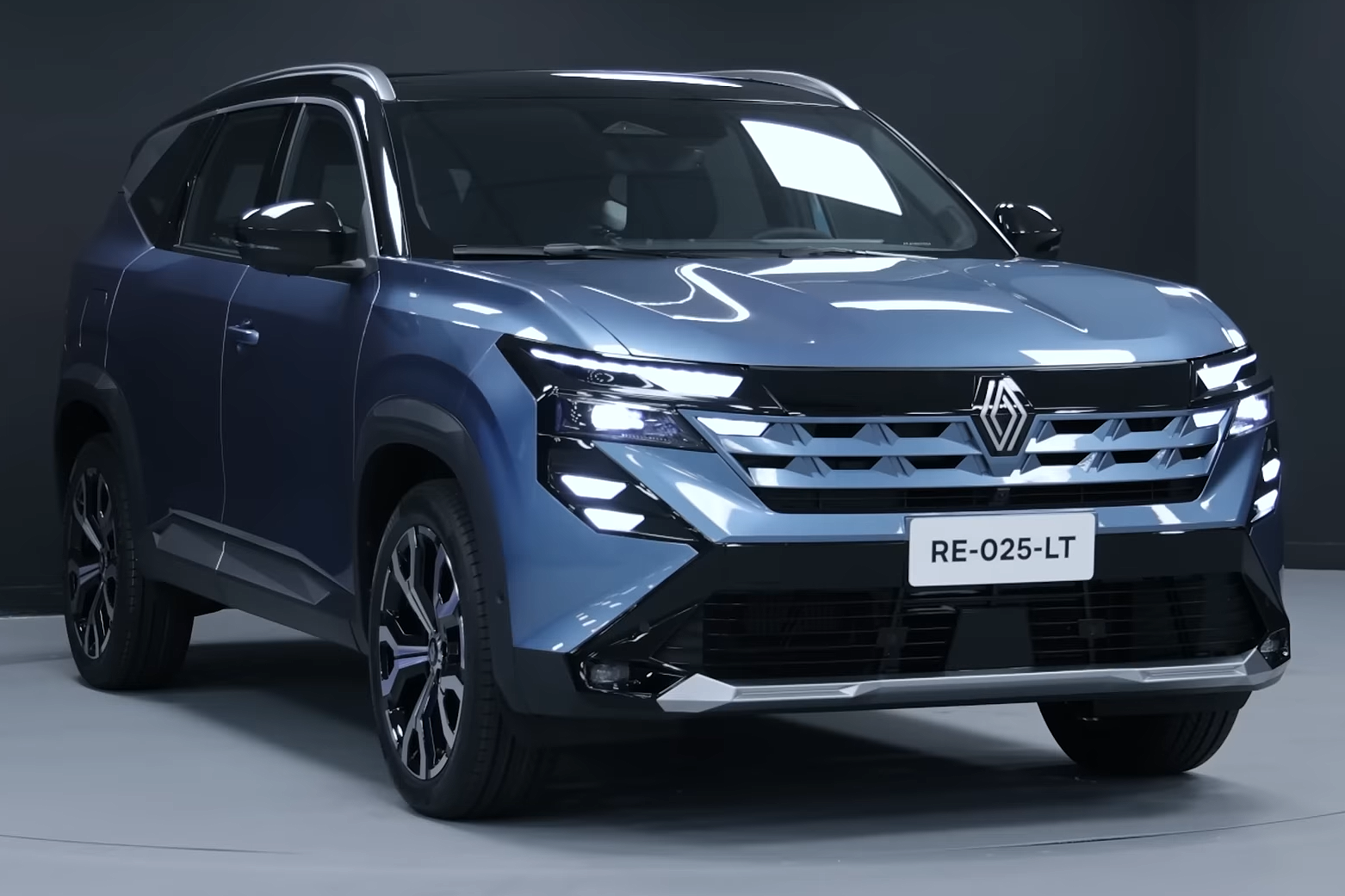
Renault Boreal 2026–present

Dacia Striker 2026-Present

== Former models ==
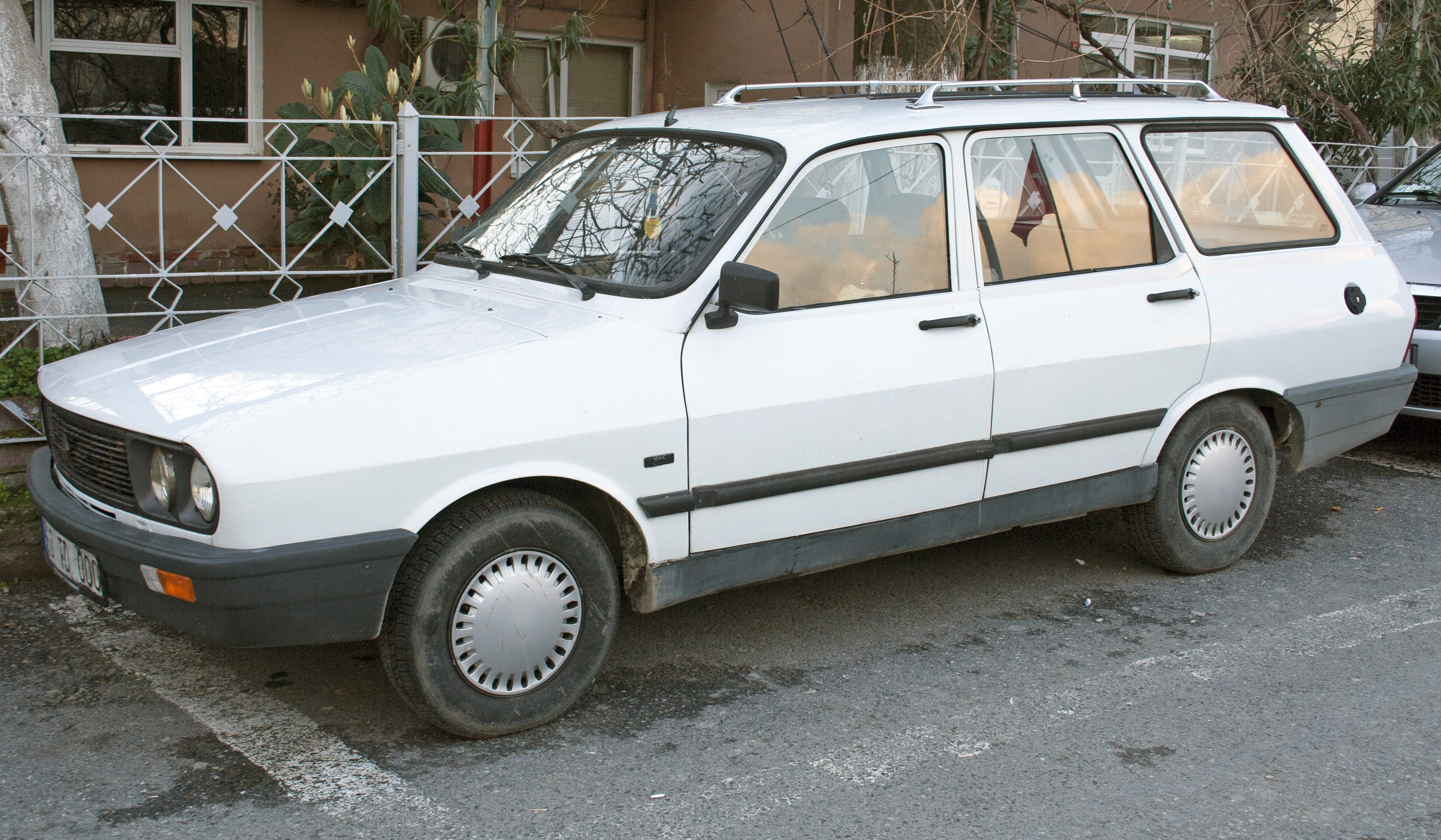
Renault 12
1971–1989
Renault 12 Toros
1989–2000

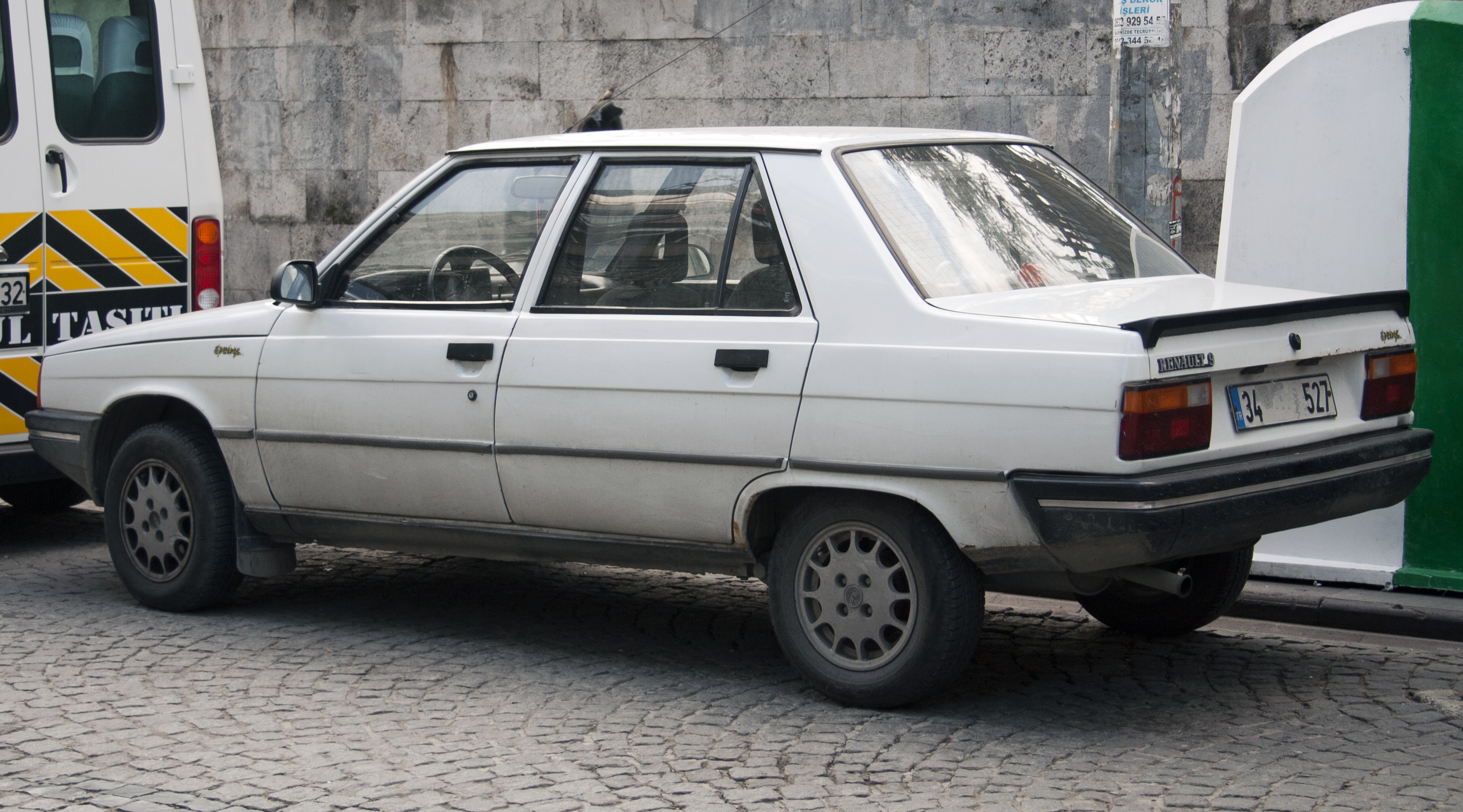
Renault 9 Broadway/Spring
1985–2000

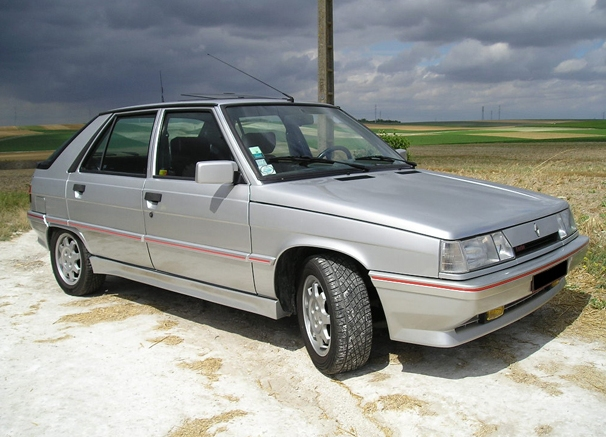
Renault 11 Flash
1987–1996

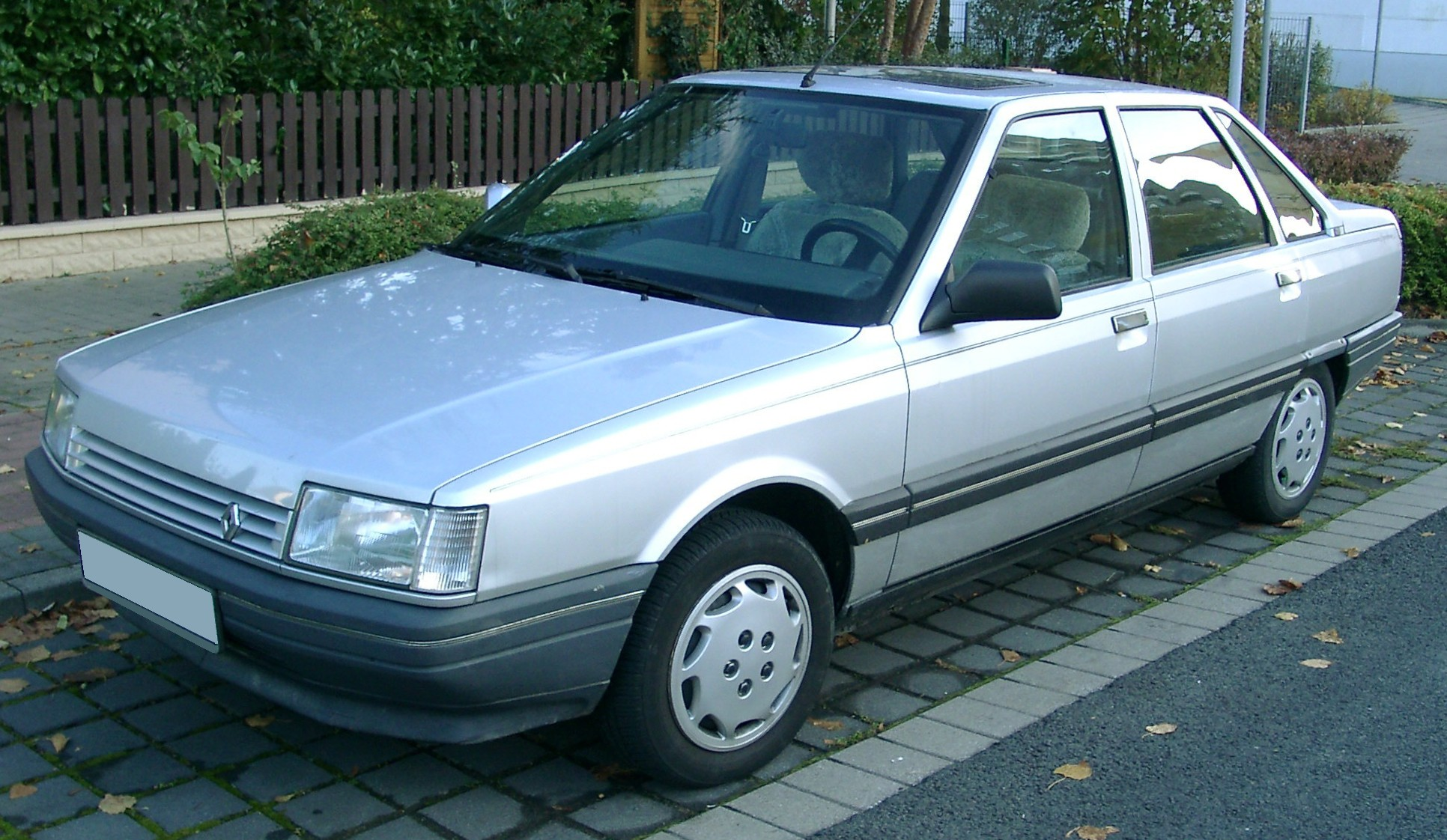
Renault 21 Manager
1990–1995

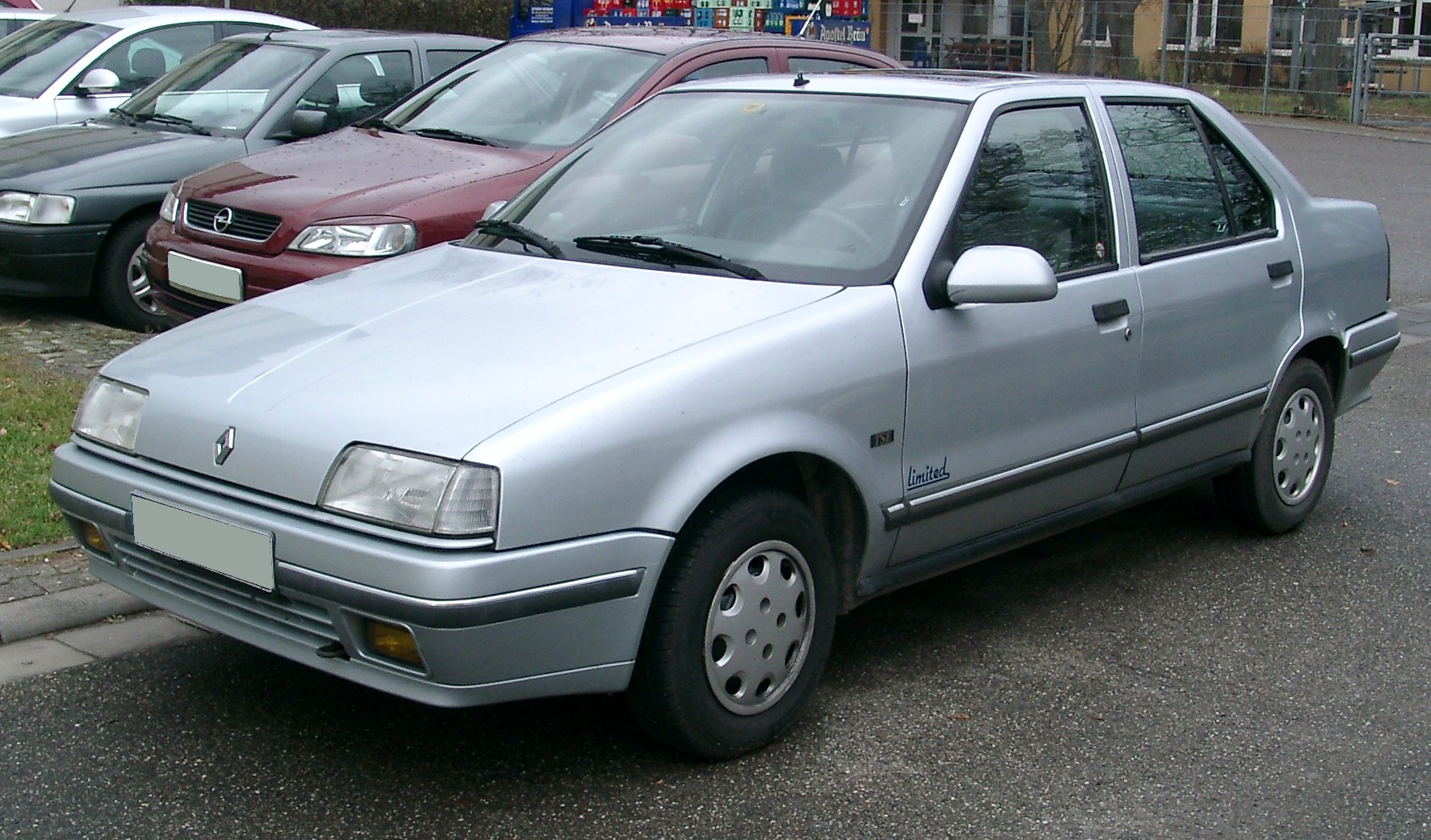
Renault 19
1992–1996

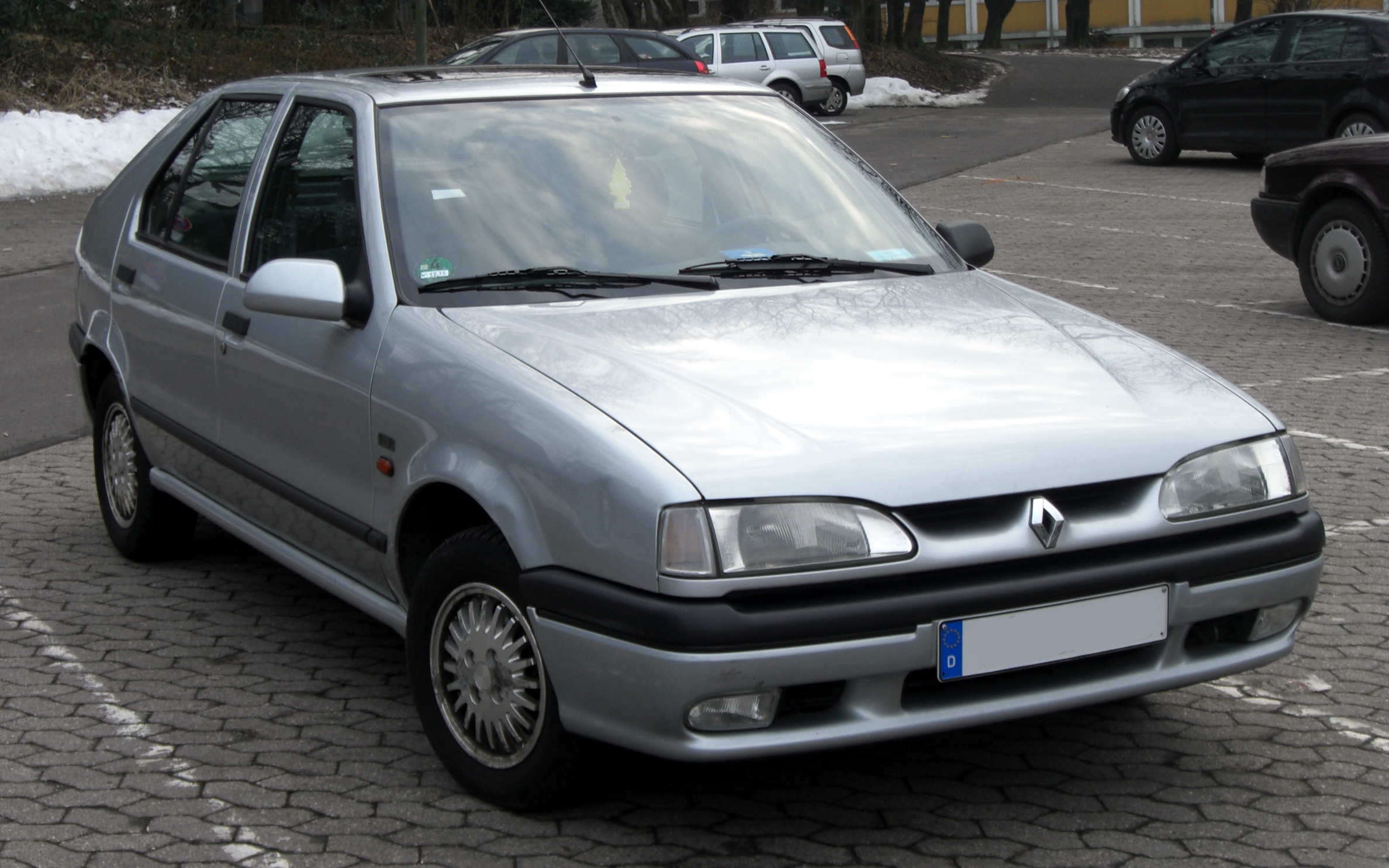
Renault 19 Europa
1996–2003

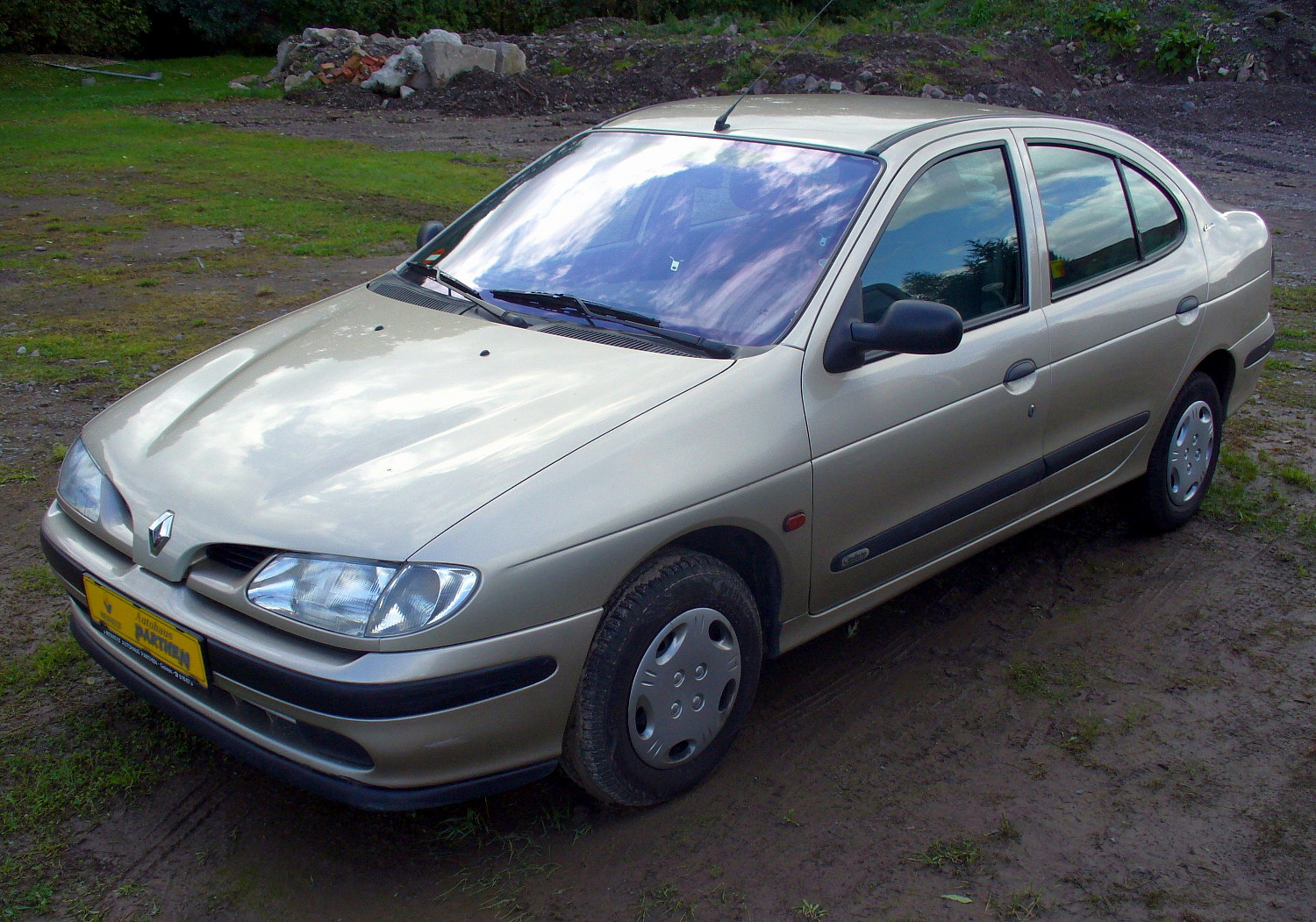
Renault Mégane
1997–2003

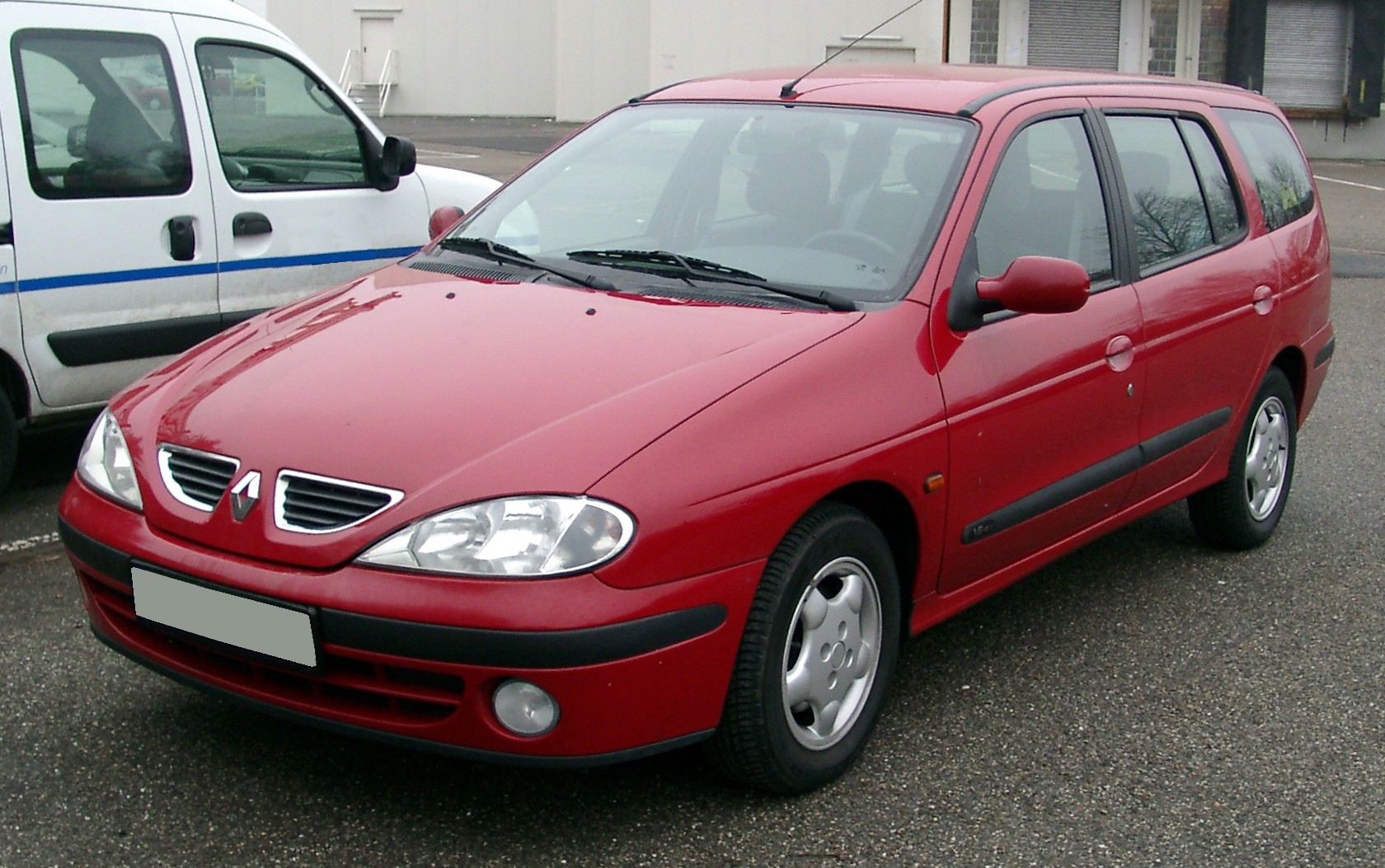
Renault Mégane Grand Tour
1998–2003

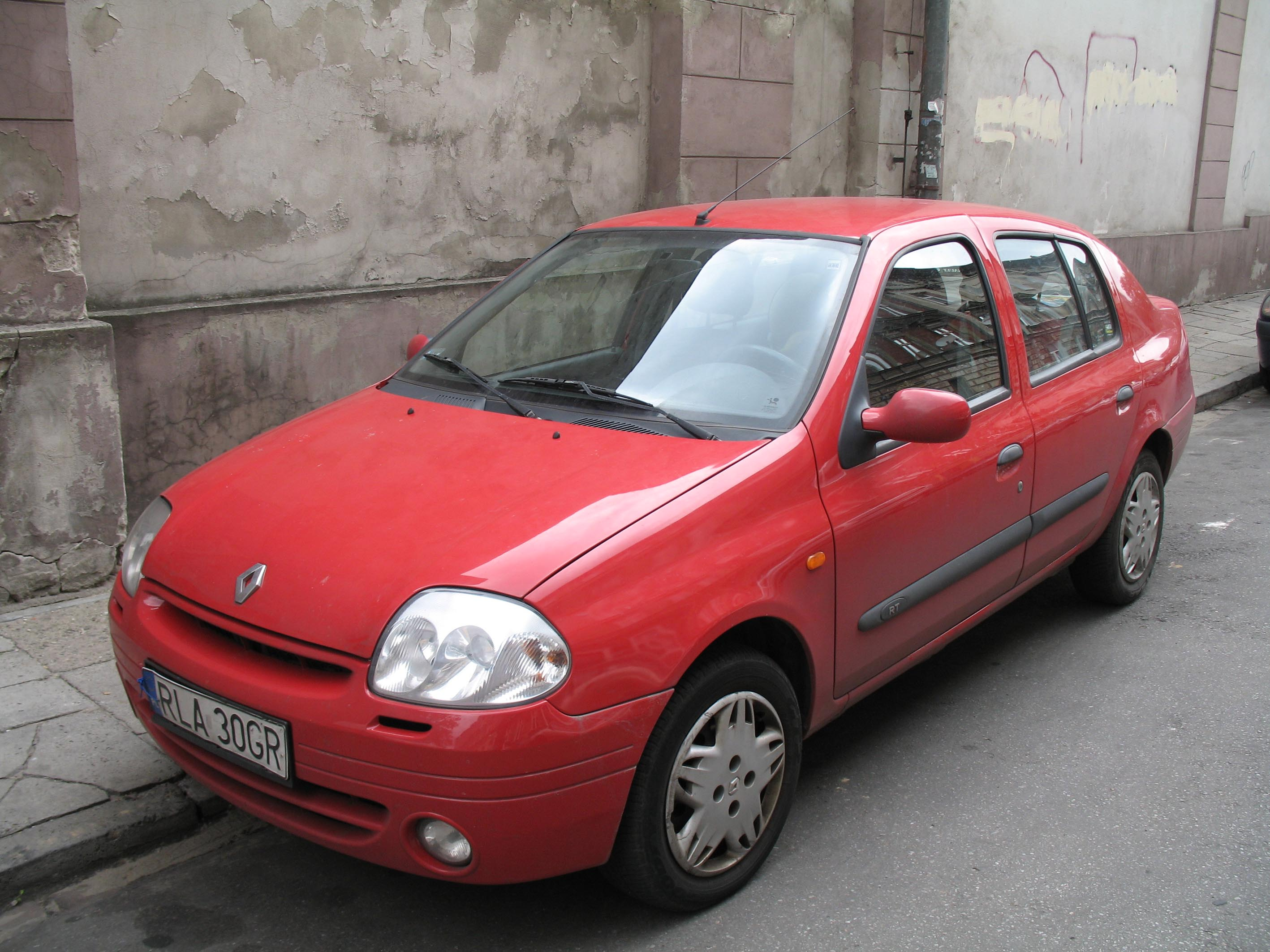
Renault Clio Symbol/
Thalia
1999–2008

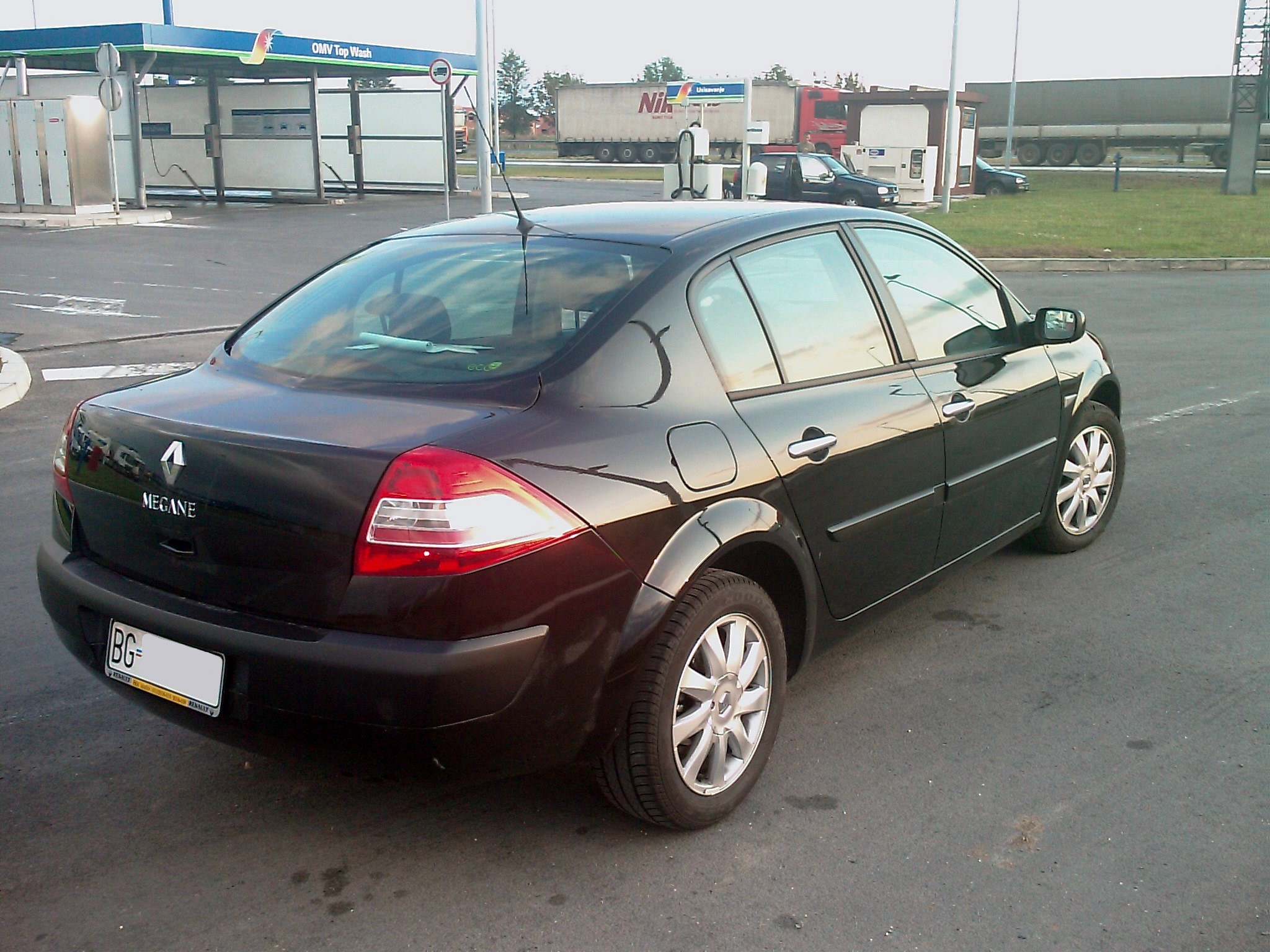
Renault Mégane Sedan
2003–2009

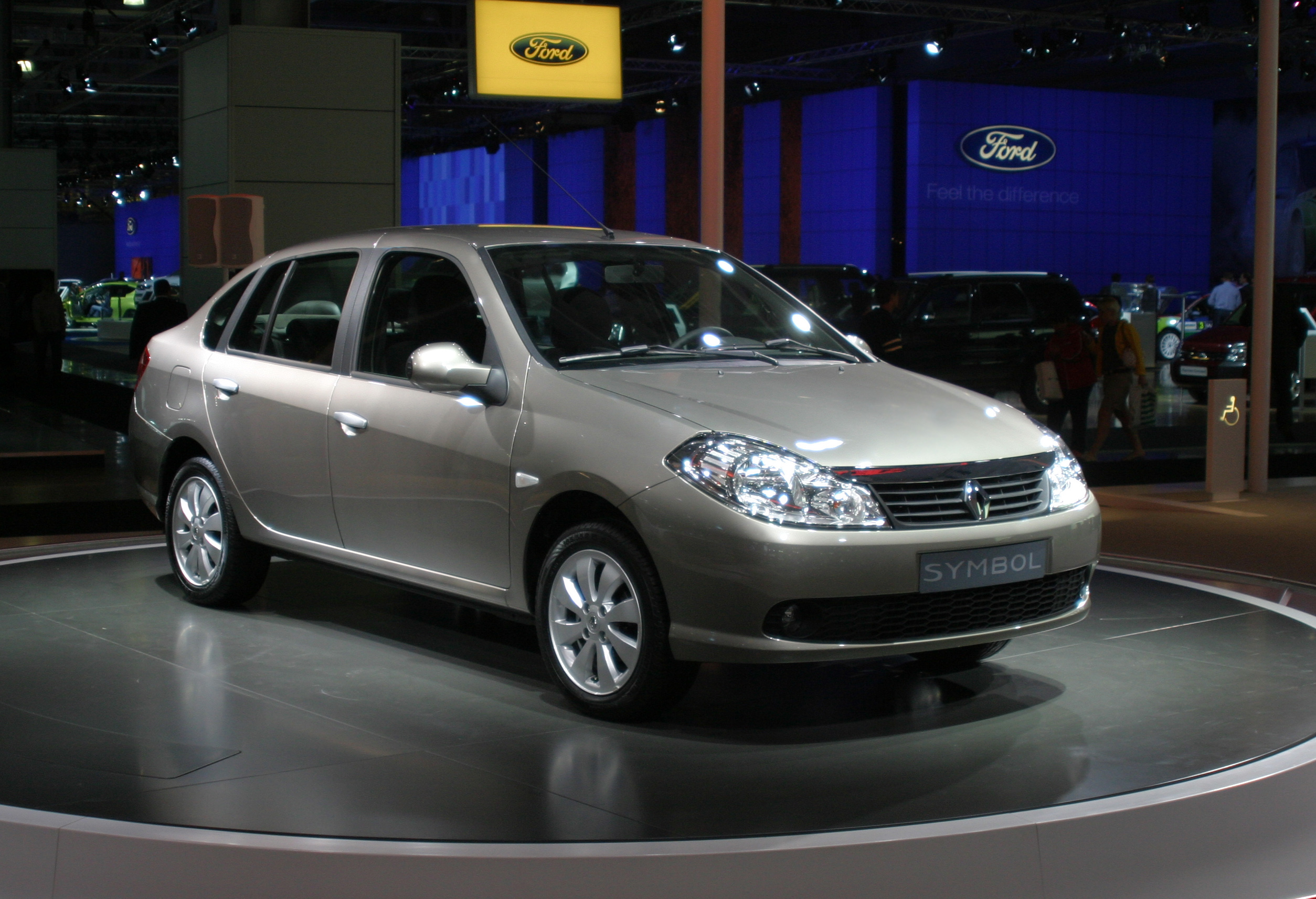
Renault Symbol/Thalia
2008-2013

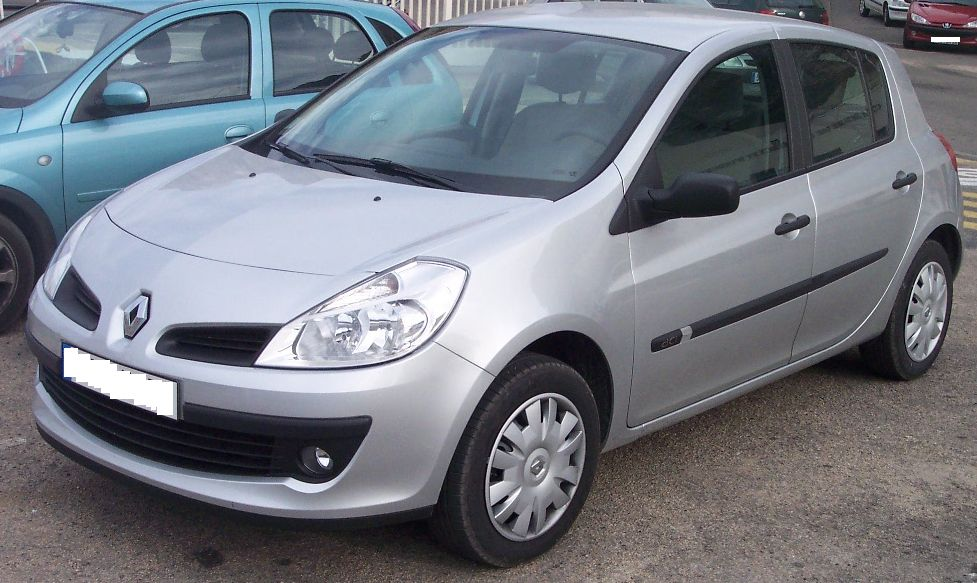
Renault Clio HB
2006-2014

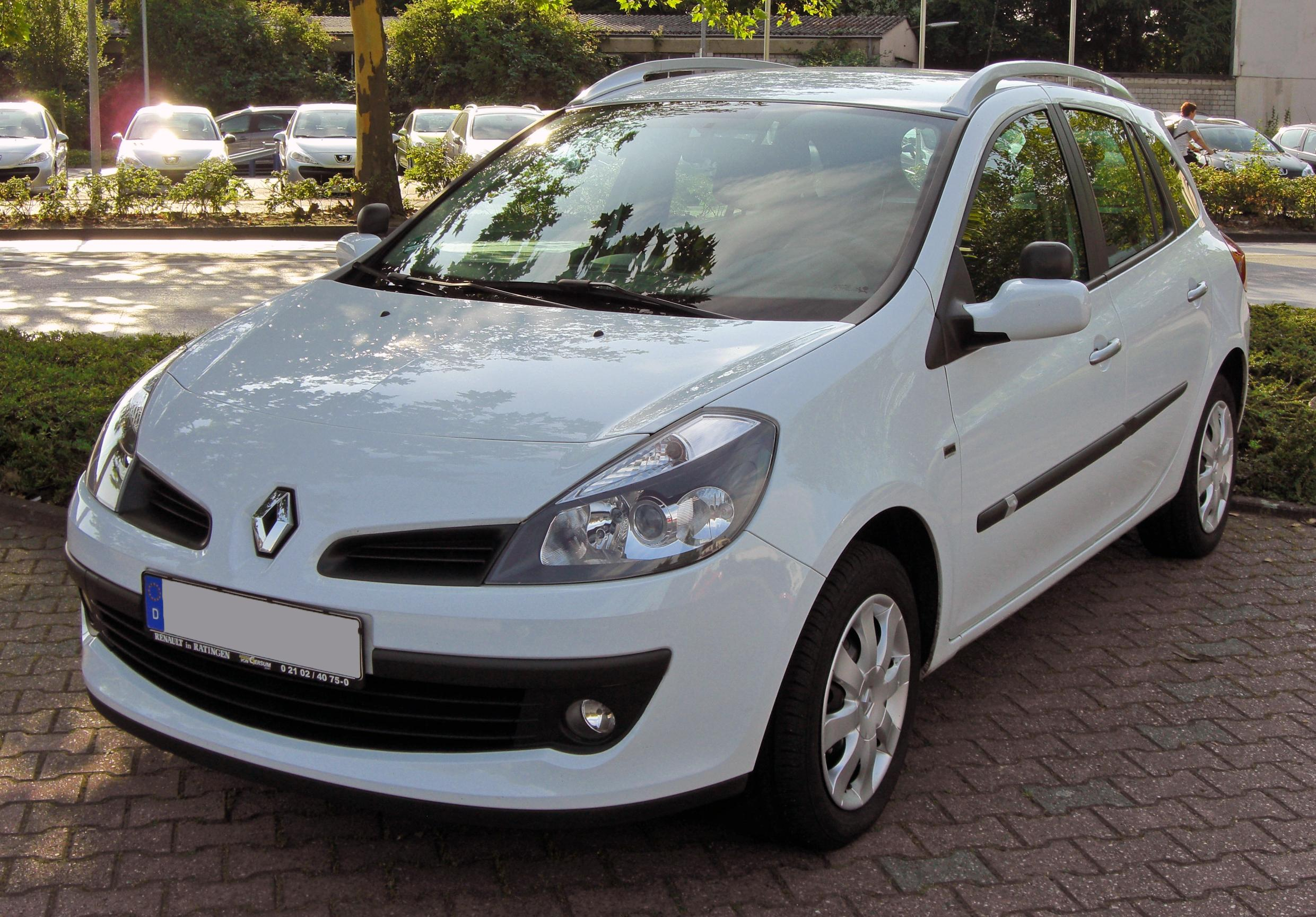
Renault Clio Grand Tour
2007–2014

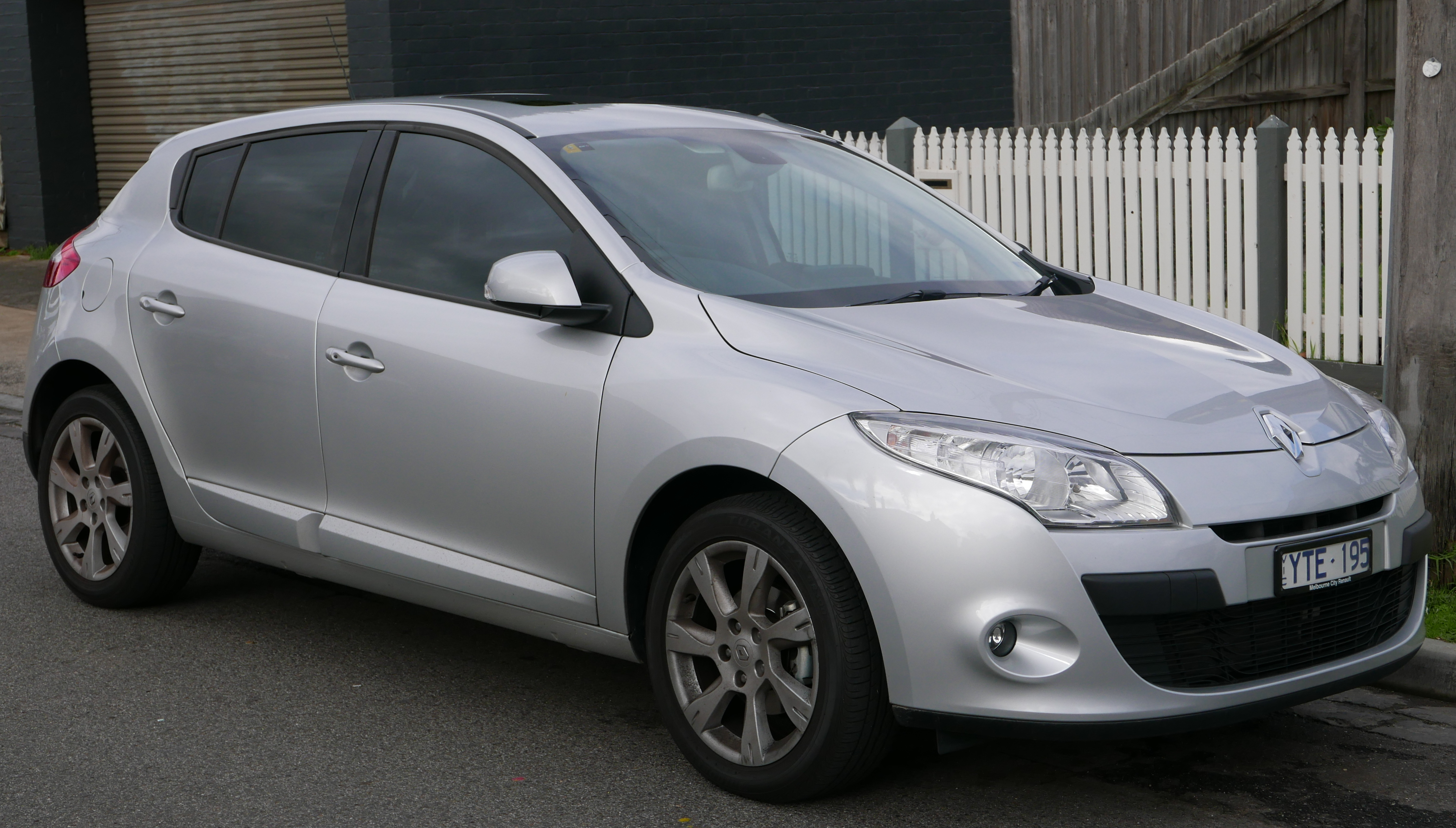
Renault Mégane HB
2009-2016

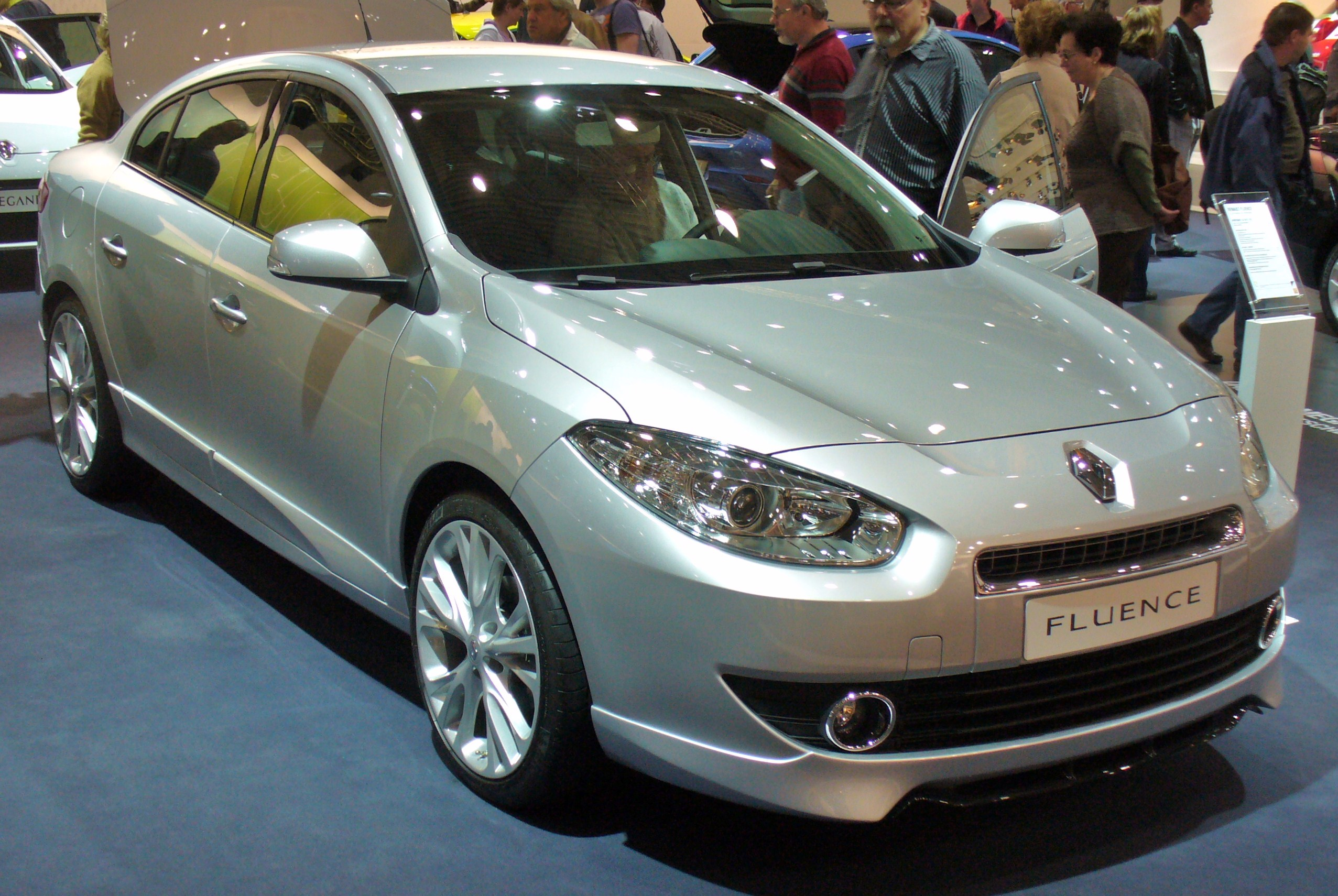
Renault Fluence
2009–2016

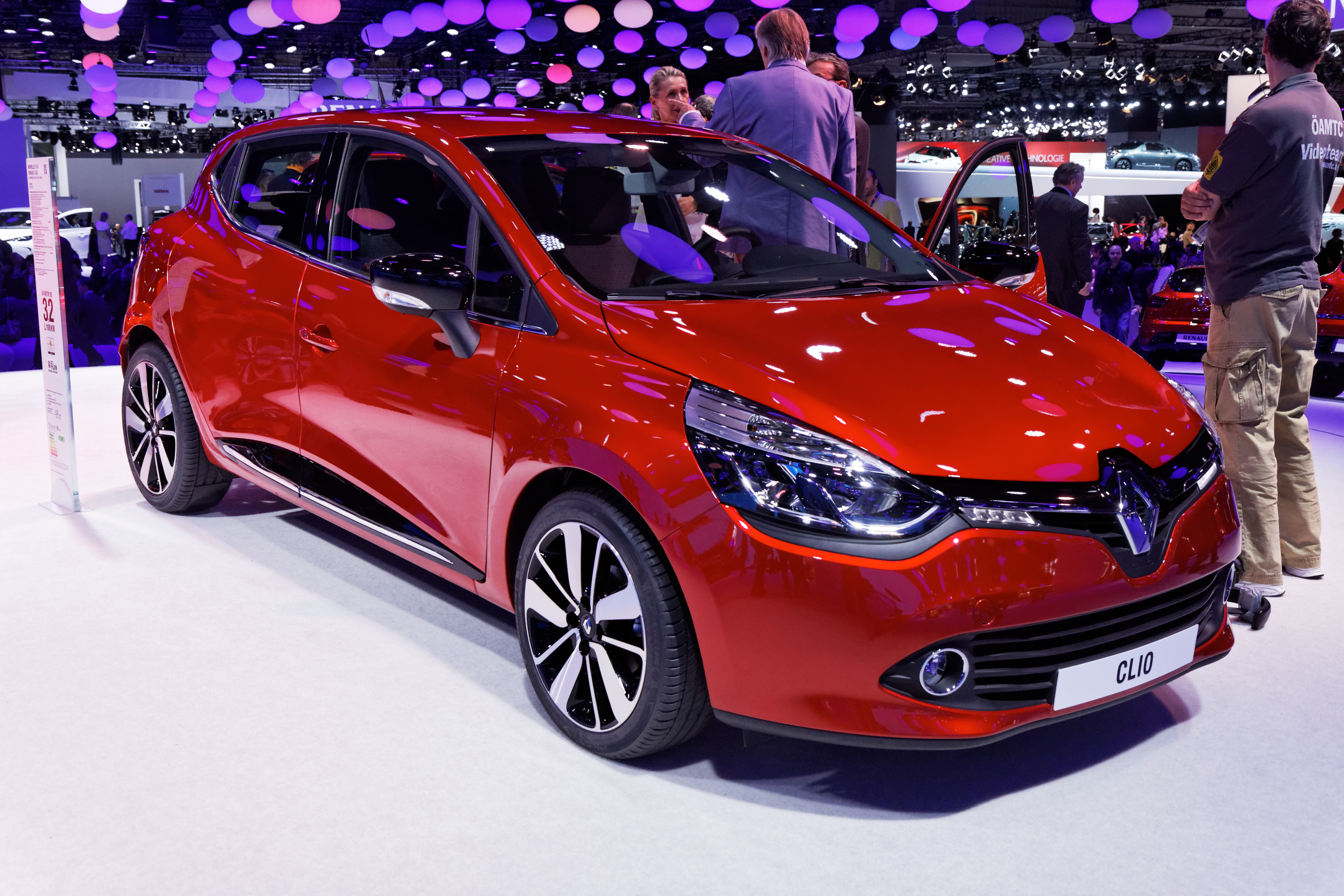
Renault Clio HB
2012–2019

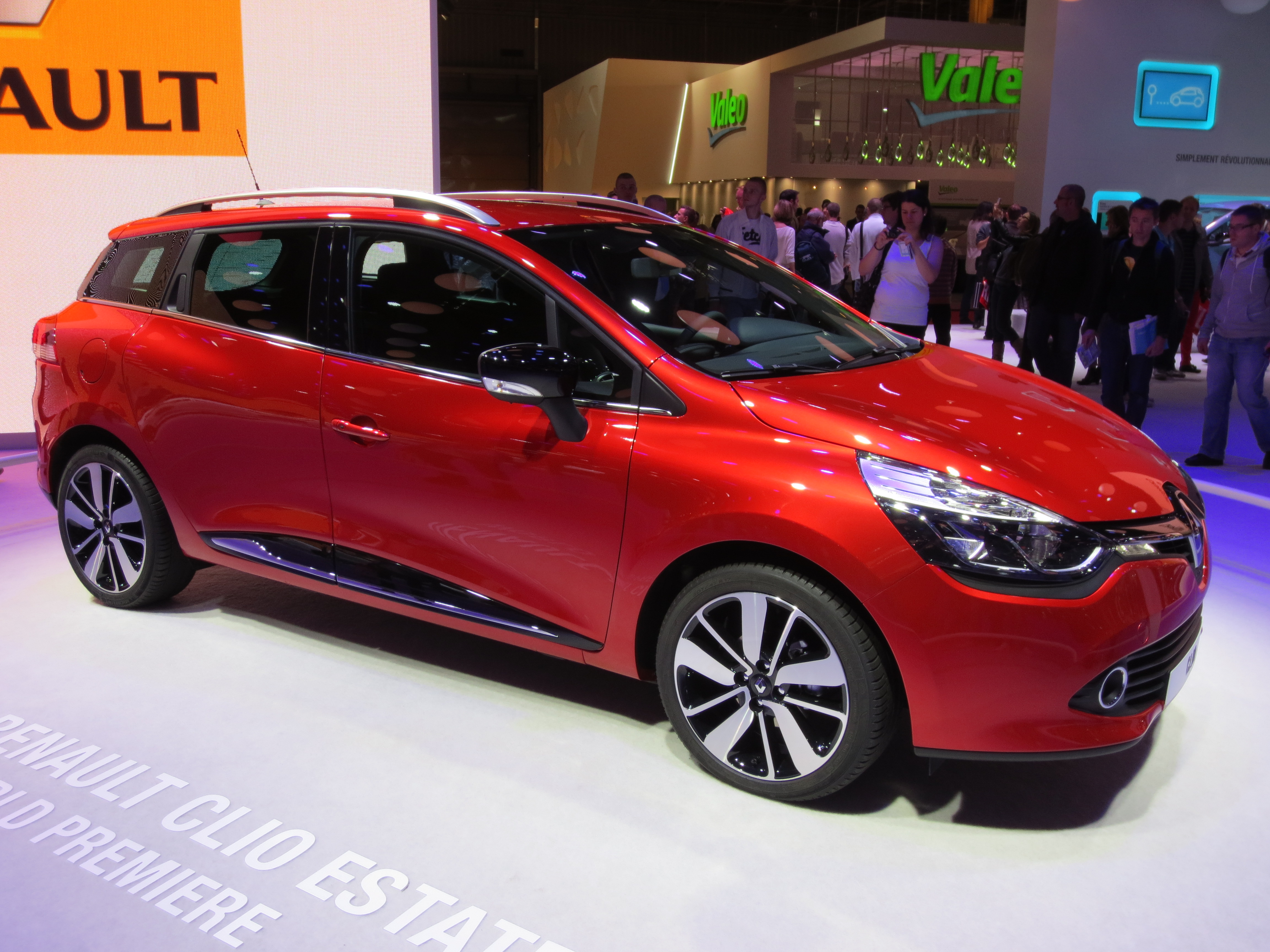
Renault Clio Estate
2012–2019

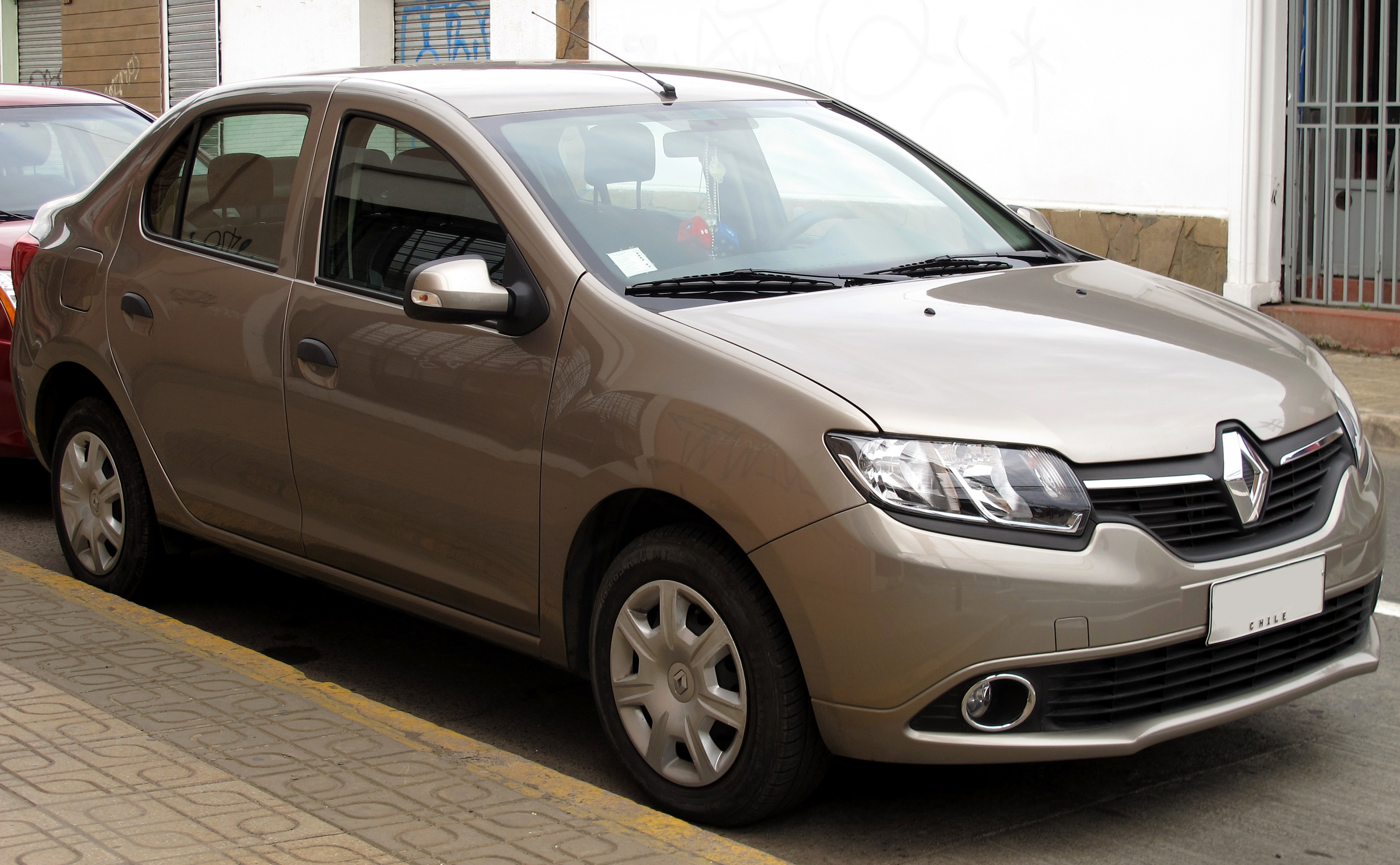
Renault Symbol
2013–2021

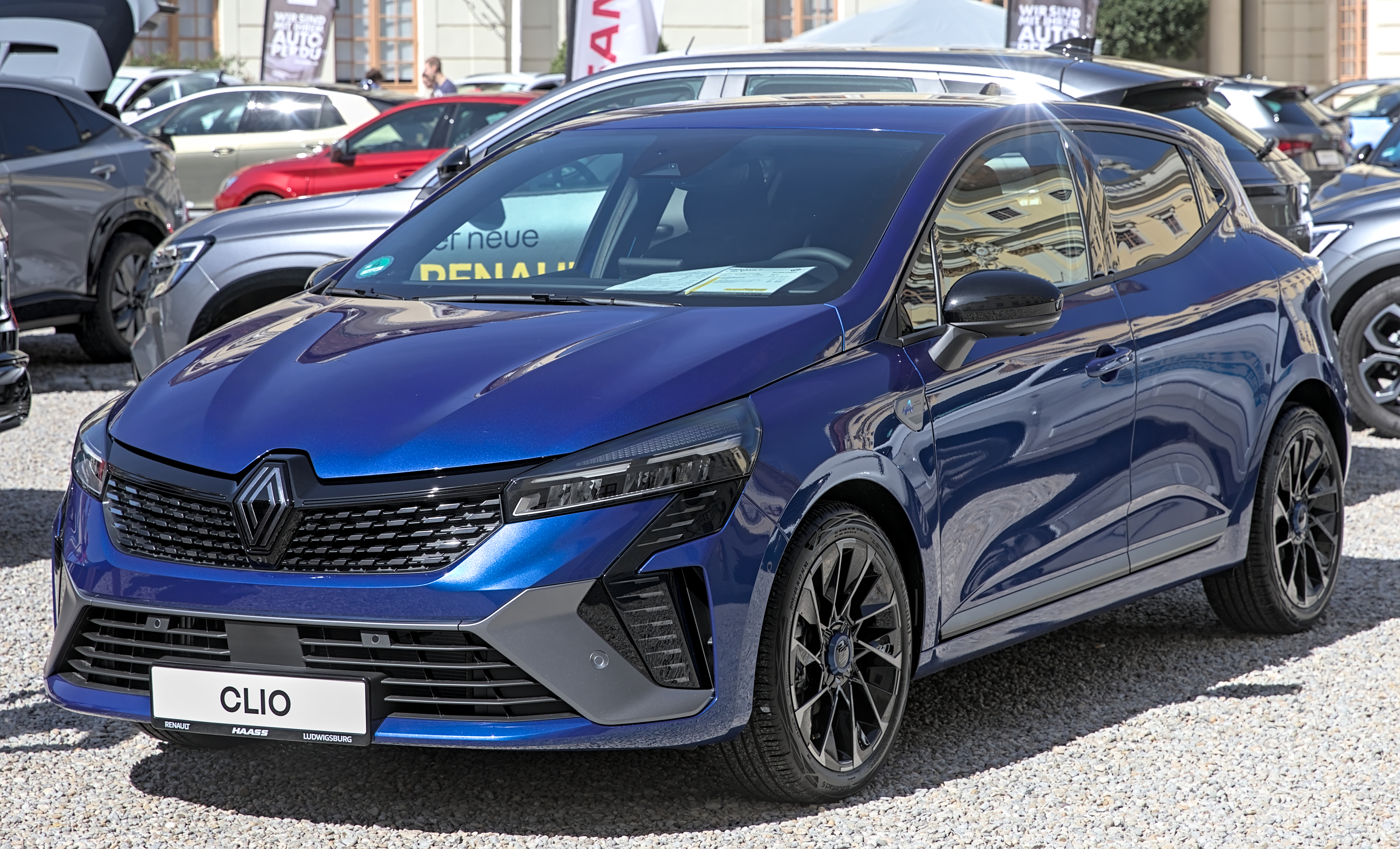
Renault Clio HB
2018–2025

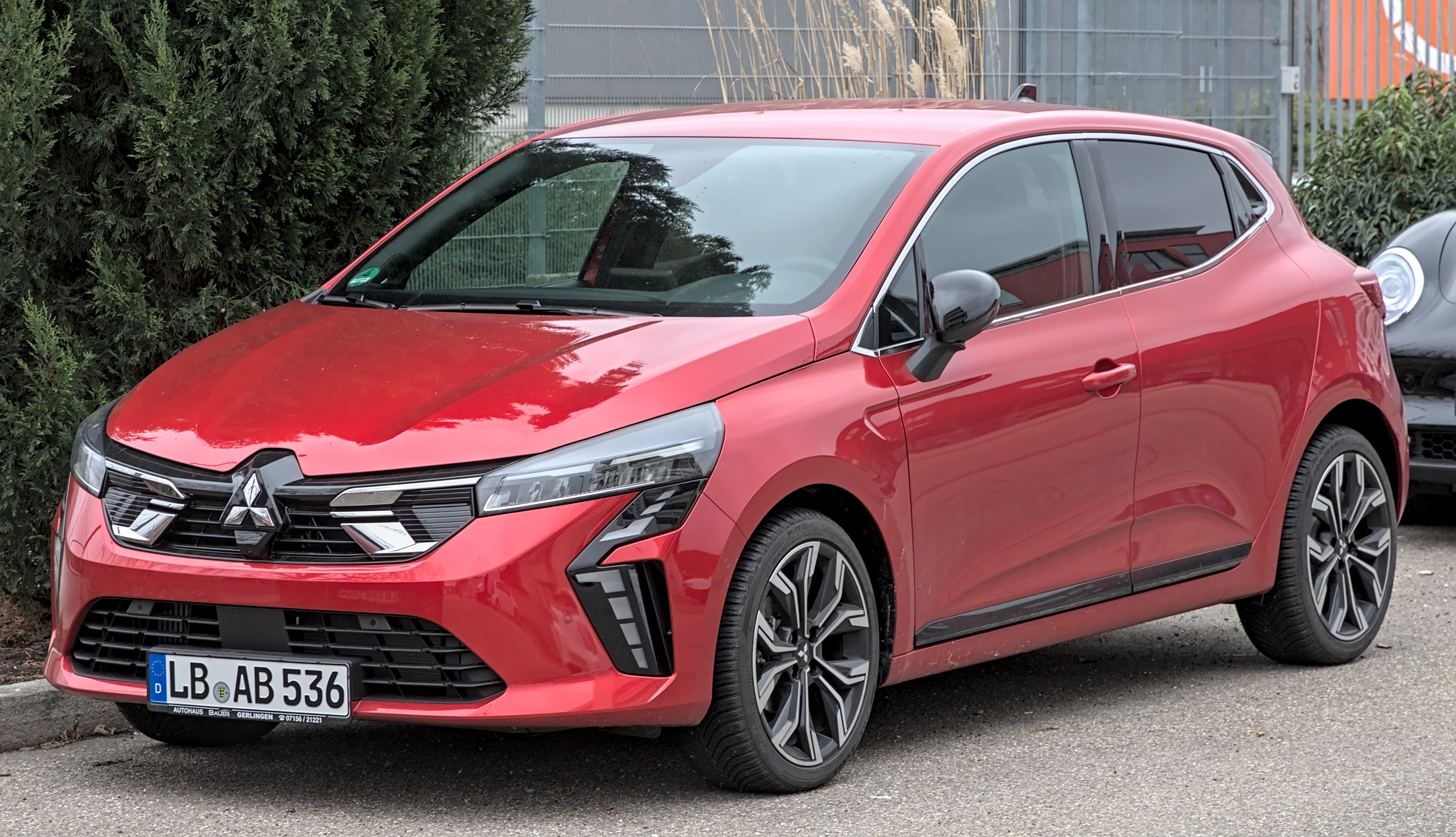
Mitsubishi Colt
2023–2025

== See also ==
- List of companies of Turkey
- Bulgarrenault
- MAVA-Renault
