= Sofasa =

Colombian company

Renault Sofasa S.A.S.
- Type: Subsidiary
- Industry: Automotive
- Founded: 1969
- Headquarters: Envigado, Colombia
- Key people: Juan Camilo Vélez (President and CEO)
- Parent: Renault
- Website: www.renault.com.co

Sociedad de Fabricación de Automotores (SOFASA) is a Colombian company that assembles imported Renault and, in the past, Toyota and Daihatsu Delta vehicles. It was the first company to produce the Renault Logan in the Americas. In addition to Logan also manufactured Renault Clio, Renault Symbol, Renault Megane and Renault Twingo. It also manufactured trucks like Toyota Prado, Toyota Land Cruiser, Toyota Hilux and Daihatsu Delta. The company exports to the Andean Community of Nations (CAN) and supplies the national market of automobiles in Colombia. Currently, Renault is the sole shareholder of the company. As of 2019 the capacity of the company reached 70 000 cars per year making it the biggest car exporter in the region.

== History ==
SOFASA was founded in 1969 and started assembling cars from the French company Renault. A year later produced the first car: the Renault 4L. In 1972, began assembling its second model: the Renault 6, with the 1.108cc engine. In 1973, the Renault 12 is added to the line, and the Break version was added the following year.

In 1975 introduced the new version of the Renault 4 as Renault 4 Plus 25, which had a 1.022cc engine developed in Colombia and that was 25% more powerful than its predecessor. In 1976, SOFASA launched the restyling for the Renault 6 and 12 corresponding to the worldwide updates Renault made for both models. Also in that year, SOFASA released the Renault 12 taxicab version, which completed the range until 1981.

In 1981, the company began assembling the Renault 18 GTL, GTL Break and the Taxi version, replacing Renault 12, after the latter sold about 56,250 units between 1973 and 1981.

In 1983 Renault 9 was released, one of the best selling cars in Colombia (about 115,000). In that year the company released the new Renault 4 GTL (later known as Master) in new colours, aesthetic and image. Next year, the Renault 9 Taxi was launched while Renault 6 is discontinued (42,500 units were produced). In 1985 Renault 18 GTX is introduced, which was the most powerful car manufactured by SOFASA at that time (2.000cc engine, 100 HP) with some exterior modifications. In 1987 Renault 18 is discontinued (with 45,100 units sold) and replaced by the Renault 21, a powerful and luxurious car by the time it was released. In addition, the Renault 9 is reworked into new versions (GTL and GTS).

In 1989, the Renault 4 LIDER was introduced, powered by a 1.300cc engine from Renault 12 (not replacing the Master), and the Renault 21 Étoile in 1990, being this one of the most luxurious models in the Colombian market and the first car with electronic fuel injection assembled in Colombia.

Three years later, in 1992, the Renault 4 is discontinued after producing 97,050 units between 1970 and 1992 (22 years) and Renault 9 is released in new versions Brio, Super and Max while Renault Clio is imported from France. It also begins the assembly of Toyota Land Cruiser and Toyota Hilux.

By 1993 the Renault range is updated including the 9, 21 Etoile (sedan, hatchback and Break) and Safrane imported from France.

The Bavaria Group acquired 51% shares of the Company in 1994. In April, launched the Renault 19 and begun the systematic plans of the company and the strengthening of commercial and customer service. SOFASA starts exports to Ecuador of Toyota Land Cruiser and Hilux.

In 1995 under a strategy to expand the range, SOFASA launched the Renault Twingo and creates a subsidiary in Venezuela, SOFAVEN, for commercial operations in that country. Additionally, imports Renault Laguna and presents two new versions of Renault 19.

SOFASA commercially launched the Renault Clio in 1996 and introduces the Renault 9 Personnalité while starts Renault exports to Venezuela and Ecuador.

Two years later the company started imports of Renault Midliner commercial motor vehicles. That same year, launched the Toyota Prado. Next year Renault 9 is discontinued and Megane is introduced. Renault Symbol and Clio II are introduced in 2001. The Renault Megane II was introduced in Colombia in 2003.

With the sale of shares of Bavaria in 2003, the new shareholding structure of the company was Renault 60%, Toyota 28% and Mitsui 12% but five years later Mitsui sold its stake in SOFASA to Renault and Toyota.

In 2005, SOFASA launches the Renault Logan. A year later Toyota begun the production of its vehicles Daihatsu and Hino in Envigado. In 2008, Renault purchased all the SOFASA's stake. That same, it was initiated the manufacturing of the Renault Sandero at Envigado factory while Koleos is imported from South Korea.

In 2011, SOFASA introduced the Renault Fluence (imported). The Renault Duster is assembled in Envigado since 2012

== Assembled models ==
=== Current models ===
Produced

- Logan (2005–present)
- Duster (2012–present)

Imported

- Fluence Z.E.
- Koleos
- Kangoo and Kangoo Z.E.
- Master
- Trafic
- Twizy
- Zoe

=== Previous models ===
Renault

- 4 (1970–1992) - 97,050 vehicles produced
- 6 (1971–1984)
- 9 (1983–1999)
- 12 (1973–1981)
- 18 (1981–1987)
- 19 (1994–2001)
- 21 (1987–1994)
- Twingo I (1995–2012) - 100,000 vehicles produced
- Mégane I (1999–2009)
- Symbol I (2001–2009)
- Clio I & II (1996–2017)
- Sandero (2008–2020)
- Sandero Stepway (2009–2020)

Toyota

- Land Cruiser J70 (1993–2008)
- Land Cruiser Prado J90 (1999–2008)
- Hilux V & VI (1994–2004)

Daihatsu

- Delta (2005–2010)
