= Renault 18 =

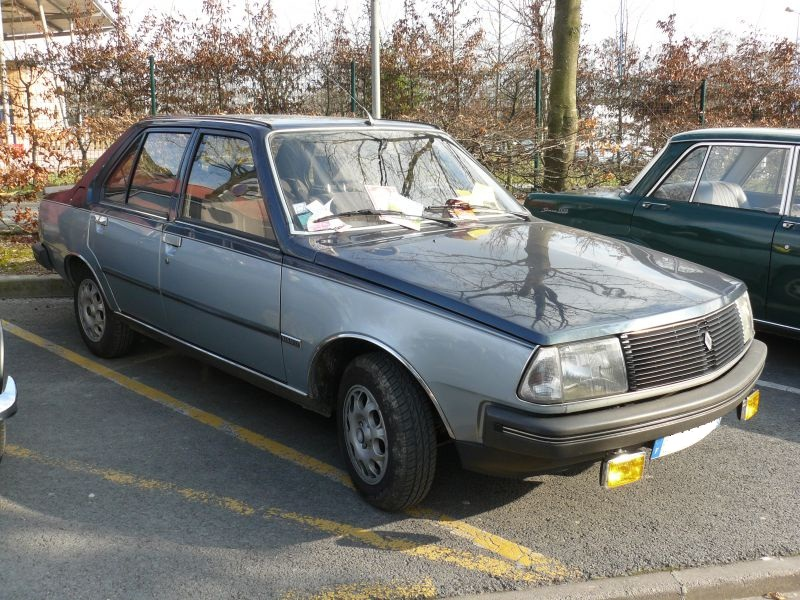
- 1984 R18 "American 2" special edition (France)

Overview
- Manufacturer: Renault
- Also called: Renault Sportwagon (North America); Dacia 1800 (Romania; cancelled)
- Production: 1978–1989; 1980–1994 (South America)
- Assembly: France: Boulogne-Billancourt; Argentina: Santa Isabel (Renault Argentina); Australia: Heidelberg (Renault Australia); Chile: Los Andes (Cormecánica); Colombia: Envigado (SOFASA); Ivory Coast: Abidjan; Mexico: Ciudad Sahagún; Morocco: Casablanca; Spain: Valladolid (FASA-Renault); Uruguay: Montevideo (Nordex S.A.); Venezuela: Mariara; Yugoslavia: Novo Mesto (IMV)

Body and chassis
- Class: Mid-size car / Large family car (D)
- Body style: 4-door sedan; 5-door station wagon
- Layout: Front-engine, front-wheel-drive
- Related: Renault Fuego

Powertrain
- Engine: Petrol: 1397 cc C1J I4; 1565 cc C2L I4 (Argentina); 1565 cc A5L/A7L turbo I4; 1647 cc A2M/A6M I4; 1995 cc J6R I4; 2165 cc J7T I4 (Argentina, US); Diesel: 2068 cc J8S diesel/TD I4
- Transmission: 4 / 5-speed manual; 3-speed automatic

Dimensions
- Wheelbase: 2,440 mm (96.1 in)
- Length: 4,390 mm (172.8 in)
- Width: 1,690 mm (66.5 in)
- Height: 1,400 mm (55.1 in)
- Curb weight: 940 kg (2,072 lb) (base)

Chronology
- Predecessor: Renault 12
- Successor: Renault 21; Eagle Medallion (North America)

The Renault 18 is a large family car produced by French manufacturer Renault between 1978 and 1989, with South American production continuing until 1994. It formed the basis for the closely related Renault Fuego Coupé, with which it shared its floorpan and drivetrain, but with the Fuego initially using the negative offset type front suspension from the larger Renault 20/30, which became standardized across the 18 range from the 1983 model year onwards.

== Development ==
The Renault 18 was intended as a replacement for the Renault 12, which, having been in production since 1969, was beginning to show its age by the late 1970s, though the 12 was kept in production alongside the 18 until 1980. Unlike the earlier car, the 18 was designed quickly; the time between its initial conception and its actual launch date was only eighteen months, primarily due to the fact that the 18 was based upon the 12's underpinnings. Production peaked early: 1979 was the R18's biggest year, after which sales began a gradual decline. Originally, the 1.4 was the most popular model, but this soon changed to the 1.6. By 1986 the largest, 2-liter engine represented the biggest portion of the production.

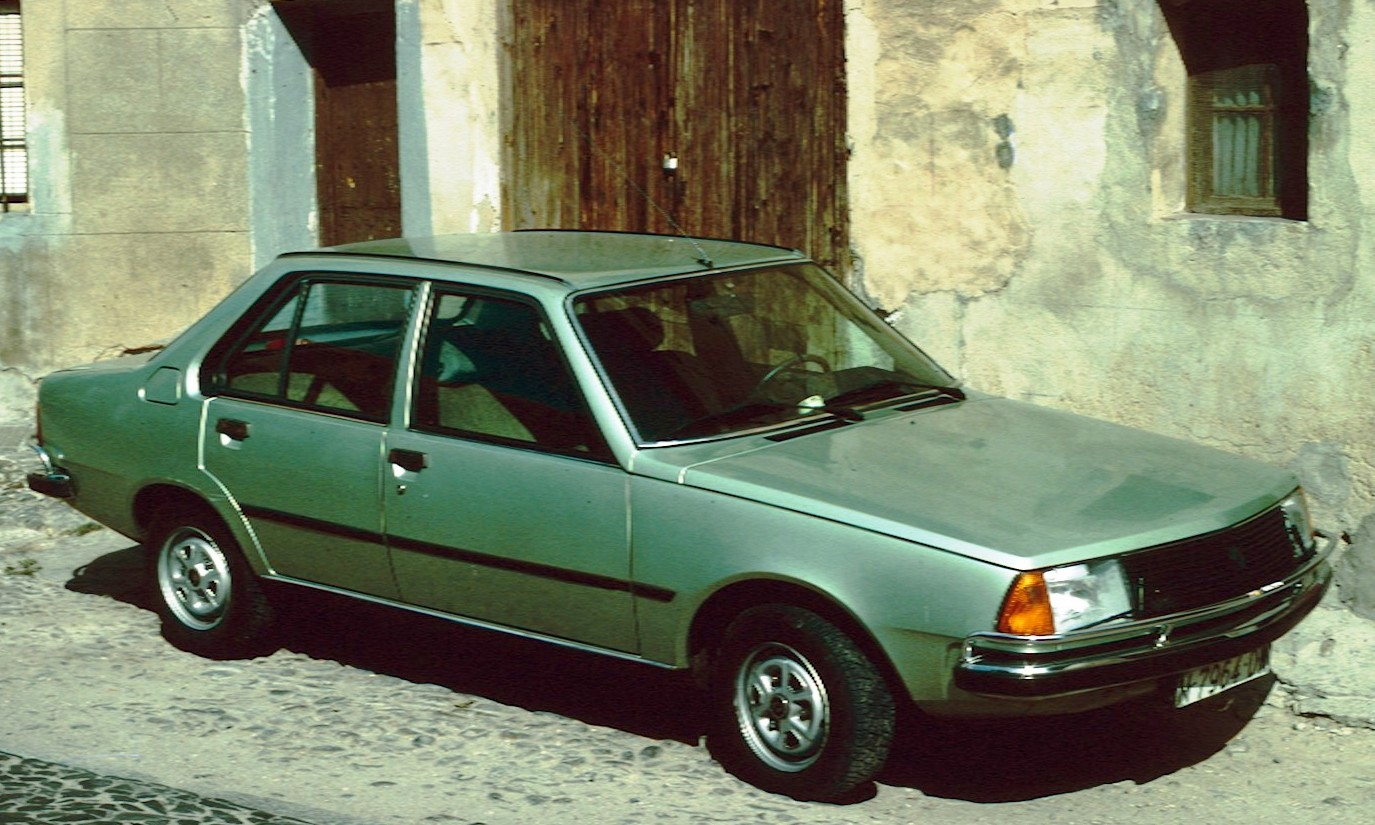
Renault 18 saloon

Although Renault made numerous forays into international markets in countries such as Argentina with the 12, their first true "world car" was their 18, hence the slogan Meeting International Requirements, which (as well as in France) would later be produced in ten other countries and four continents around the world. In 1981, the Renault 18 was selected by India's massive public sector car manufacturing project Maruti Udyog to be built there at a rate of 100,000 cars per year - including a pickup truck version meant to compete with small Japanese trucks. However, after closer review and at the direction of Rajiv Gandhi (who had always wanted to build a small people's car) it was determined that the economics did not make sense and that a smaller, cheaper car would be the better option. Maruti instead linked up with Japanese Suzuki to build the subcompact Alto under license.

== Renault Eve ==
The Renault 18 also formed the basis for the "Renault Eve" research car. This experimental fuel efficient concept car, powered by a 1.1 L engine from the R5, featured a then state-of-the-art microprocessor, an array of specialised sensors, an electronically controlled carburettor, continuously variable automatic transmission, as well as aerodynamics and use of lightweight materials. The resulting body shape resulted in a very low 0.239 Cd drag coefficient. The project was sponsored by the French government.

== Initial range ==
The Renault 18 went into production at Renault's Flins factory in France in December 1977. It was presented at the Geneva Salon in March 1978, with marketing and sales starting the following month.

Initially, the R18 was only available as a four-door saloon, in TL, GTL, TS and GTS trim variations. The TL and GTL were powered by the 1397 cc Renault Cléon petrol engine (which was developed from the 1289 cc engine from the Renault 12), which produced 64 PS (47 kW; 63 hp). Both models had a four-speed gearbox. The TS and GTS were powered by the 1647 cc A-Type engine (which was the same as used in the Renault 17 TS) but without the fuel injection, which lowered the output to 79 PS (58 kW; 78 hp). The TS had a four-speed manual gearbox, while the GTS had a 5-speed manual gearbox, with optional 3-speed electronic automatic transmission available for both models. The automatic versions of the TS and GTS models were called the TS Automatic and GTS Automatic to distinguish them from their manual transmission counterparts. Beginning in 1978, the Renault 18 was also assembled in Romania under the name Dacia 18. Fewer than 100 cars were built by Dacia, mainly for the government. It had been intended as a replacement for the Dacia 1300, a model derived from and based on the Renault 12, but the license and production between Dacia and Renault ended in 1979 and the model was dropped.

The 18 was Renault's first car to use the 1.4 L Cléon engine in the medium-size car sector. The Renault 18 also used three-stud wheels (similar to those of the Citroën 2CV), rather than the four- or five-stud wheels common on most of its contemporaries. In 1980 Turbo and Diesel R18 models came fitted with four-stud wheels (necessitated by using suspension parts and wheels from the larger R20 and Fuego), with all versions using four-stud wheels from the 1983 facelift onwards.

== Timeline ==
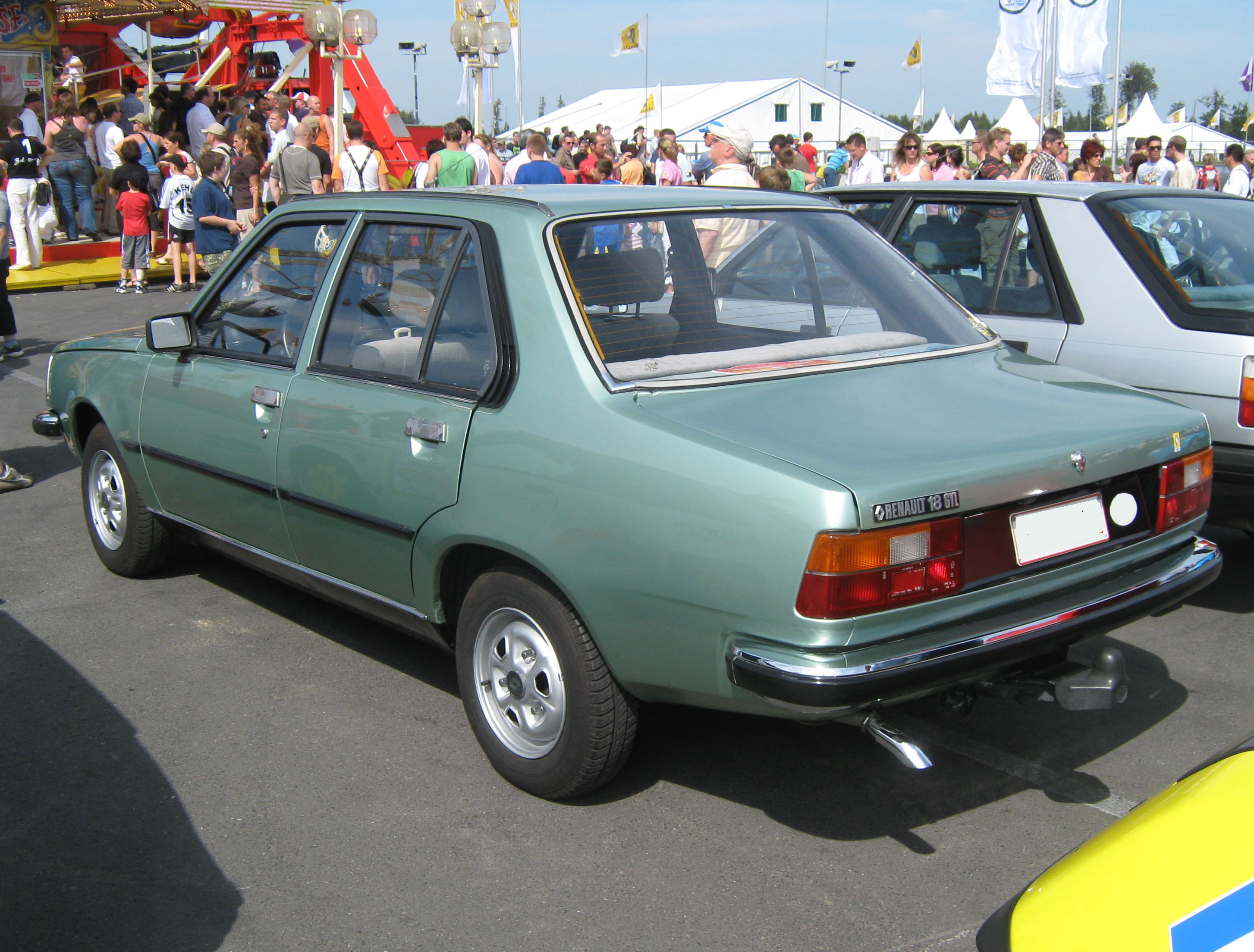
Renault 18 rear

Deliveries began early in April 1978 and sales in the United Kingdom began just before Christmas. On the British market, it was designed to compete with the market-leading Ford Cortina, Morris Marina, Vauxhall Cavalier and Chrysler Alpine – with all of these cars except the Alpine featuring rear-wheel drive. It was initially hugely successful on the UK market, peaking in 1980 as the tenth best-selling car there with over 30,000 sales, but sales declined over the next few years in the face of new British-built competitors in the shape of the Ford Sierra, Vauxhall Cavalier, and Austin Montego.

The first changes were announced for 1979 at the Paris Motor Show in October 1978. Rear-seat belts were now fitted as standard, and a manual choke replaced the automatic one with which the car had been launched. The station wagon as well as a new basic model, called simply the "Renault 18", were introduced. Also new for 1979, the 18 Automatic became a separate model (with GTL trim) rather than simply a transmission option. A year later, all production models were outfitted with a new alternator that included a built-in electronic regulator. In July 1980, the 18 Diesel model was added. This model was mechanically similar to the Renault 20 Diesel, and was equipped with a 2068 cc (126.2 cu in) engine (rated at 49 kW (66 PS)), negative offset front suspension, and larger four-stud wheels. The diesel-engined 18s came in two trim levels: TD and GTD. The basic TD (which was available as both a saloon and estate) had a four-speed gearbox and the equipment level of the TS, while the GTD (which was exclusively available as a saloon) had a five-speed gearbox and an equivalent equipment level as the GTS. Power-assisted steering was optional on the GTD, while a five-speed gearbox was optional on the TD. Diesel model sales never reached thirty percent of the overall annual production.

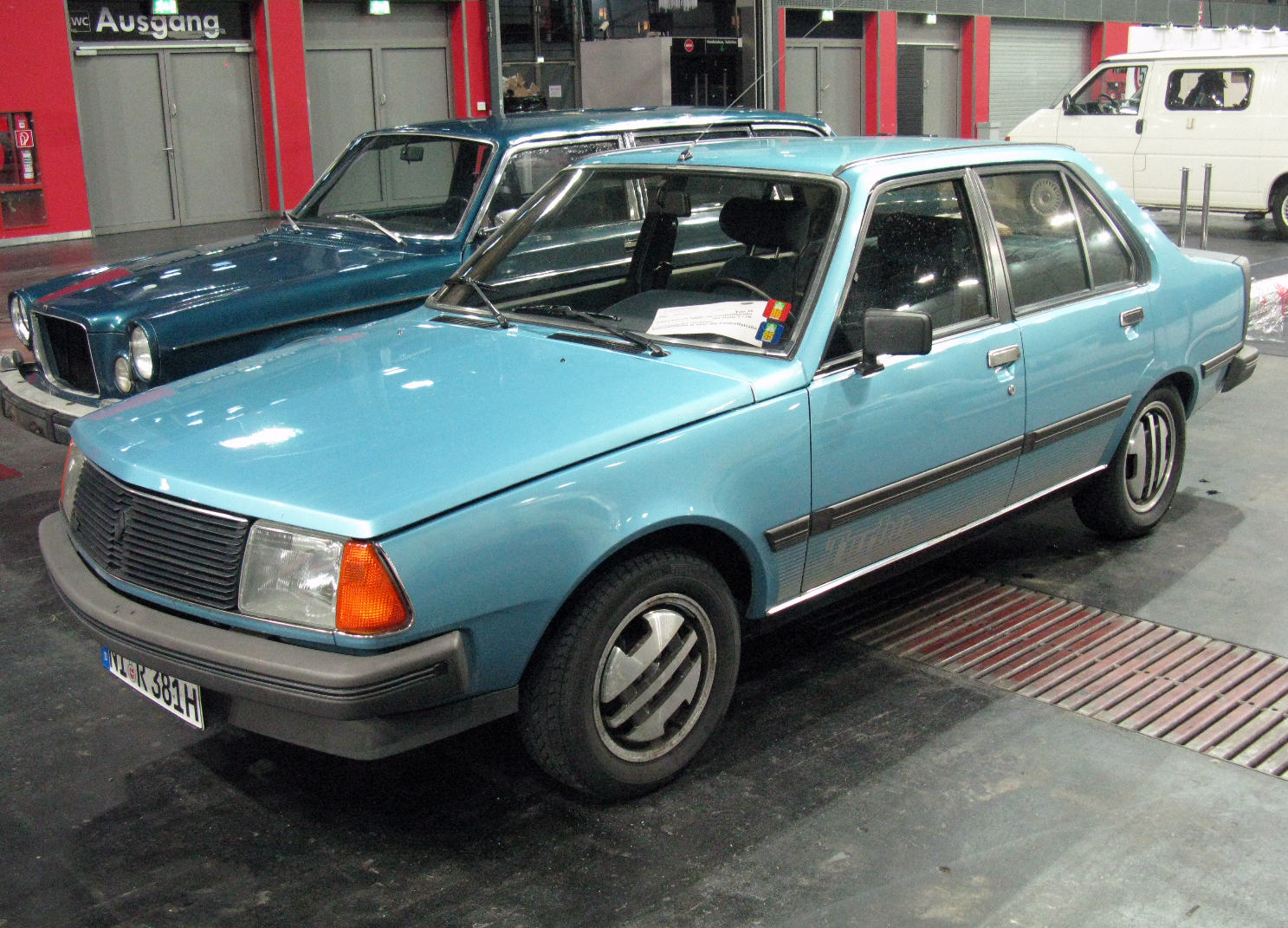
1981 Renault 18 Turbo

The 18 Turbo model was introduced in September 1980, borrowing from other Renault models. The 18 Turbo featured a 1565 cc (95.5 cu in) engine rated at 110 PS (81 kW) and 134 lb⋅ft (182 N⋅m) of torque with a claimed top speed of 115 mph (185 km/h) (between 112 mph (180 km/h) and 116 mph (186.5 km/h) in period tests), with reviewers in period achieving 0-60 mph (97 km/h) times between 10.1 and 10.8 seconds. Features included a five-speed gearbox, negative offset front suspension, four-stud alloy wheels, rear spoiler, dashboard and interior fittings from the Renault Fuego. A little later, a Turbodiesel version arrived; it had an 88 PS (65 kW) version of the 2.1 L inline-four fitted to the TD/GTD and at the time it was the fastest car in its class. However, it soon had to compete with newer and quicker performance versions of the Vauxhall Cavalier (Opel Ascona) and Ford Sierra.

Model year 1982 saw the introduction of several changes to the entire lineup of 18 models, shown in late 1981: the negative offset front suspension, previously available only on the Turbo and Diesel models, was made standard. The front indicator lenses were changed from orange to clear, bumpers and door handles were switched from chrome to black polyester, and the seats were restyled to provide more space in the rear seats. Model-specific changes included the available option of a five-speed gearbox on the TL; the GTL received an "economy-tune" 73 PS (54 kW) version of the 1647 cc (100.5 cu in) engine, as well as a five-speed gearbox, higher final drive ratio, electronic ignition and an "economizer" gauge. The TS and GTS version were discontinued. A two-litre model entered production, for export only until late 1983.

A special edition, the R18 "American" arrived in 1983. Limited to 5,200 examples (1,500 in the UK), it had a special black over silver two-tone paint and numerous luxury equipment such as alloy road wheels and a plusher interior. It included the 1.6 L engine and sold well. An "American 2" version was introduced in 1984. Included were central locking, radio, and a choice of four colour schemes, with a total of 14,000 units (8,000 for France and 6,000 for the rest of Europe).

The "Type 2" was introduced in April 1984. The grille was changed and all models gained a front air dam, while the saloons also received a standard rear spoiler. The three-stud wheel rims were replaced with the larger four-stud wheel rims (with the Base, TL, and TD just having center caps, and the GTL, Automatic, GTS, and GTD all having full wheel trims). The biggest difference was that the dashboard was replaced by that of the Fuego. The 2 L GTX model was introduced in France in the fall of 1983. Subsequent years saw fewer changes to the 18 line, in preparation for the launch of the Renault 21 early in 1986. For 1986, a limited range was sold as the "18 Gala" in France, with the Turbo model discontinued during 1985 (only about 650 Turbos were built that year). July 1986 marked the end for the R18 in France. Production continued in Latin America until 1994, however, and the R18 also continued to be manufactured in France with the 2 L petrol engine until 1989 for export only.

== Estate model ==
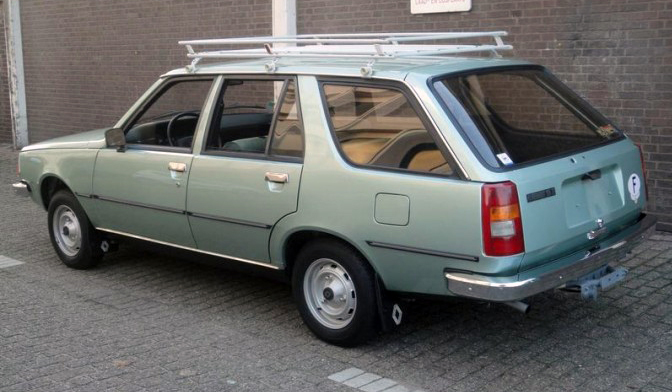
1980 Renault 18 TL Break

By the late 1970s, European production of the Renault 12 was being gradually wound down, followed by the arrival of the estate versions of the Renault 18 on 1 March 1979. The R18 Estate ("Break" in French-speaking countries, Argentina, and some other markets) was only available in TL, LS, and TS model variations, except in Australia where all Australian-assembled Renault 18s, sedans and station wagons, were GTS. The station wagons provided comfortable seating for five, as well as featuring a folding rear bench seat that offered up to 65.5 cubic feet (1.85 m^{3}) of cargo area with a 5.5-foot-long (1.68 m) flat floor and this carrying capacity was assisted by variable rate rear coil springs with long travel shock absorbers.

They were otherwise mechanically identical to their saloon counterparts. The estates were identical to the saloons in equipment, except that the TS estate additionally featured shock-absorbent bumpers, door mouldings, and front seat head restraints from the 18 GTL saloon. The estate proved almost as popular as the saloon.

In Germany the Break was originally marketed as the "Variable", after the Type 2 facelift it became the "Combi". In the Netherlands, it was called the "Stationcar", while it was sold as the "Familiar" in Spain. In the United States, it was marketed as the "Sportswagon", later becoming the "Sportwagon" without the "s".

In January 1983, the 18 Break also became available in a 4x4 version, which could be had with the 1.6 (Phase 2: 2.0 as well) petrol engine and the 2.1 diesel. It was mainly sold in European countries with mountainous and/or winter driving conditions that would benefit from four-wheel drive.

== U.S. and Canadian market ==
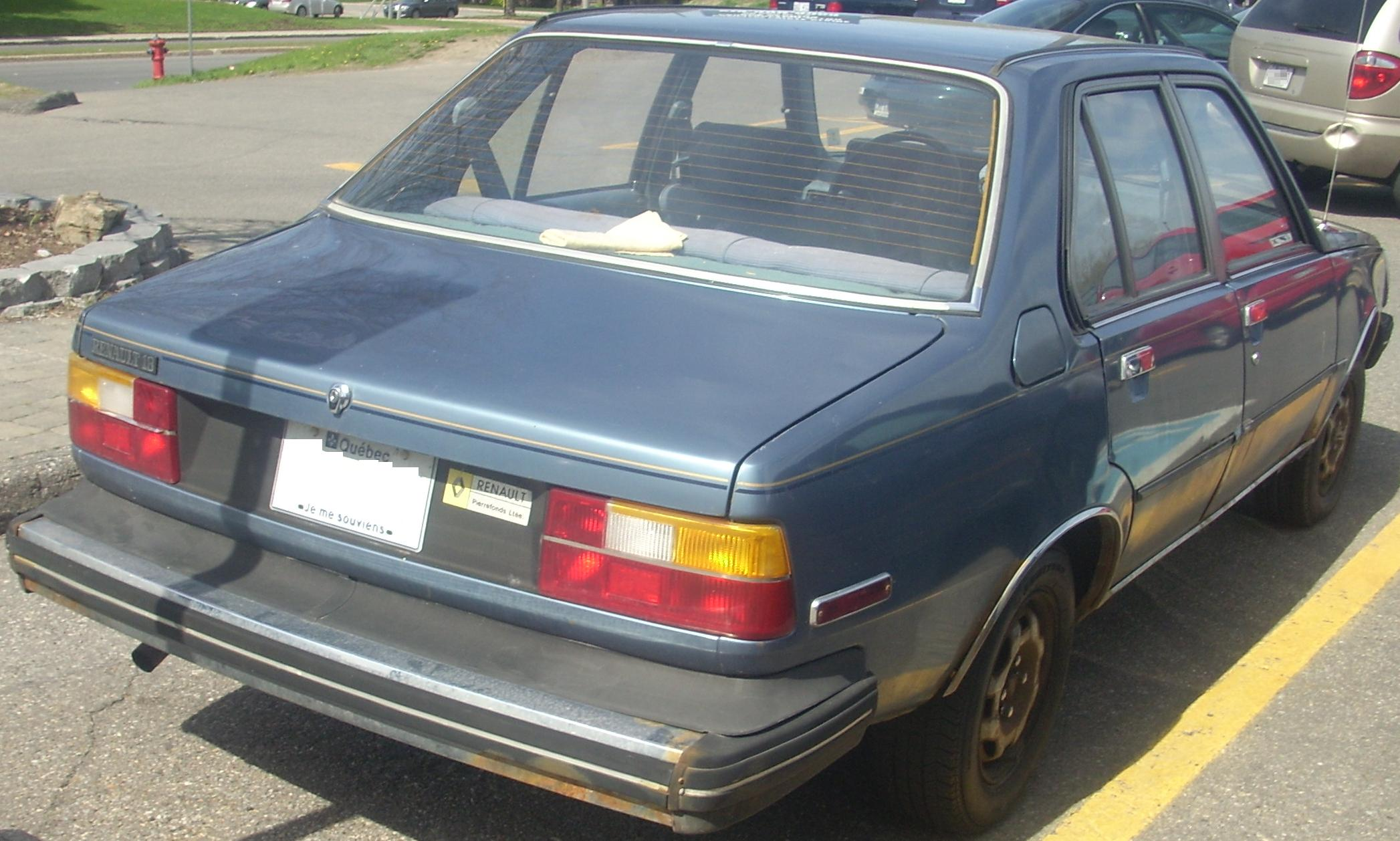
Renault 18i (Canada)

American Motors Corporation (AMC) had established several assembly and marketing agreements with Renault since the 1960s. A financial partnership in 1979 evolved into the French firm's holding a controlling (46 percent) stake in the smallest U.S. automaker. One aspect of AMC's strategy included marketing a larger-sized front-wheel-drive automobile.

The Renault 18 was re-engineered for the U.S. and Canadian markets. Modifications for the U.S. market included more stringent emissions controls, larger bumpers designed to withstand 5-mile-per-hour (8 km/h) impacts, two-tone paint, and uncovered sealed-beam headlights, as well as different hubcaps and interior trim. The US and Canadian version of the 18 was the first Renault about which critics claimed the Frenchness had been taken out. The add-ons increased the 18i sedan's wind resistance to drag coefficient of Cd=0.44.

Being fuel injected, the four-door and the station wagon (called "Sportswagon"; the middle "s" was later dropped) were sold by AMC dealers as the Renault 18i beginning with the 1981 model year. The sedan was discontinued during 1983 and the remaining station wagon body style was renamed simply the Sportwagon from 1984, remaining on sale until 1986. The majority of sales during 1986 were leftover 1985 models.

The 18i was sold in base or deluxe trims, with the well appointed deluxe receiving a different "high line" dash and a leather upholstered "touring" interior. A four- or a five-speed manual was available, or a three-speed automatic. When introduced, the fuel injected (Bosch L-Jetronic), 1647 cc straight-four offered 82 hp (61 kW) at 5500 rpm in federalized trim. Fuel economy figures for 1982 were 38 mpg_{‑US} (6.2 L/100 km; 46 mpg_{‑imp}) highway and 25 mpg_{‑US} (9.4 L/100 km; 30 mpg_{‑imp}) in the city. The American versions were also considerably longer, thanks to the larger bumpers, at 178.7 in (4540 mm) for the sedan and 181.5 in (4610 mm) for the wagon. Renault had planned on bringing in the 2.1-liter diesel engine for the 18i, but after the implosion of the United States diesel market in the early 1980s this was cancelled.

For 1983, the 18i received various upgrades while the base trim was dropped, leaving only the well equipped deluxe version. The three-wand setup was replaced by a more traditional two-stalk solution for operating lights, wipers, and indicators. Either a five-speed manual or three-speed automatic were on offer; the four-speed was no longer available after 1982. Period reviewers also commented on an improved quality feel vis-à-vis earlier model years. Nonetheless, the 1983 was the last year for the sedan and sales of the Sportwagon dropped steadily until 1986. Along with the name change, the 1.6 was replaced by the larger 2.2-liter engine also known from the Fuego for the Sportwagon. These feature prominent "2.2 litres" badging on the rear hatch and were available in Deluxe or Touring trim. The Deluxe has aerodynamic hubcaps while the sporty Touring has alloy wheels and the 18 Turbo's contrasting graphics along tha flanks. Maximum power for the larger engine was up to 91 hp (68 kW) at 5000 rpm, while transmissions remained as before.

For the 1988 model year, the Sportwagon was replaced by the Renault 21's US and Canadian equivalent, the Eagle Medallion.

== Assembly in Australia ==
Starting in 1980, the top-of-the-line Renault 18 GTS saloons and estates with right-hand drive were assembled in Heidelberg, Australia by Renault Australia from CKD (Completely Knocked Down) kits imported from France.

== South American markets ==
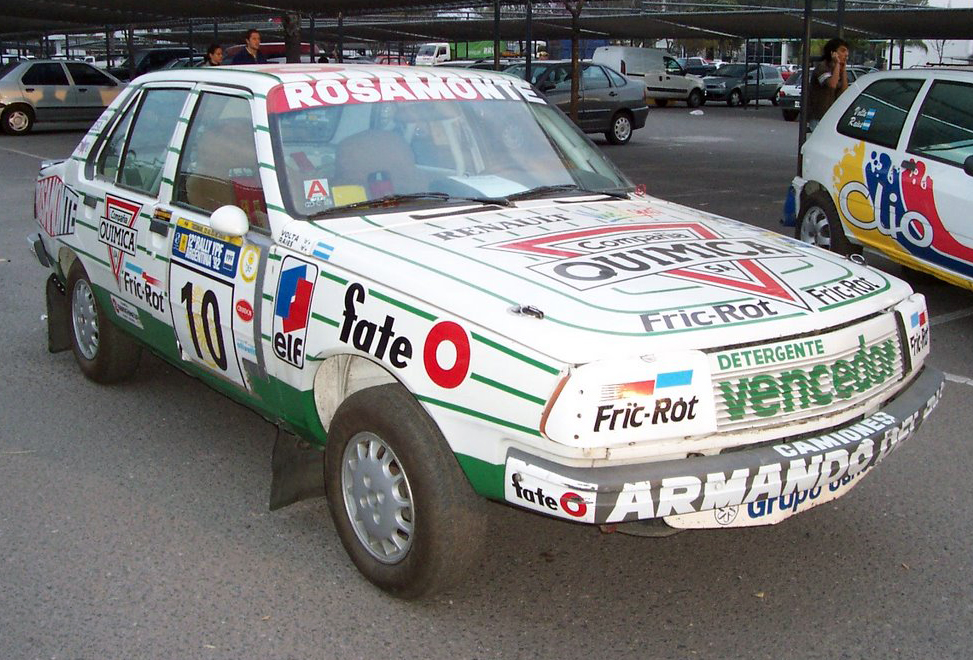
This Renault 18 GTX finished seventh overall in the 1992 Rally YPF Argentina

The Renault 18 was also built in Argentina, Colombia, Uruguay, and Venezuela, with some locally developed differences such as a larger, more powerful engine. The TX was the initial 1981 model, featuring the Douvrin 2.0 L four-cylinder powerplant with 99 hp (73 kW), a first for a production 18 worldwide. There was a need for a powerful car to replace the Renault Torino luxury-sports range in those markets.

During 1982 the GTX was added to the lineup, featuring a fifth gear, air conditioning, and an engine upgraded to produce 103 hp (76 kW). Towards the end of 1982 the 18 Break entered local production, in either TX or GTX trim, and the lower cost GTL sedan was added to the lineup. This model received the 1.4-litre engine familiar from the European market, producing 77 hp (57 kW), and a five-speed transmission. Later, there was also the GTX-II, featuring a basic onboard computer that displayed fuel consumption, etc. It was also available with 1.6 L (TL), 2.0 L, and 2.1 L diesel engines. For 1993 only, a 110 hp (81 kW) 2.2 L engine was installed in the GTX-II.

The Renault 18 was assembled in Colombia by SOFASA until 1987. In Uruguay, production began in 1982 and lasted until 1994. The Uruguayan cars had Argentinian bodies and engines imported from France. Venezuelan assembly was carried out by C.A. Venezolana Producción Renault (CAVPR) in a brand new factory in Mariara. It was built there from 1980 until late 1987, with the 1.4 (TL break), 1.6 (GTS sedan), or 2-litre (GTX sedan/break) petrol fours. After local production ended, an imported 2.2-litre version called the Super GTX was available until replaced by the Renault 21 in 1989.

The Renault 18 GTX was also rallied in South America by Renault Argentina, following the various competition successes of the earlier 12 TS.

== Trim levels ==
Index name	Production years	Engine size	Notes
Renault 18 TL	1978–1986	1397 cc	Specification includes: Two-speed wipers Intermittent screen wipe Electric screen washers Volt meter Engine coolant temperature gauge Fuel gauge Six-figure mileage recorder Trip recorder Handbrake warning light Defective front brake discs warning light Day/night position for interior rear view mirror Rheostat for adjusting brightness of dashboard lights Illuminated ashtray, heater panel, boot and glove box Heated rear screen Anti-dazzle headlight adjustment Adjustment for direction of headlight beam Cigarette lighter Driver's side sun visor Passenger's side sun visor Vanity mirror in passenger's side sun visor Full carpeting Cloth upholstery Front armrests with grab handles Rear armrests Ashtrays in the rear doors Childproof rear door locks Passenger's side interior courtesy light Front door pockets Center console incorporating coin tray Reclining front seats Loudspeakers in front doors
Renault 18 GTL	1978–1986	1397 cc (1978–1982); 1647 cc (1982–1986)	Specification of TL plus: Foam-filled steering wheel H4 iodine headlights Quartz clock Velour upholstery Styled wheels Driver's side interior courtesy light Map reading light for front seat passenger Remote-adjustable driver's side door mirror Rear fog lights Headlight wash/wipe system Pre-installation radio equipment Shock absorbent bumpers Adjustable front seat head restraints Black rubber protective side mouldings
Renault 18 LS	1979–1981	1647 cc	Specification of TL, but sport-oriented
Renault 18 TS	1978–1982	1647 cc	Specification of TL, plus: Foam-filled steering wheel H4 iodine headlights Quartz clock Velour upholstery Styled wheels Driver's side interior courtesy light Map reading light for front seat passenger
Renault 18 GTS	1978–1983	1647 cc	Specification of GTL, plus: Electric front windows Central locking
Renault 18 TD	1980–1985	2068 cc Diesel	TL trim level with diesel engine, 2.1-litre
Renault 18 GTD	1980–1986	2068 cc Diesel	GTS trim level with diesel engine, 2.1-litre

== Legacy ==
A total of 2,028,964 Renault 18s were built in France alone. The R18 was replaced by the Renault 21 saloon and Nevada/Savana estate starting in 1986. The U.S. market successor for 1987 was the Eagle Medallion. An additional 268,484 examples were built in two of FASA's plants in Spain, in Palencia and Valladolid. The Renault 18 was withdrawn from the remaining European markets by 1989. It remained in production in South America into the mid-1990s. The last Argentinian Renault 18 rolled off the production line in 1993, after a total of 132,956 units were built in Argentina alone.

It was launched on the British market in December 1978 but was discontinued there in July 1986. Sales were initially strong, peaking at over 30,000 in 1980 when it was the tenth best-selling car in the UK and the most popular foreign model; but declined over the next few years as new competitors arrived from Ford, Vauxhall, and British Leyland. In total, 131,241 examples were officially imported.
