= Renault 9 and 11 =

Renault 9 / 11
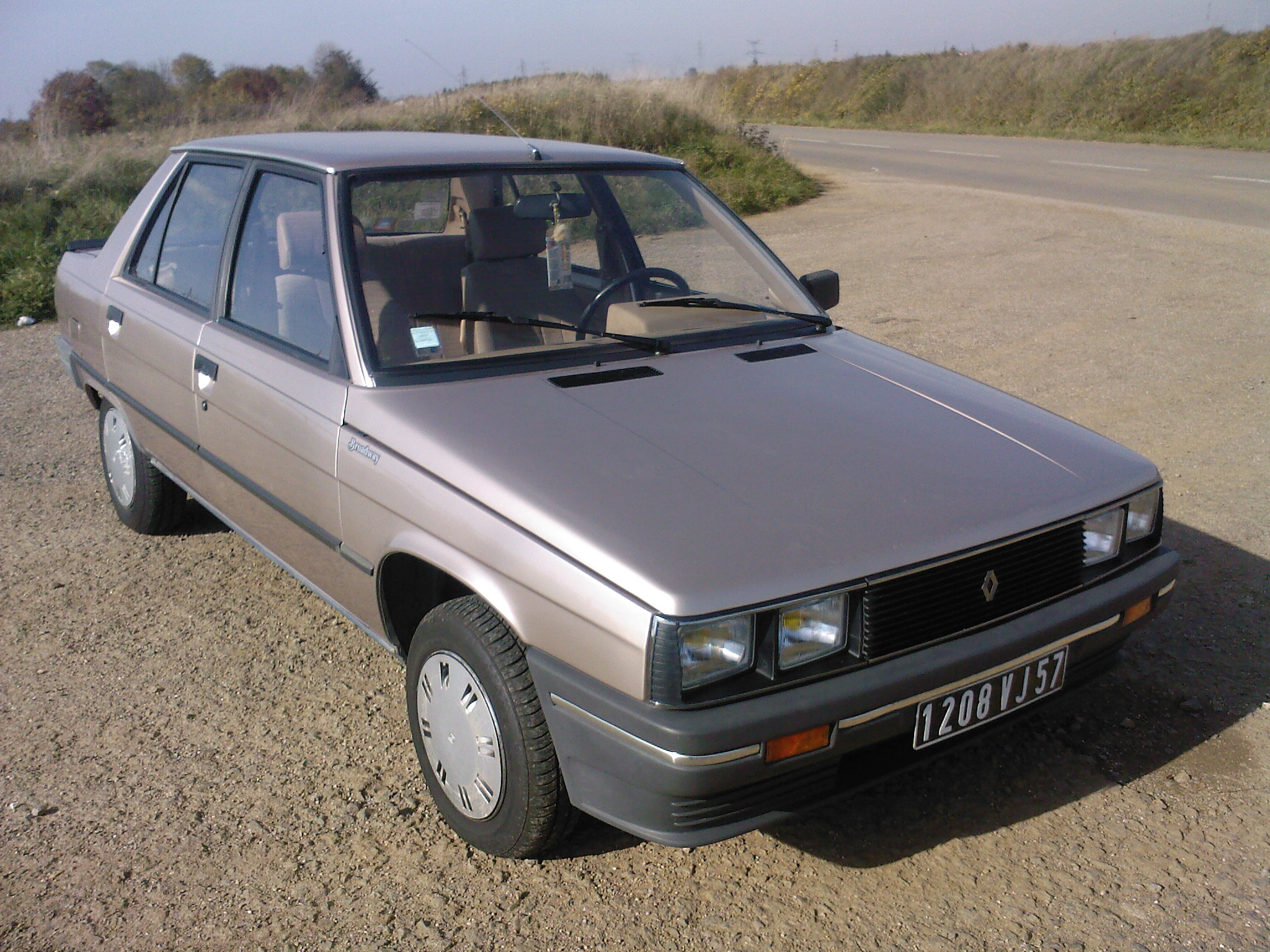
- Phase 1 Renault 9

Overview
- Manufacturer: Renault
- Also called: Renault Luxmore (Taiwan)
- Production: 1981–1989 (France); 1983–1987 (United States); 1983–1996 (Taiwan); 1984–1997 (Argentina); 1983–1999 (Colombia); 1985–2000 (Turkey)
- Assembly: France: Douai; Argentina: Santa Isabel (Renault Argentina); Chile: Los Andes (Cormecánica); Colombia: Envigado (SOFASA); Mexico: Vallejo; Spain: Valladolid (FASA-Renault); Taiwan: Taichung (Sanfu Motors); Turkey: Bursa (Oyak-Renault); United States: Kenosha (AMC); Yugoslavia: Novo Mesto (IMV)
- Designer: Robert Opron

Body and chassis
- Class: Small family car (C)
- Body style: 3/5-door liftback; 2-door saloon (United States only); 4-door saloon; 2-door convertible (United States only)
- Layout: Front-engine, front-wheel drive
- Related: Renault Alliance; Renault Encore

Chronology
- Predecessor: Renault 14
- Successor: Renault 19

The Renault 9 and Renault 11 are small family cars produced by the French manufacturer Renault from 1981 to 1989 in saloon (Renault 9) and hatchback (Renault 11) configurations — both were styled by the French automobile designer, Robert Opron.

Variants were manufactured by American Motors Corporation (AMC), as the Renault Alliance and Renault Encore for the North American market. The car was produced in Turkey until the year 2000.

The models use a transverse front-wheel drive engine configuration, and feature four wheel independent suspension. They were chosen as the European Car of the Year in 1982, as well as the Car of the Year by Motor Trend and one of the 10Best by Car and Driver in 1983.

== Phases ==
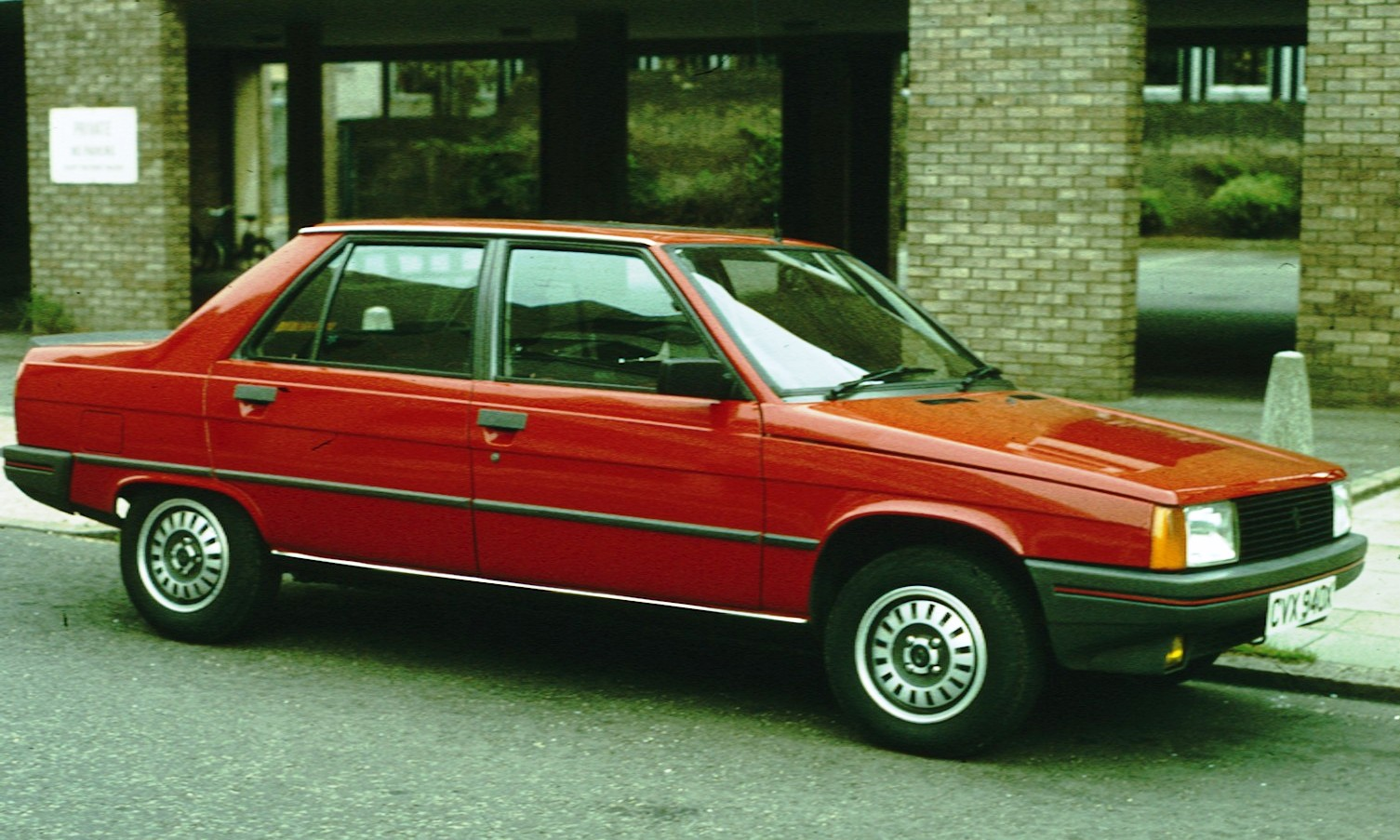
Renault 9 (phase 1)

There were three facelifts given to the Renault 9 and two facelifts to the Renault 11 during their production runs. When released in 1983, the Renault 11 was equipped with double headlights, different from the Renault 9. In 1985, the Renault 9 was given a facelift, giving it the same front look and double headlights as the Renault 11 but only in GTS, GTD, TSE, TDE, TXE, and GTX levels. The lower end C, TC, GTC, TL, GTL, and TD models retained the phase 1 front. The later Renault 9 Broadway series also had the 4 headlight front of the phase 1 Renault 11. The more aerodynamic Phase 2 appeared in 1987 and the 9 and 11 now only differed at the rear of the cars.

Finally, the Phase 3, which was not sold in most of Europe, was released in Turkey in 1997. This final revision had more rounded head and tail lights, as well as ovoid body cladding around the bumpers and boot lid, which aimed to give the car a more modern look. The front design was originally developed for the 1993 facelift model assembled in Taiwan under the name "Renault Luxmore." These later Turkish-made cars carried a "Broadway" badge as well as the Renault 9 designation, but note that "Broadway" had already been used on special editions of the earlier phase models.

== Overview ==
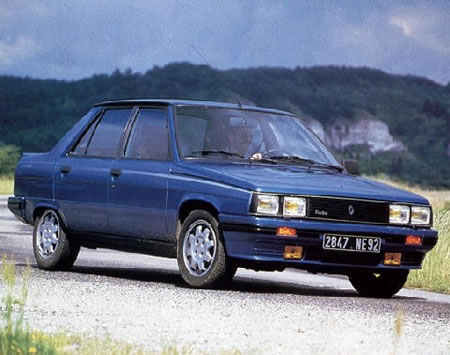
Renault 9 Turbo (phase 1 facelift)

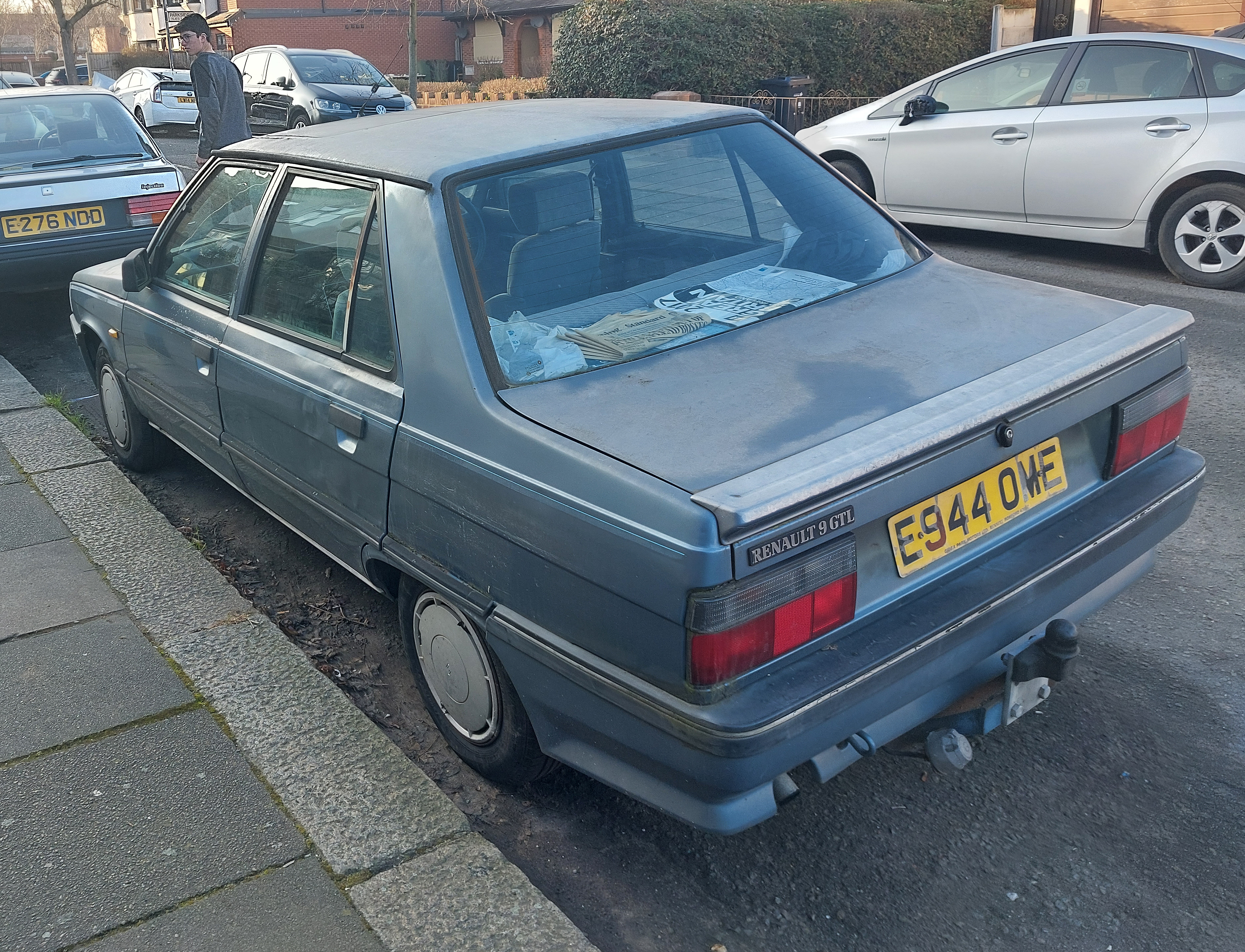
Renault 9 phase 2, rear

The Renault 9 was introduced in October 1981 as a four-door saloon (in right-hand drive form for the UK market in March 1982). Marketing of the 11 started at the beginning of 1983 (in the UK from June that year) as a three- or five-door hatchback.

Both models originated under the Renault code name L42 and were designed by Robert Opron. The development of the Renault 9 in 1977, as a "four metre" model (referring to its length), aimed to position it between the Renault 5 and the Renault 14.

Opron developed a traditional three box design to appeal to more conventional customers and avoid the poor reception that had met the Renault 14's styling. Exhaustive consumer studies suggested that buyers rejected innovation, resulting in a rather nondescript design, albeit of modest elegance. The roofline was also taller than that of many competitors, providing ample interior space. The C and TC featured 1.1 L engines, while the TL, GTL, and TLE received 1.4 L engines producing 60 PS (44 kW). The GTS and TSE received 72 PS (53 kW) versions of the 1.4 L engine.

Before the two models entered mass production, Renault had assigned more than 500 employees to the L42 project, logging 14.5 million hours of study and testing, constructing 44 prototypes, testing 130 engines, and test-driving prototypes over 2,200,000 kilometres (1,367,017 mi).

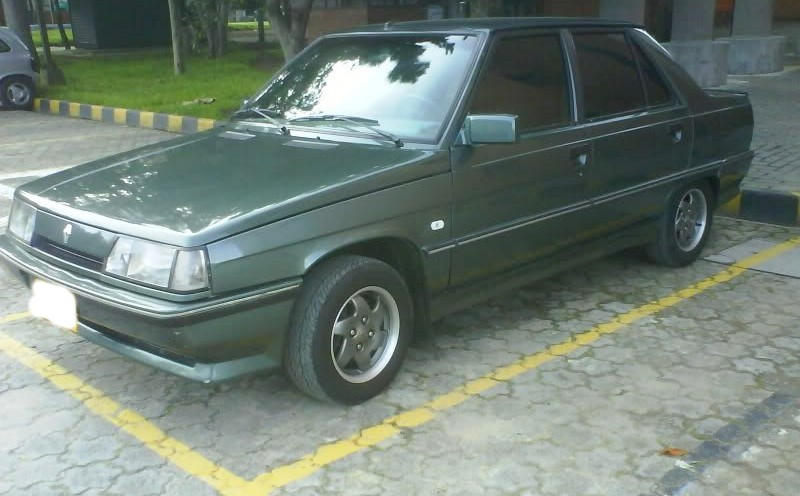
Renault 9 second facelift (phase 2)

Both cars were also more conservatively engineered, although they retained front wheel drive, Renault abandoned the Douvrin (or "Suitcase") transmission in the sump engine, which it had shared with Peugeot-Citroën in the Renault 14, in favour of its in-house power unit – the venerable C-type "Cléon" engine with an end-on mounted transmission. This mechanical layout, along with the 9/11's suspension design, was to become the basis of all small Renaults for approximately the next 15 years.

The Renault 9 was awarded the 1982 European Car of the Year, while the U.S.-built Alliance version of the 11 appeared on Car and Driver's Ten Best list for 1983 and was selected as the 1983 Motor Trend Car of the Year.

The well-equipped Renault 11 TSE Electronic of 1983 was the first car in its class to have a synthetically voiced trip computer, but only because Renault moved up its launch date by a few days to get ahead of Austin's Maestro Vanden Plas.

Although the 9 and 11 cars had different names and body styles, they were identical under the skin and were intended to jointly replace the older Renault 14. The 11 was also distinguishable from the 9 by its front end, which featured square twin headlights that had been introduced on the North American Alliance version. The 9 also received this new front end in late 1985 for the 1986 model year.

The 11 deliberately aped the styling of its larger brother launched almost at the same time - the executive Renault 25 (also styled by Robert Opron) - featuring the signature wraparound rear window and the dramatic hooded dashboard design, which had the option of an 'Electronique' trim level which featured a digital instrument cluster and a voice synthesis trip computer - similar to those on the 25. The 9, by contrast had a simpler and more conservative looking dashboard and the digital instruments were never available. Both models were facelifted one more time for the European market (Phase 2) with matching nose and interior upgrades for the model year of 1987. At the Brussels Motor Show in January 1985 Renault showed the 11 Société, a light commercial version of the three-door hatchback with a cargo platform replacing the rear seat.

A version of the 9 was manufactured and marketed by American Motors Corporation (AMC) in the United States as the Renault Alliance and bearing a small AMC badge. With 623,573 examples manufactured for the 1982 to 1987 model years, AMC offered the Alliance as a four-door sedan, two-door sedan (with higher rear wheel arches than the four door) and as a convertible, beginning in 1984.

The Renault 9 and 11 continued in production in France until 1989, a year after the launch of the Renault 19. However, production continued in other countries, with the end finally coming after nearly twenty years when production in Turkey was discontinued in the year 2000.

=== Competition ===
The Renault 11 Turbo was used extensively by Renault Sport for their Group A car in the 1987 World Rally Championship. Frenchman Alain Oreille managed a Group N victory in the 1985 Rallye Monte Carlo, followed by the Group A victory in 1986 (enough for an eighth finish overall). A Renault 11 Turbo was, however, piloted to a second and a third-place finish in the 1987 Portuguese Rally and San Remo Rally respectively with Jean Ragnotti in the driver's seat. The 11 Turbo also won the national Polish Rally Championship in 1985 and 1988, and both the Swiss and Portuguese rally championships in 1987. Its last result of importance was Oreille's fourth place overall in the 1988 Rallye Monte Carlo.

== Engines ==
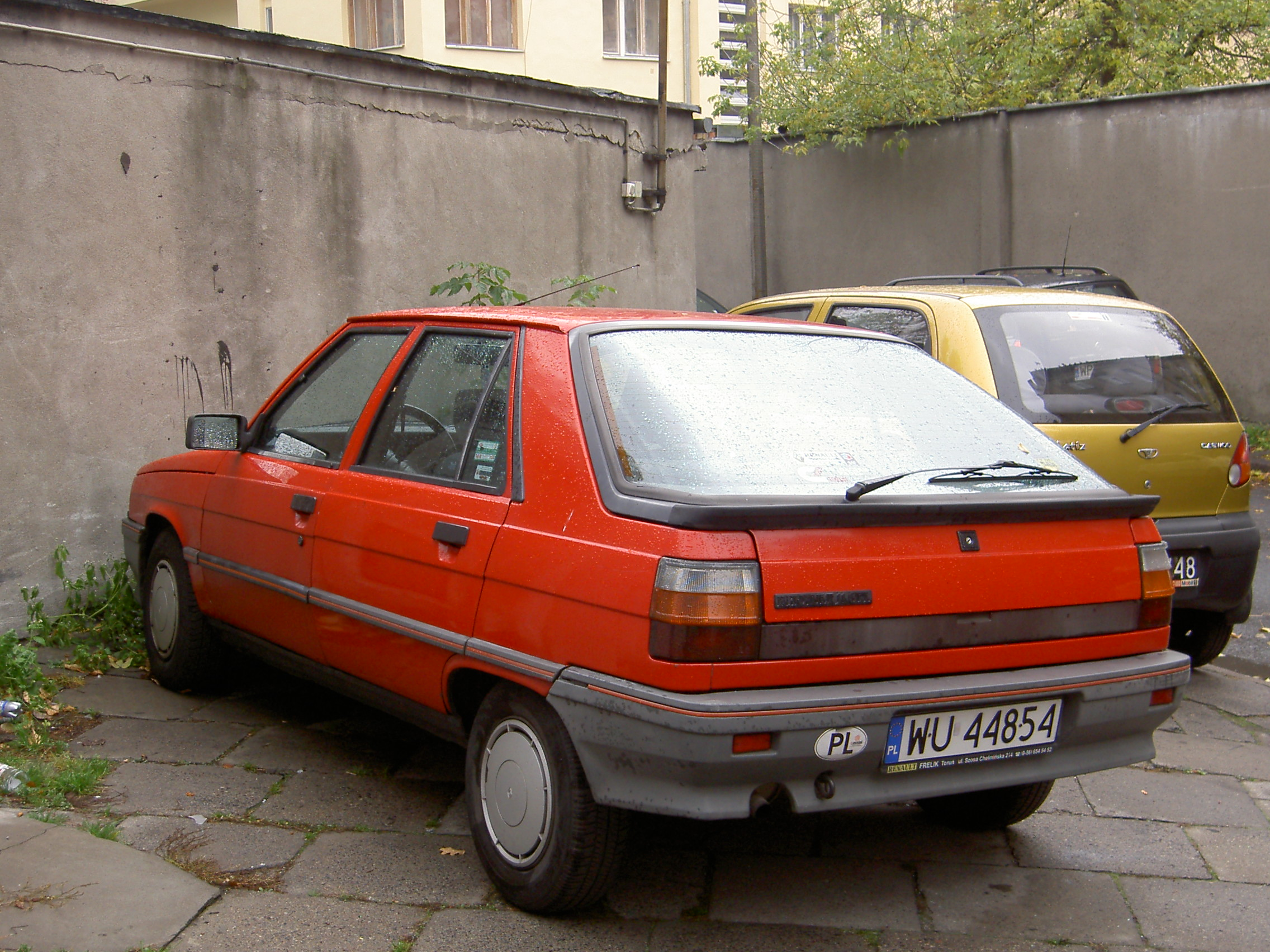
Rear view of the Renault 11

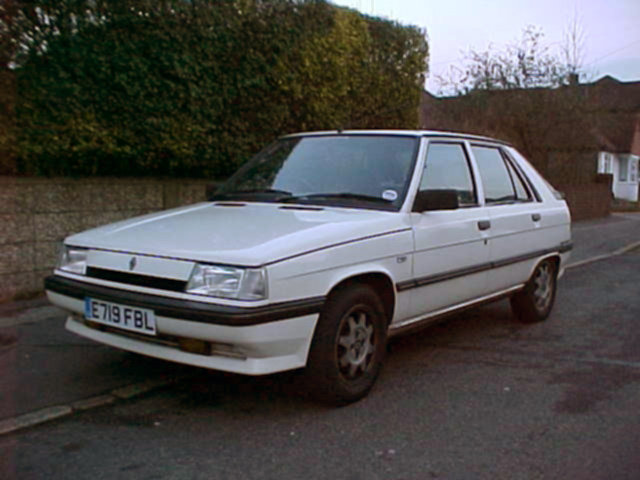
Phase 2 Renault 11 GTL (with Turbo alloys)

At launch, both cars used Renault's ageing Cléon-Fonte overhead valve engines in either 1.1 or 1.4 litre format, and a basic suspension design which won few plaudits for the driving experience. The exceptions were the 9 Turbo and the 11 Turbo hot hatch, which used the turbocharged engine from the Renault 5.

The C1E 1.1 litre engine was available only on the Renault 9 and for the three-door body of the R11. The five-door Renault 11 TC and GTC became available with the C1G 1.2 litre engine in 1985. The C1E was phased out from phase 2, leaving the C1G the smallest engine for the 9/11.

The 11 Turbo was introduced first, originally only with three-door bodywork. Compared to the 5 Turbo and the 205 GTi, the 11 Turbo had a more comfort oriented focus. Although the cars were heavier than the Renault 5, the increased power in later models was enough to ensure higher performance, thanks to its 115 PS (85 kW; 113 hp). The rally tuned version was impressively fast, producing up to 220 PS (162 kW; 217 hp).

The newer F type engine which had been developed in collaboration with Volvo appeared from the end of 1983 on in twin carburetted 1,721 cc guise (F2N), powering the upmarket GTX, GTE, TXE, and TXE Electronic (Electronique in France) versions. These larger engined versions were specifically developed with American needs in mind, although they also happened to be well suited for a changing European market.

Later iterations also received fuel injected engines. The Alliance and Encore, while comparatively underpowered, had a definite advantage in ride and handling against other small cars available in America at the time and even had their own SCCA spec racing series, the Alliance Cup.

=== Line-up ===
- C, TC – 1.1 L – 1,108 cc; 48 PS (35 kW)
- GTC – 1.2 L – 1,237 cc; 55 PS (40 kW)
- TL, GTL, TLE – 1.4 L – 1,397 cc; 60 PS (44 kW)
- GTL – 1.4 L – 1,397 cc; 68 PS (50 kW)
- GTS, TSE – 1.4 L – 1,397 cc; 72 PS (53 kW)
- TX - 1.7 L – 1,721 cc; 75 PS (55 kW)
- TXE – 1.7 L – 1,721 cc; 82 PS (60 kW)
- GTX – 1.7 L – 1,721 cc; 90 PS (66 kW)
- GTE – 1.7 L – 1,721 cc; 95 PS (70 kW)
- Turbo – 1.4 L – 1,397 cc; 105 or 115 PS (77 or 85 kW)
- TD, GTD, TDE – 1.6 L – 1,595 cc; 55 PS (40 kW)

== Different versions around the world ==
=== Argentina ===
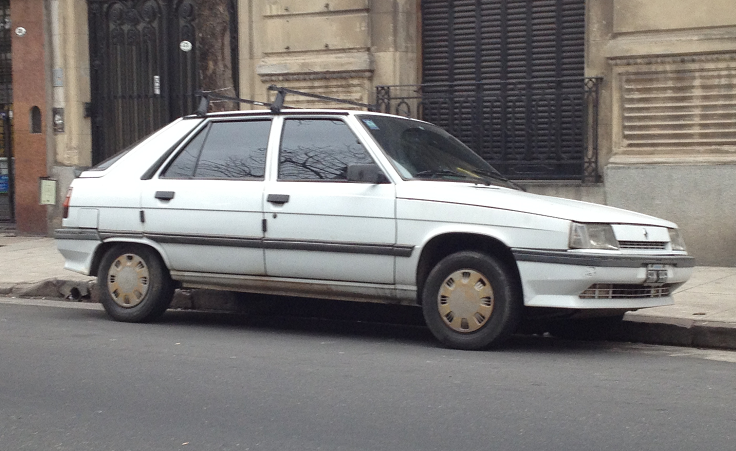
Renault 11 in Argentina, built in Córdoba

The Renault 11 was manufactured between October 1984 and December 1994 in Renault Argentina's Santa Isabel plant with the following trim levels: GTL, RL, RN, TR, TS, TSE, TXE with the 1.4 M1400 engine by Renault Argentina and after by CIADEA. Manufacture of the Renault 9 began in 1987 until 1997 in the same versions and engines, plus the 1.6 like the R11 and according to ADEFA 144,262 vehicles made (R9) and 79,037 (R11). Today, the R9 is a very popular car in the country; in the small and the big cities.

All versions of the R11 and R9 manufactured in Argentina, as well as in Colombia and Turkey, suffered the problems that the material with which the dashboard is made degraded with ultraviolet rays, and ends cracking (especially on the right side, since it doesn't have the steering column that supports it).

=== Colombia ===
SOFASA started manufacturing the Renault 9 in 1983, launching the version GTL with 1400 cc and 60 PS (44 kW; 59 hp). This model's engine capacity was reduced to 1300 cc and became the entry model when the better equipped GTS (1400 cc) was launched in 1985.

The next European facelifted versions of the Renault 9 in the country were known as the Gama 2. In 1987, the TL (1300 cc) was introduced followed by the more advanced TSE 1.3 and GTX 1.4 in 1988. The latter featured front power windows, a spoiler, and a better interior. The new top of the range TXE was launched in 1989, and introduced updated front lights, power mirrors and the TIR – An infrared remote control to operate the locks. In 1990, SOFASA marketed a 50 vehicle, 50th special edition Prestige with leather seats and alloy rims.

In 1992, these versions ceased production and three models were introduced: The basic Brío (1.3 L), the mid range Súper (1.3 L) and the Máximo (1.6 L). In 1995, the Brío was renamed Brío RN, so it could be differentiated from the more sophisticated Brío RT. A more powerful variant of the RT was called Óptimo.

By the middle of 1996, SOFASA decided to experiment a much more flexible way to offer cars to the market. Called R9 Personnalité, the idea allowed customers to choose from different engines and accessories so they could assemble the car they wanted within their budget. This was possible through special software in dealerships. A year later, a facelifted version featured fuel injection, assisted steering, and a completely new interior.

After 16 years of production, the Renault 9 was discontinued in Colombia, and was replaced by the Renault 19 and the Renault Mégane. It became the quintessential family car in Colombia, reaching over 115,000 units built and sold between 1983 and 1999, a record in the automotive Colombian history up to that time.

=== Taiwan ===
Sanfu Motors in Taiwan assembled the Renault 9 from 1983 until 1996. An automatic-equipped version became available in January 1985. In 1985 the five-door Renault 11 also became available, initially only in sporting GTX trim with alloy wheels and equipped with the 1,721 cc (105.0 cu in) F2NA engine with 95 PS (70 kW). As of April 1986 the Renault 9 gained the twin headlight front design of the 11, while the 11 GTX was replaced by the TXE. From October 1986 the 1397 cc engine originally reserved for the R9 was also made available in the R11 GTS, eroding its position as a sportier model, while the 1.7-liter R9 TXE was also added. In September 1987 the range received the Phase 3 facelift.

After French production came to an end in 1989, Sanfu Motors had to source parts from Argentina and Colombia instead. While this did allow them to lower the price, it had a negative impact on quality and thus on Renault's reputation in Taiwan. After the 1990 introduction of the Renault 19 to Taiwan, production of the R11 was halted, with sales coming to an end in February 1991. In 1993 a facelifted version of the 9 was introduced, now called the Renault Luxmore (雷諾銀鑽). Sold as a sedan only, this had a restyled front end combined with the Renault 19 Chamade's taillights, and also adapted much of the 19's interior. The Luxmore's engine was a 1.4-liter Energy SOHC unit borrowed from the Clio, producing 72 PS (53 kW). Production ended in 1996 and the revised front end became used for the Phase 4 design built in Turkey beginning in 1997.

=== Turkey ===
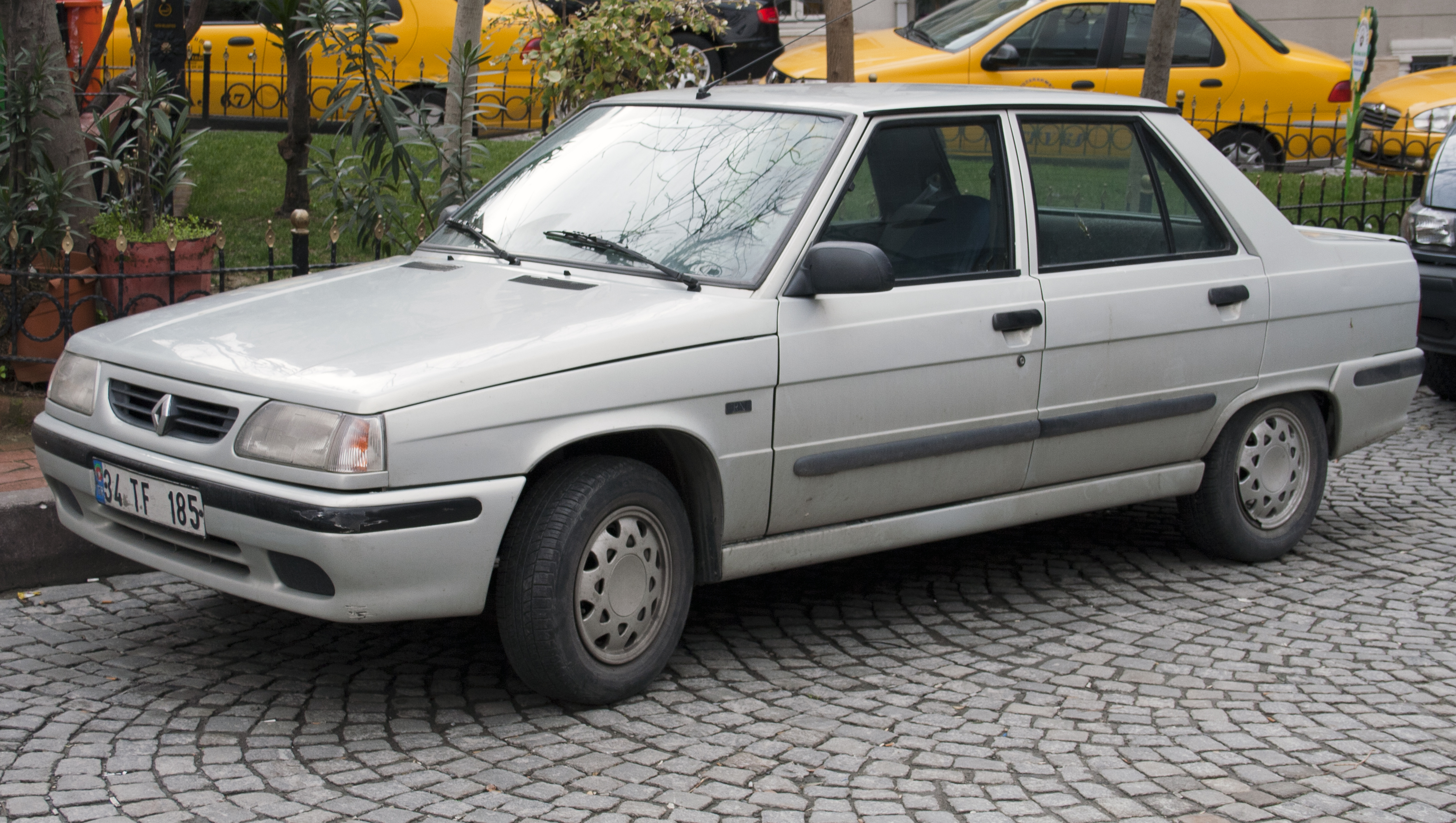
Oyak-built Renault Broadway (phase 3)

Built by Oyak-Renault in Bursa beginning in 1985, the Renault 9 retained the original "Phase 1" bodystyle until 1993. the Phase 2 Renault 9 was not built there, although a number of minor external and internal changes were carried out over the years. In 1986 the diesel-engined GTD joined the GTL in local production, becoming the first diesel-engined passenger car to be built in Turkey. There followed the petrol-engined GTC (1987) and the Broadway replaced the GTL in 1988. A Broadway GTE model also appeared around this time. The GTC was replaced by a new base model called the Renault 9 in Spring 1991. Power varied between 60 and 72 PS (44 and 53 kW) depending on model and year. In April 1993, the range was updated, using the Phase 2 facelift front. The 1.4-liter Broadway with 72 PS replaced the Spring and other models, while the 1.6-liter 80 PS (59 kW) Fairway model was added, using the Argentinian C2L engine with a twin-barrel Weber carburetor. The Fairway received the headlights and various trim parts from the 11 Flash S in September 1994 but was discontinued in the first half of 1996 due to dropping sales.

A modernized, more ovoid design (phase 3) was released in Turkey in 1997 as the Renault Broadway and was sold there until 2000. From 1996, the 1.4-litre engine (now the only size available) received fuel injection in order to meet European emissions standards. These late models were initially sold as the RNi, later simply 1.4i, and produce 80 PS (59 kW).

The five-door Renault 11 was built in Turkey in 1.4-liter GTS trim from 1987. The following year the 92 PS (68 kW) 1.7-liter TXE version was added, better known as the 11 Flash. The three-door 11 was never assembled by Oyak-Renault. To celebrate Galatasaray reaching the semifinals in the 1989 European Champions Clubs' Cup, a special edition of 500 cars called the Flash Galatasaray was produced. In 1990, there was a Fenerbahçe special edition. Both of these featured elements in the team colours and various other special equipment. In 1993, the 11 was facelifted (Phase 3), with the GTS replaced by a 1.6-liter 11 Rainbow, matching the Renault 9 Fairway. The 11 Flash S replaced the earlier Flash model, offering the exterior design features of the 11 Turbo with Speedline Renault 5 GT Turbo wheels (but produced by CMS wheels) and an upgraded engine producing 103 PS (76 kW). The 11 ceased production in Turkey in 1995.

=== United States and Canada ===
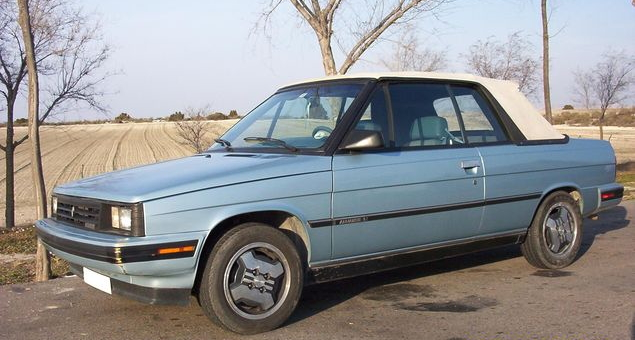
U.S. 1987 Renault Alliance Convertible

The subcompact sized automobile was manufactured and marketed in North America by American Motors Corporation (AMC) as the Renault Alliance from model years 1983 to 1987, and with a three and five door hatchback variant, the Renault Encore marketed beginning in 1984. For 1987, AMC offered the one year only GTA sedan and convertible, which included a 2.0 L engine, sport suspension, Zender GmbH aerodynamic body kit, and Ronal wheels. The Encore was renamed to Alliance Hatchback in the same year.

Production of the Alliance and GTA was discontinued after Chrysler's buyout of AMC in 1987. A total of 623,573 units were manufactured.

== In culture ==
In the 1985 James Bond film A View to a Kill, a Renault 11 TXE taxi plays a significant role. Renowned stuntman Rémy Julienne coordinates a sequence in which the roof of the Renault 11 is torn off and the car is cut in half during a collision with a Renault 20.
