= Renault Energy engine =

Energy engine
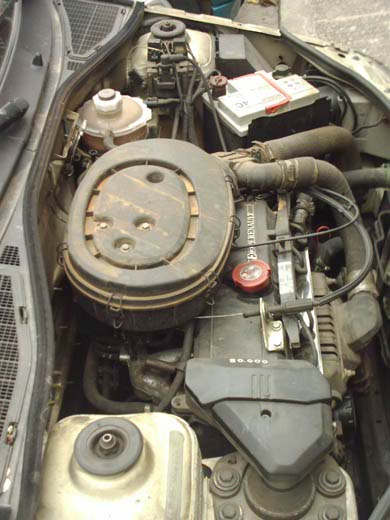
- E5F engine in a 1992 Renault Clio

Overview
- Manufacturer: Renault
- Also called: Renault E-Type engine
- Production: 1988–2005

Layout
- Configuration: I4
- Displacement: 1.2 L (1,171 cc); 1.4 L (1,390 cc)
- Cylinder bore: 75.8 mm (2.98 in)
- Piston stroke: 64.9 mm (2.56 in); 77 mm (3.03 in)
- Cylinder block material: Cast iron
- Cylinder head material: Aluminum
- Valvetrain: Overhead camshaft 8 valves

Combustion
- Fuel system: Carburetor, Single-point injection and Multipoint fuel injection
- Fuel type: Gasoline
- Cooling system: Water-cooled

Chronology
- Predecessor: Cléon-Fonte engine
- Successor: DiET engine (Petrol); K engine (Diesel)

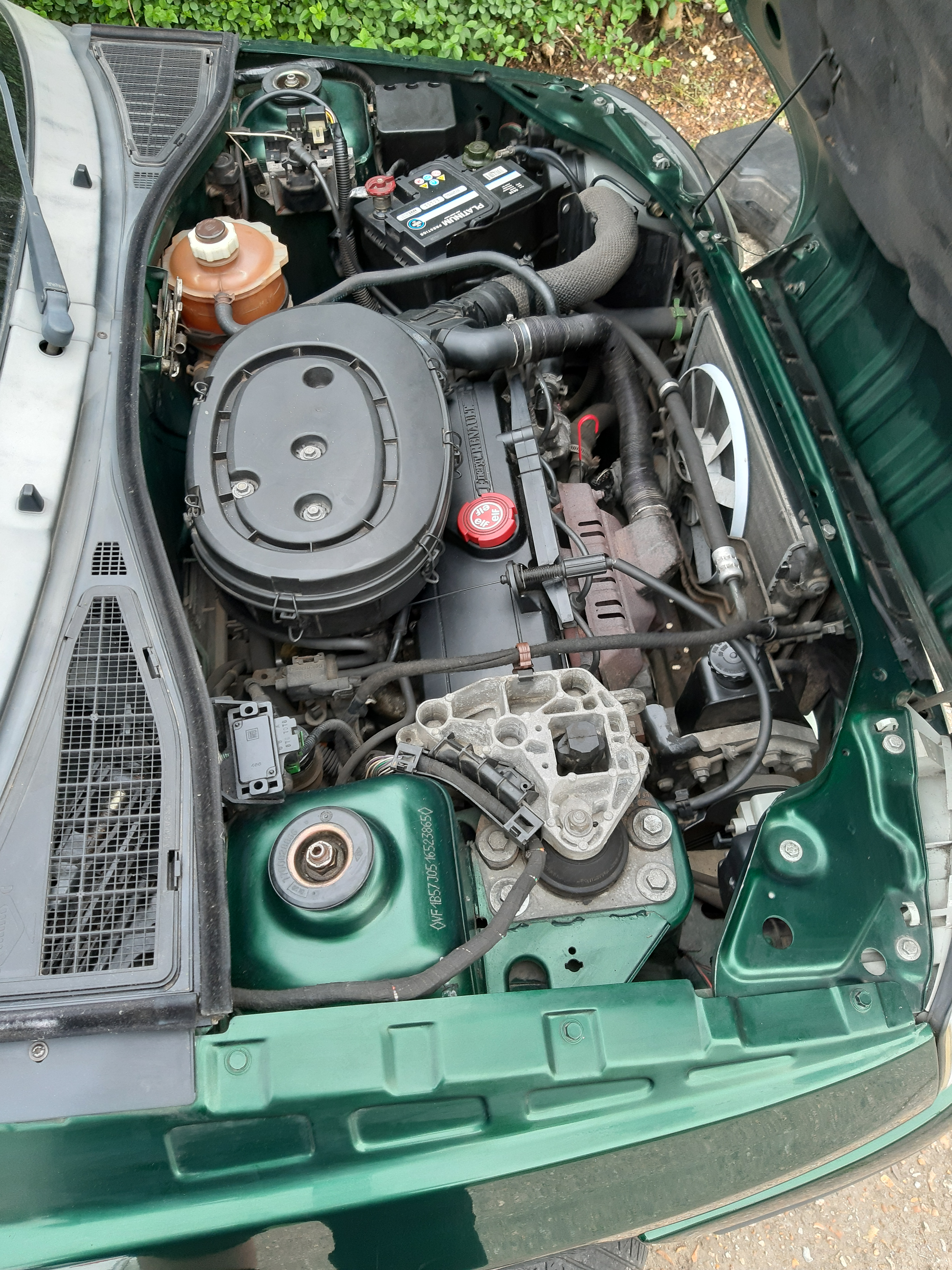
An E7J engine in a 1997 Renault Clio I RT 1.4

The Renault Energy engine also known as "E engine" or "E-Type" (E for Energy) is an automotive gasoline four-stroke inline four cylinder internal combustion engine, with a sleeved water cooled cast iron block, equipped with 5 crankshaft bearings, an overhead camshaft driven by a toothed timing belt and an aluminum cylinder head with 8 overhead valves. Developed and produced by Renault in the late 1980s, the engine made its first appearance in the Renault 19.

== History ==
In the late 1980s, the Cléon-Fonte engine still fitted to the R4, Super 5, R9, R11 and Express had become outdated with its lateral camshaft design. Competing brands were building more modern engines with overhead camshafts. The Cléon-Fonte engine had first appeared in 1962 on the Renault 8 and Renault Floride.

For the successor of the R9 and R11, the R19, Renault would develop a more modern engine. Renault modernized its old Cléon-Fonte motor with a new hemispheric cylinder head and an overhead camshaft, driven by a toothed timing belt, which appeared as the Energy in 1988. This new engine would go on to be used in the Clio 1, Mégane 1 and even Express. The Energy engine has also equipped the Renault 9 in Argentina, Colombia and Turkey.

However, at the launch of the Renault Twingo in 1993, Renault would be forced to continue production of the Cléon-Fonte engine because the "E engine", due to its hemispherical cylinder head and front exhaust, was too large to accommodate in the Twingo. The Energy (E7F) was gradually replaced with the D7F engine in 1996 on the Renault Clio, due to new standards of pollution control and lower fuel consumption required for more modern engines. The D7F engine simultaneously replaced the 1.2 Energy and the 1.2 Cléon-Fonte.

The E7J was replaced by the K7J engine.

== Cylinder dimensions and displacement ==
Engine types	E5F — E7F	E6J — E7J
Bore	75.8 mm (2.98 in)	
Stroke	64.9 mm (2.56 in)	77 mm (3.03 in)
Displacement	1.2 L (1,171 cc)	1.4 L (1,390 cc)

== Evolution Engine ==
The Energy engine evolved into the K engine that appeared on the Megane 1. The main difference is the machining of the cylinders since this engine has removable liners. The head of the Energy engine is kept on 8 valve versions. The K engine was also developed in 16-valve versions and was available as a diesel (K9K — 1.5 dCi).

== ExF ==
The ExF displaces 1,171 cc (1.2 L; 71.5 cu in). The E5F is carbureted while the E7F has an electronically controlled single-point injection coupled to a catalytic converter. Output ranges between 40 and 44 kW (54 and 60 PS) depending on model year and application.

Applications:

- E5F
  - 1991–1997 Renault Clio
- E7F
  - 1988–1990 Renault R19
  - 1991–1997 Renault Clio

== ExJ ==
The ExJ displaces 1,390 cc (1.4 L; 84.8 cu in)

Applications:

- E6J (carbureted)
  - 1988–1995 Renault R19
  - 1991–1997 Renault Clio
- E7J (fuel injected)
  - 1989– Renault Extra
  - 1988–2000 Renault R19
  - 1991–1997 Renault Clio
  - 1996–1999 Renault Mégane
  - –1988 Renault 9
  - 1998–2001 Renault Kangoo
  - 1997–2001 Renault Clio
  - 2000–2003 Dacia SupeRNova
  - 2003–2005 Dacia Solenza
