= Renault 19 =

Automobile model

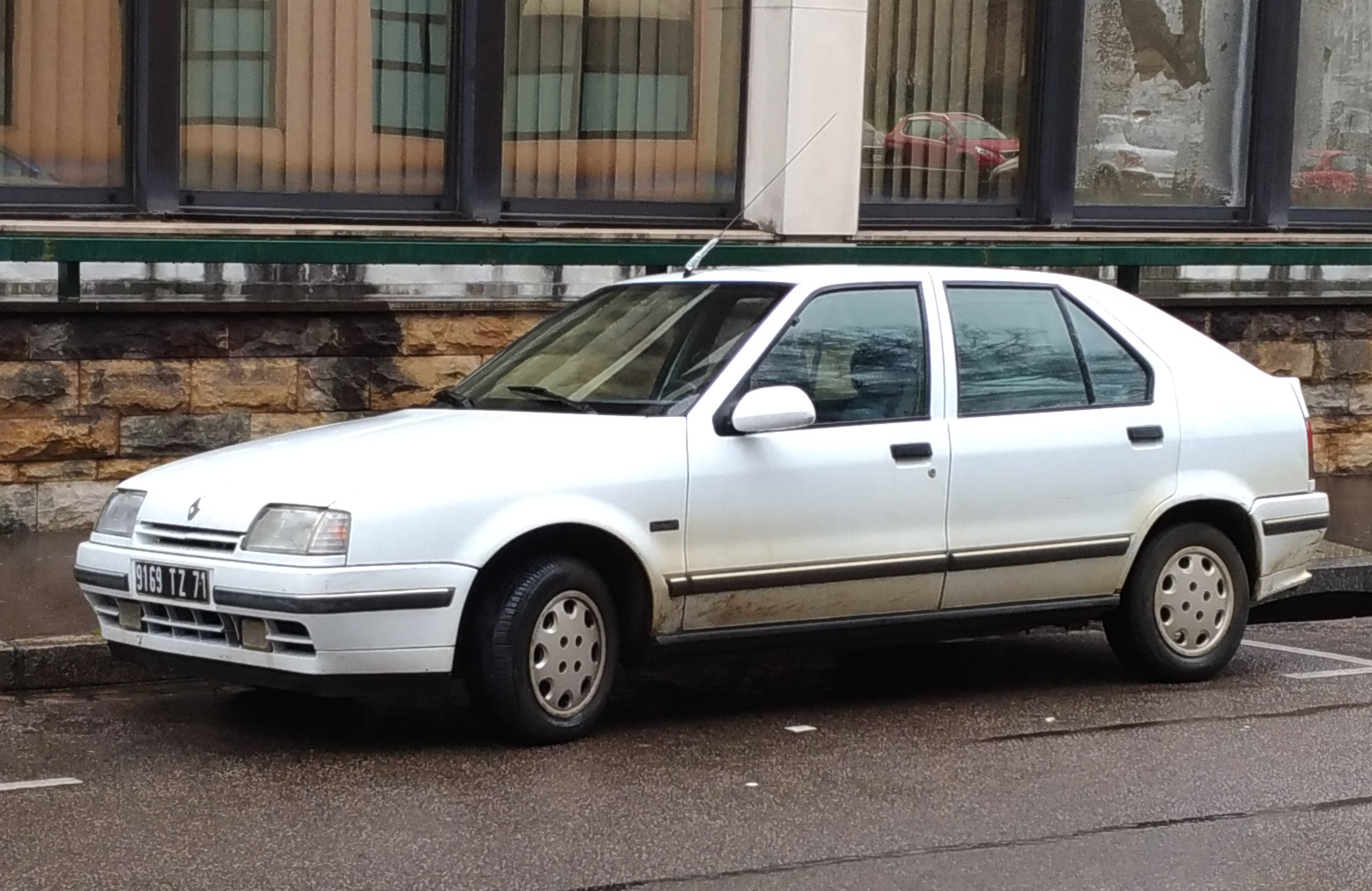
- Renault 19 Phase 1 (hatchback)

Overview
- Manufacturer: Renault
- Also called: Renault Energy (Colombia, Venezuela)
- Production: 1988–1996; 1993–2000 (Argentina, Turkey)
- Assembly: France: Douai; France: Maubeuge; Belgium: Vilvoorde; Germany: Osnabruck; Spain: Valladolid; Spain: Palencia; Portugal: Setúbal; Turkey: Bursa; Colombia: Envigado; Venezuela: Mariara; Argentina: Santa Isabel; Taiwan: Taichung
- Designer: Giorgetto Giugiaro at Italdesign

Body and chassis
- Class: Small family car (C)
- Body style: 3/5-door hatchback 4-door saloon ("Chamade"); 2-door convertible
- Layout: FF layout
- Related: Renault Mégane I

Powertrain
- Engine: petrol: 1.2 L C1G I4; 1.2 L E7F I4; 1.4 L C2J/C3J I4; 1.4 L E6J/E7J I4; 1.6 L C2L/C3L; 1.7 L F2N/F3N I4; 1.8 L F2P/F3P I4; 1.8 L F7P DOHC 16-valve I4; diesel: 1.9 L F8Q I4; 1.9 L F8Q turbo I4

Dimensions
- Wheelbase: 2,540 mm (100.0 in)
- Length: Hatchback: 4,156 mm (163.6 in); Chamade: 4,248 mm (167.2 in)
- Width: 1,694 mm (66.7 in)
- Height: 1,412 mm (55.6 in)
- Curb weight: 886–1,175 kg (1,953–2,590 lb)

Chronology
- Predecessor: Renault 9 / Renault 11
- Successor: Renault Mégane

The Renault 19 is a small family car that was produced by the French car manufacturer Renault between 1988 and 1996. In Turkey and in Argentina, production continued until 2000. The internal development code for the 19 was X53, with the five door receiving the B53 chassis code, the three door being the C53, the Chamade the L53, and the Cabriolet the D53.

== Overview ==
The R19 was presented in June 1988, with sales in the domestic French market beginning in September 1988. It was the replacement for the 9 and 11, both of which were ageing and outdated by the end of the 1980s. The R19 went on sale in right hand drive form for the British market in February 1989.

The R19 was styled by Giorgetto Giugiaro, featuring Renault's new E-type (or "Energy") 1.4 L engine and F type 1.7 L versions. Base models originally used the OHV C-type Cléon 1.2 and 1.4 L engines, depending on the market. While originally only available with an atmospheric diesel engine, a turbocharged version appeared in the beginning of 1992.

Intended to be Renault's last numeric named car, the 19 ushered in a new naming policy, with the saloon versions of the 19 being known as the 19 Chamade, to distinguish them from the hatchbacks. The saloon version was launched in 1989. In many markets, the Chamade badge was dropped following the facelift of 1992, with some replacing it with the "Europa" tag. The 19 Chamade customers were more often men, more often married and more rural and older than R19 hatchback buyers.

In 1991, a convertible bodystyle built by Karmann was first shown; only a small number of these were built with the Phase I design as it was facelifted shortly thereafter. The convertible version went on sale in the beginning of 1992; it was only available with the two most powerful engine options. Although the R19's exterior design (which was relatively conservative, like that of the Renault 9/11) received a muted response, it was praised for its interior comfort, handling, and for being of a higher quality than previous Renaults.

For the fuel injected top versions, a four-speed automatic transmission became available in the fall of 1990. Lesser versions still made do with four- or five-speed manuals, or a three-speed automatic.

Phase 1

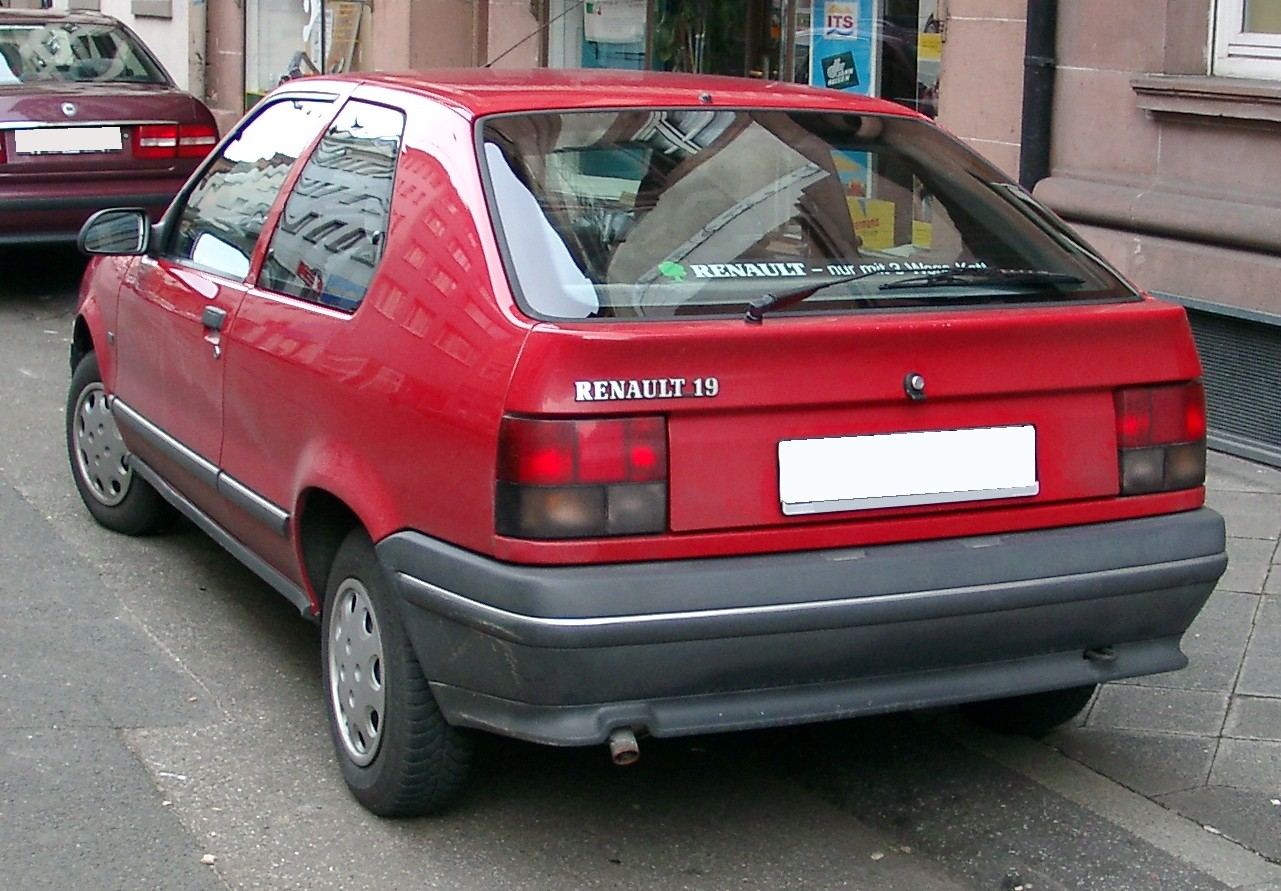
Hatchback (rear)

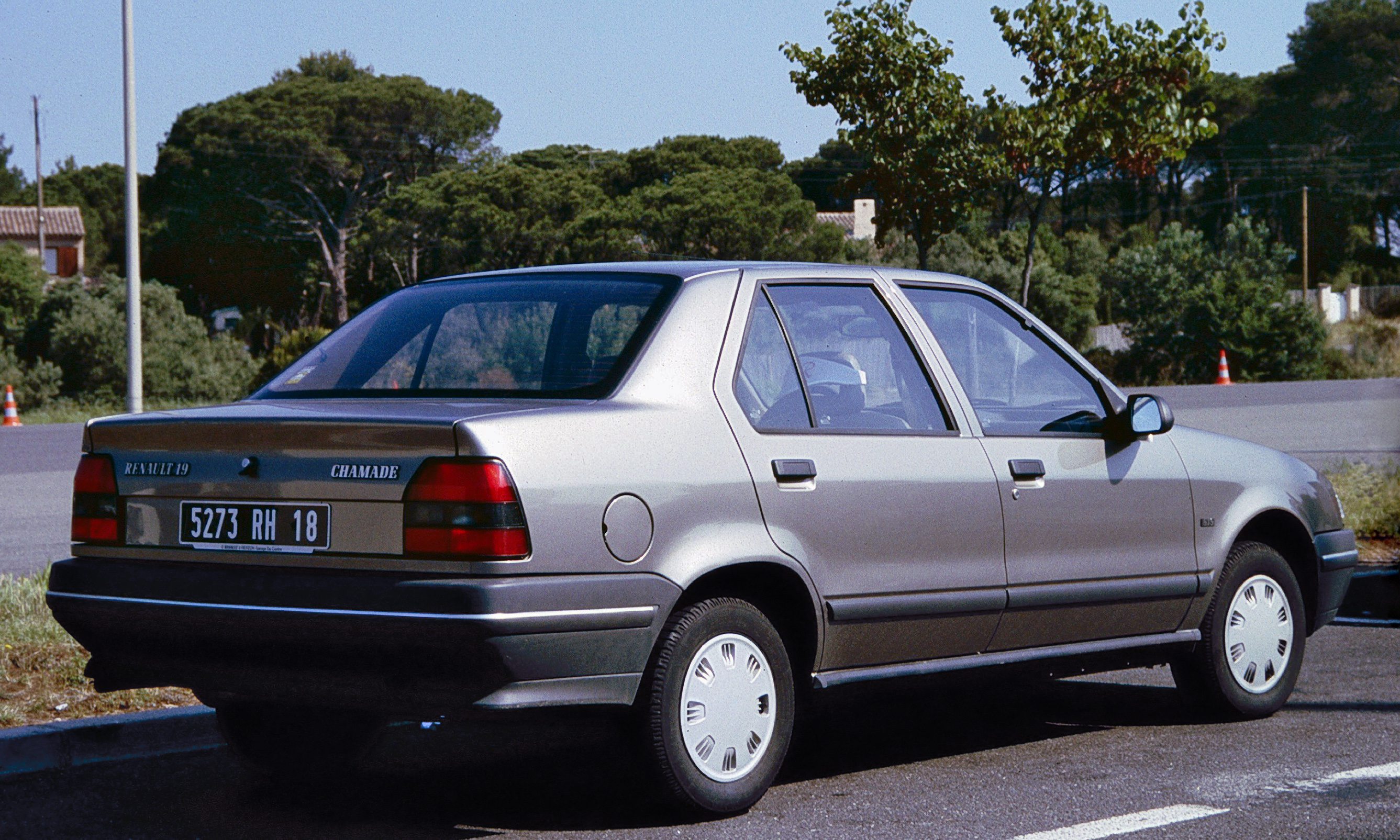
"Chamade", saloon (rear)

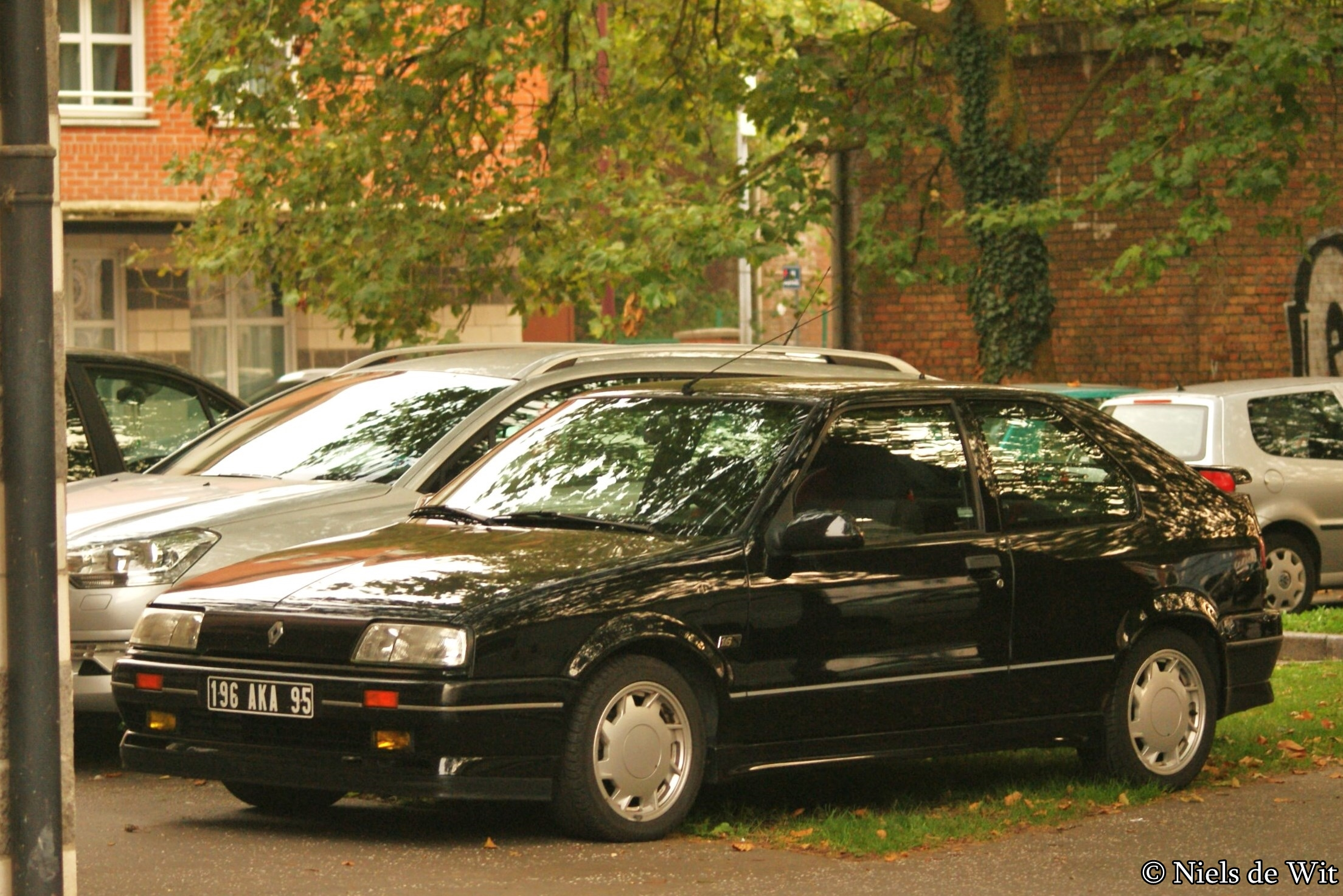
Renault 19 16S; early version without bonnet vent

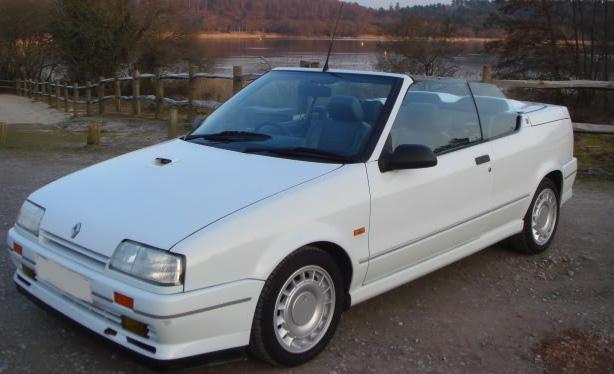
Convertible

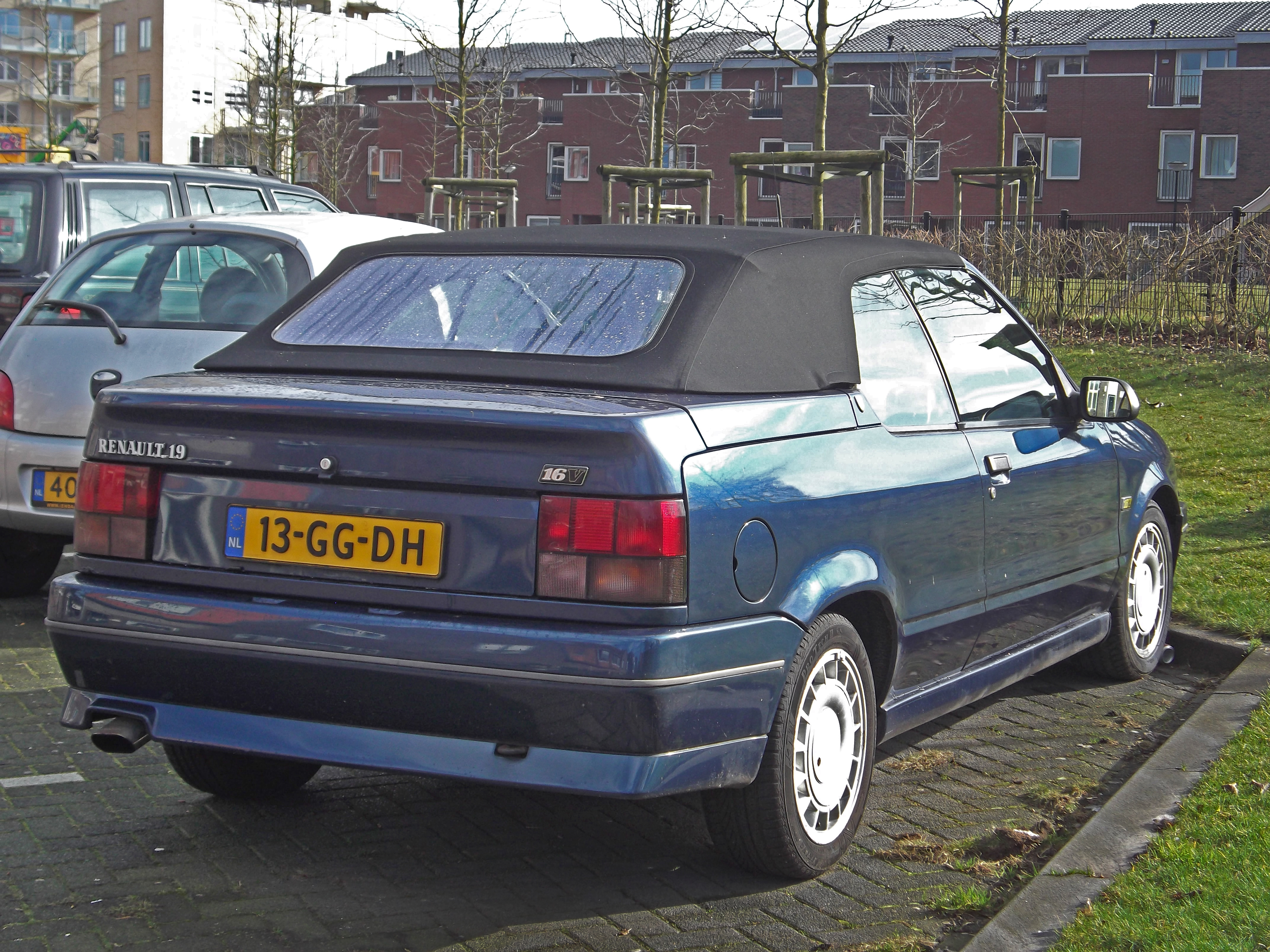
Convertible (rear)

=== Facelift ===
In the summer of 1992, a revamped model was introduced with a substantially restyled front and rear, including a new dashboard and interior — although right-hand drive models retained the original dashboard from the Phase 1.

With the facelift, smaller "Energy" series units gradually replaced the old pushrod items, and 1.8 litre engines appeared at the top of the lineup, where they replaced the more powerful 1.7 units (the F3N). The R19 was sold in most of Europe until 1996, and was produced for some South American markets in Argentina until 2000 and for the Andean markets in Colombia until 2001. Turkish production lasted a little longer than in the rest of Europe, also until the year 2000. The R19's platform and running gear would continue to be used in its replacement, the first generation Renault Mégane, which lasted for seven years.

The Renault 19 was awarded the 1989 Car of the Year in Spain and Germany, 1990 Car of the Year in Ireland, and 1993 Car of the Year in Argentina. It was sold in limited numbers in Japan through the Yanase Import Dealerships. The name "Chamade" wasn't used on Japanese-market saloons because it was deemed too similar to the Daihatsu Charade, so these were called "Europa" instead. San Fu Motors in Taiwan began building two versions of the R19 locally in early 1990, aiming for a monthly output of 1,000 cars.

The R19 did well in Germany, a market French carmakers always had a hard time cracking. It was the best selling imported car in West Germany in 1990 and then in reunited Germany from 1991 to 1994.

Phase 2

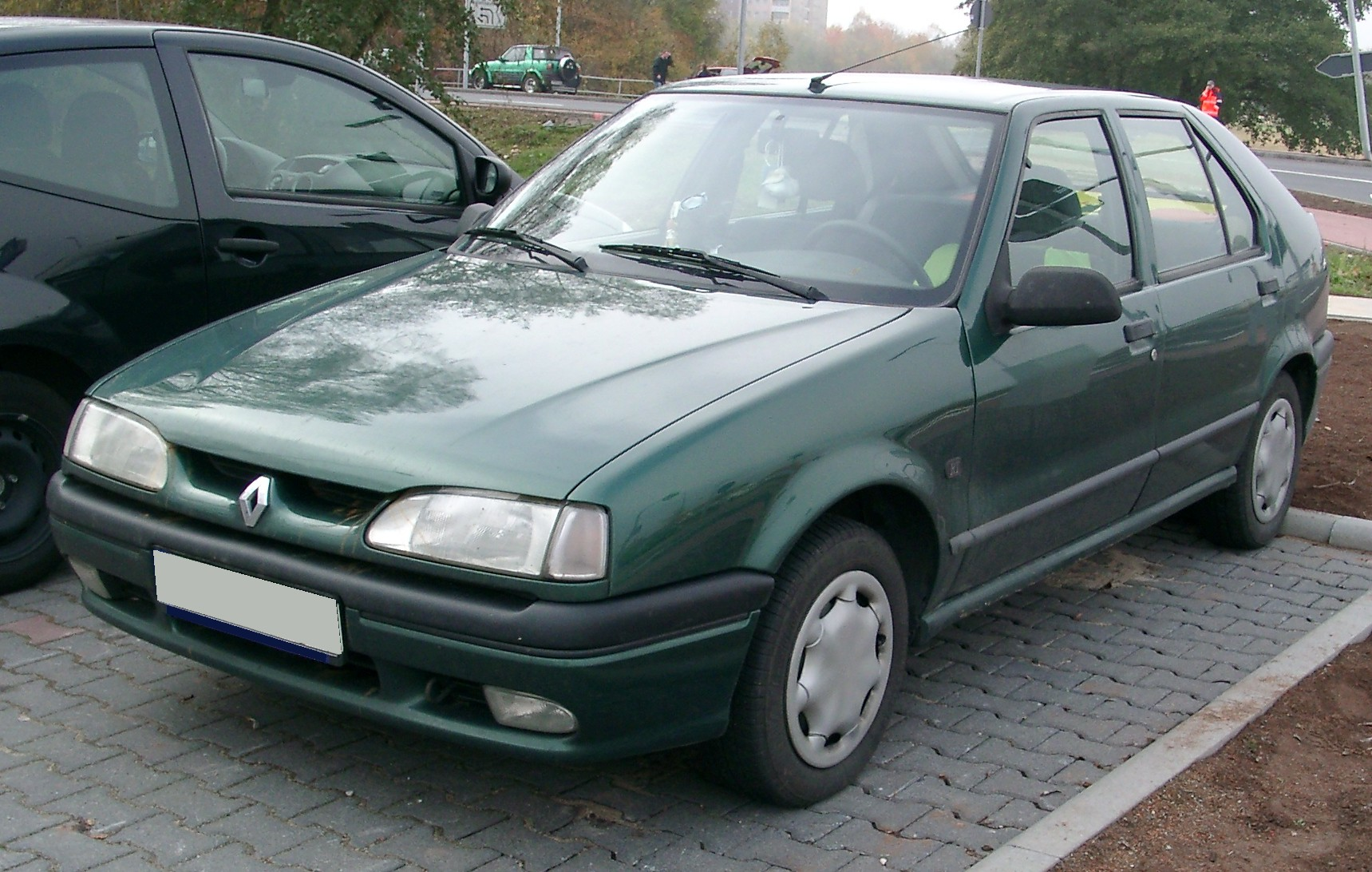
Hatchback

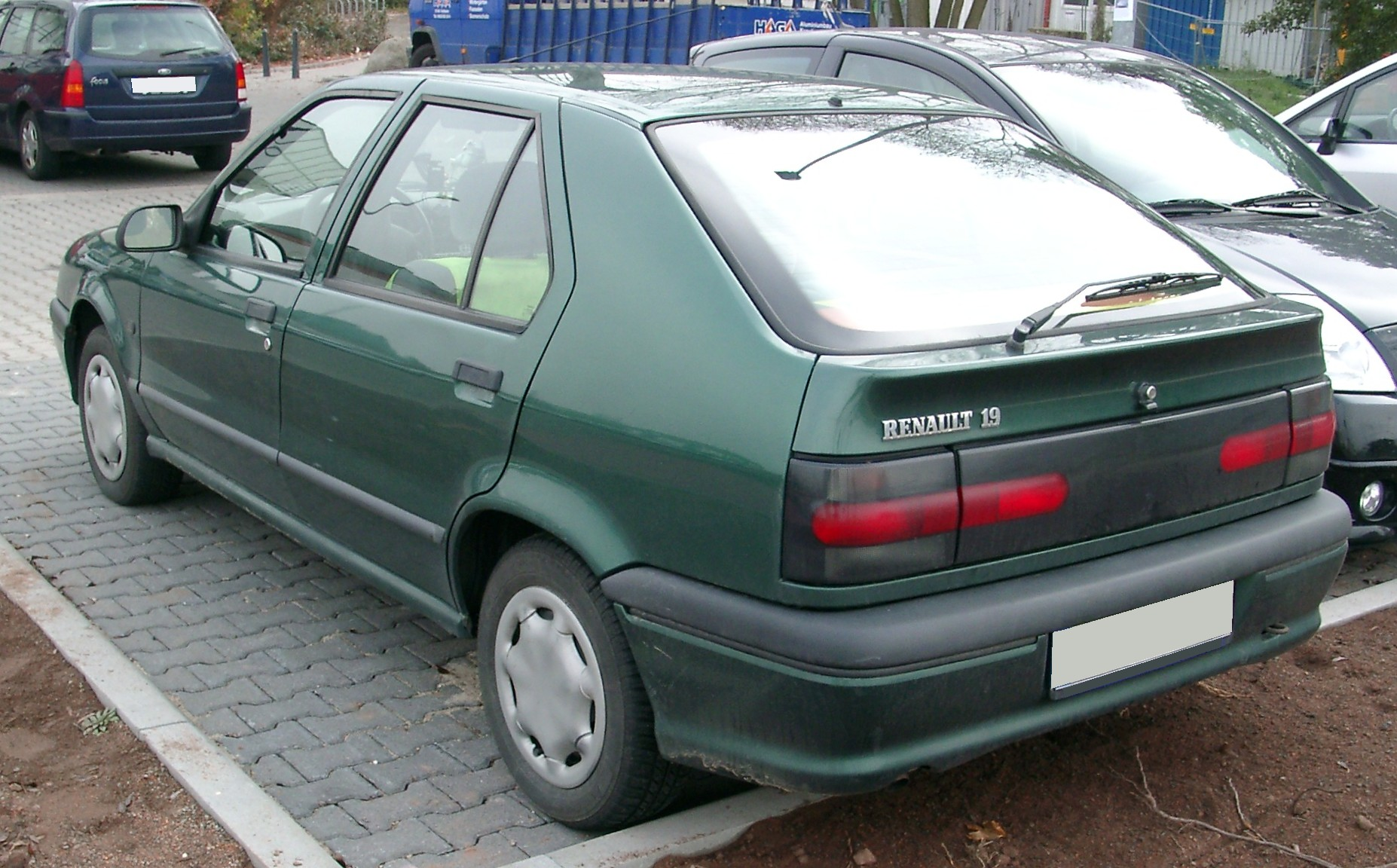
Hatchback (rear)

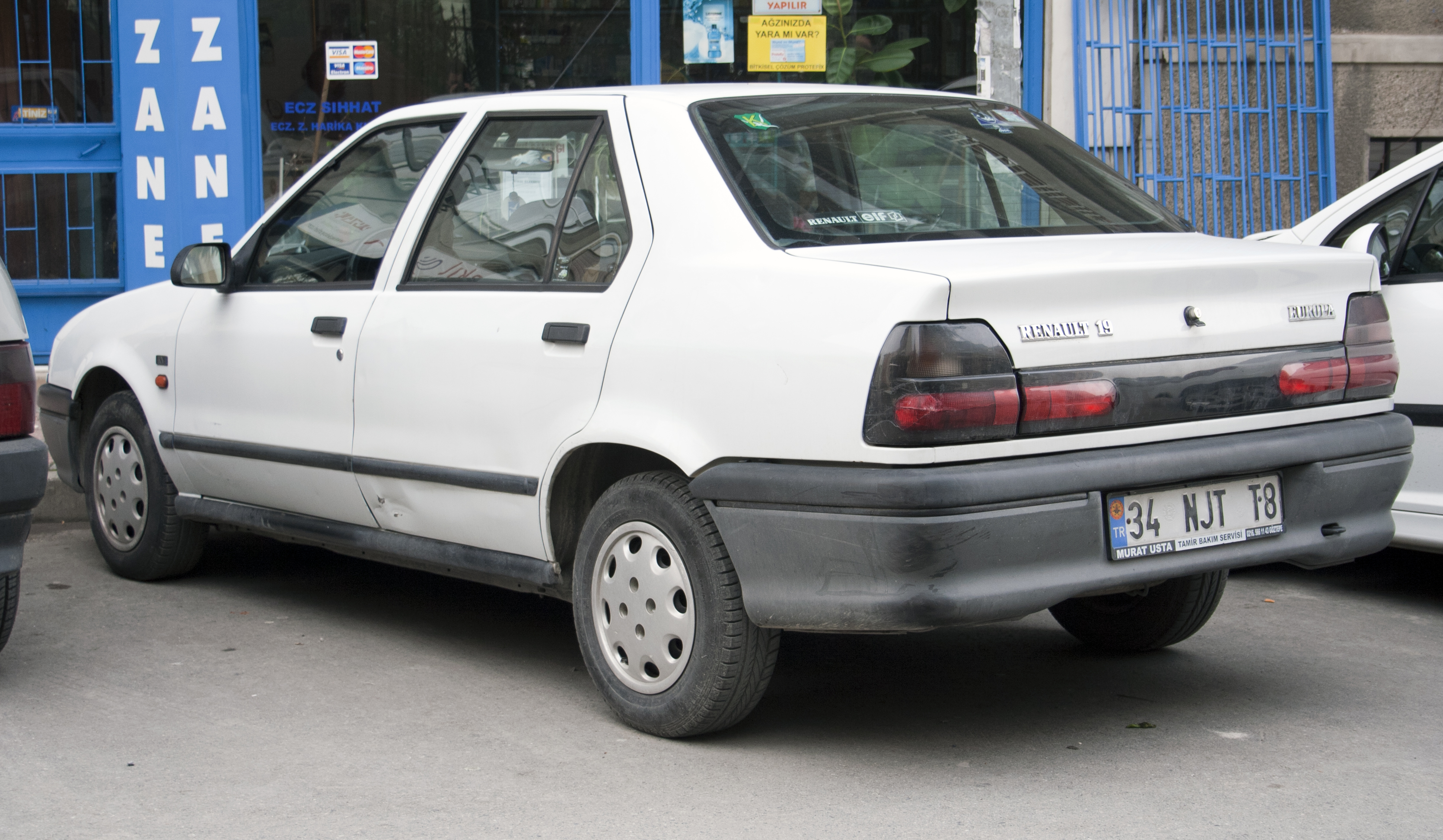
Phase 2 saloon ("Chamade/Europa/Bellevue")

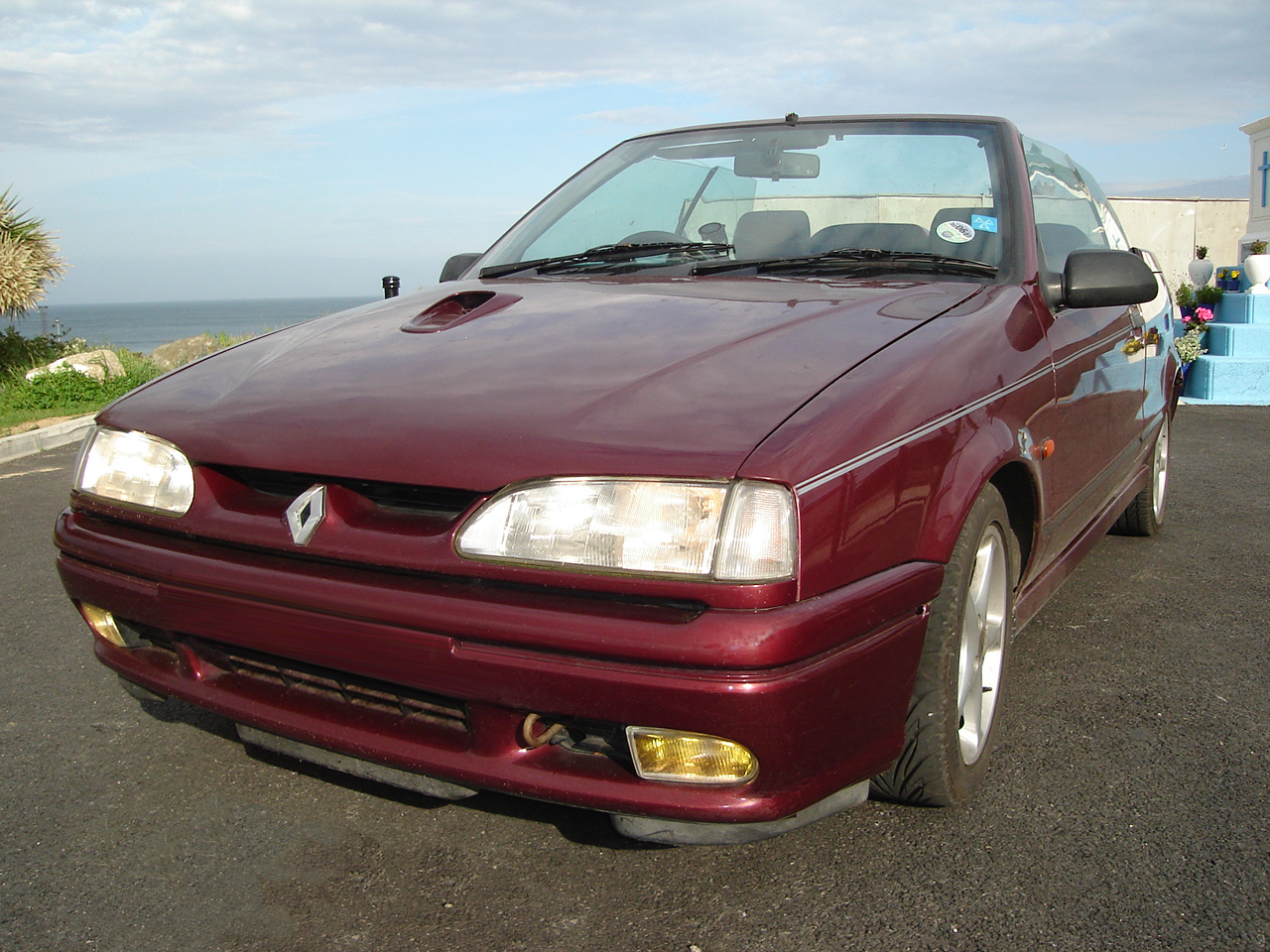
Convertible 16V, note bonnet vent

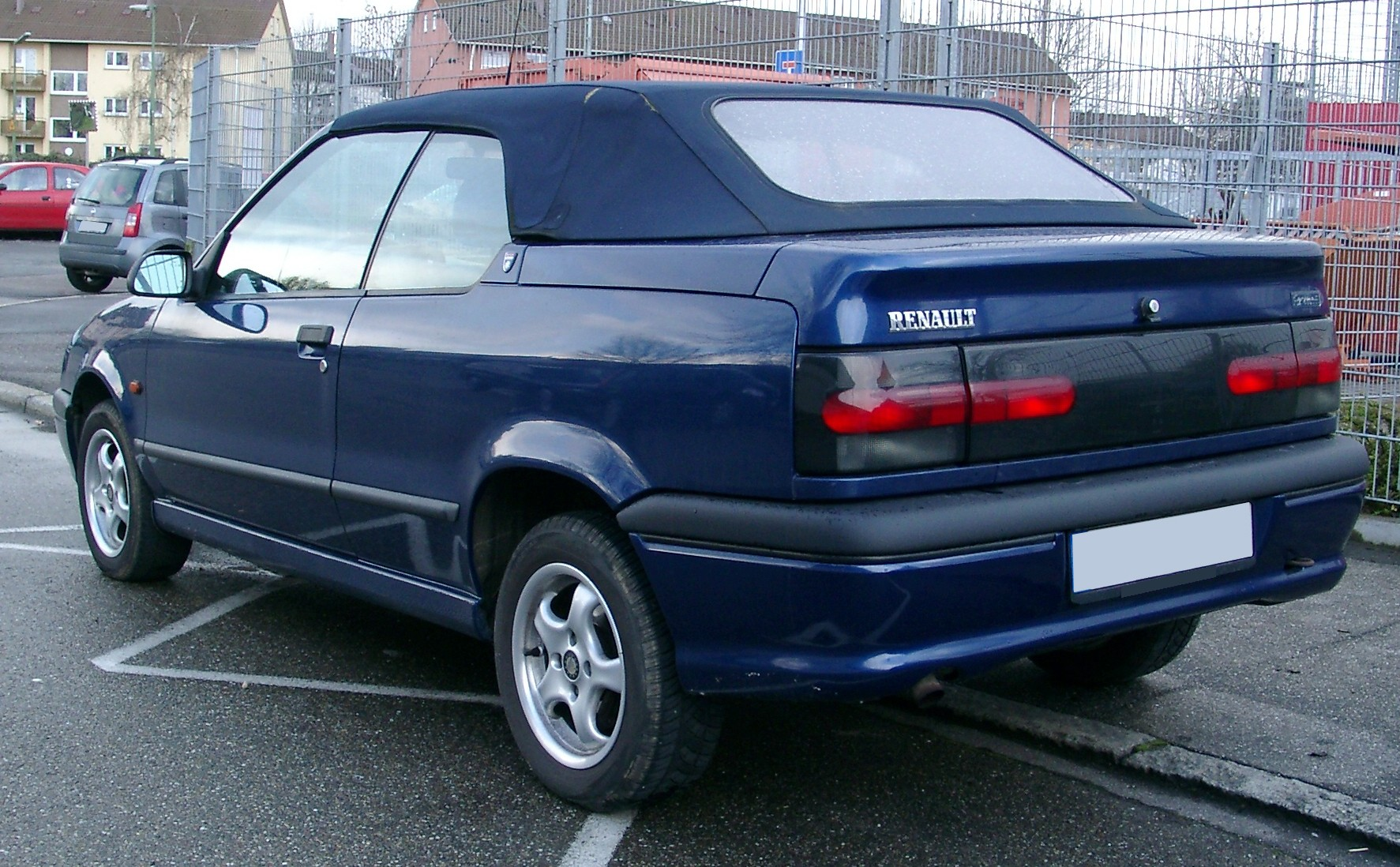
Convertible (rear)

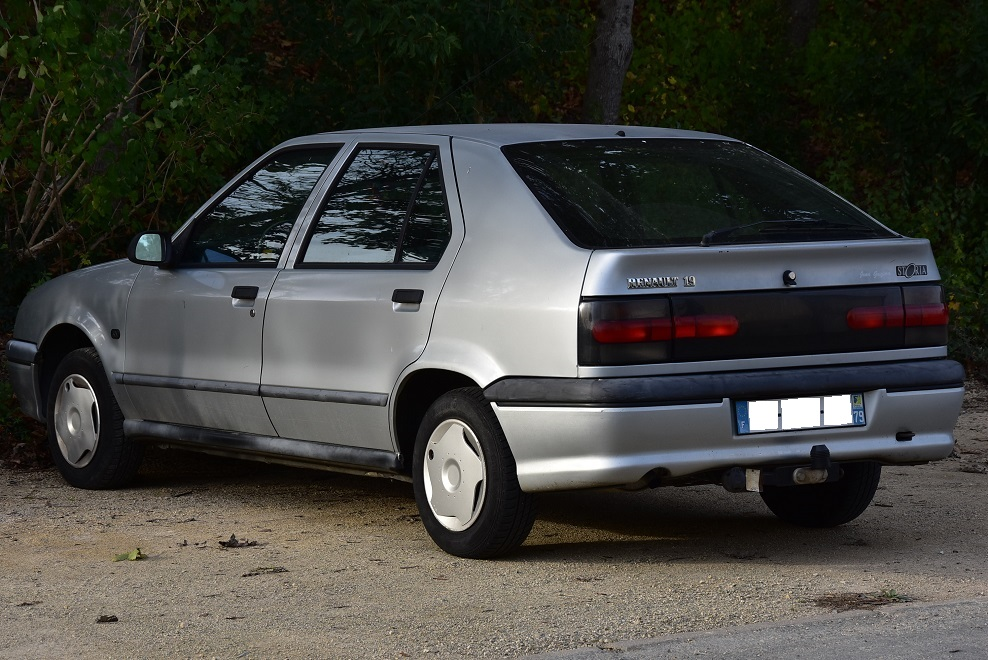
1.4e RN Storia, 1995

=== 16S ===
The Renault 19 16S (16V in some countries) was first shown towards the very end of 1988. It was only actually added to the lineup in the autumn of 1990, and was the only Renault 19 with a 16 valve engine. It had a distinctive air inlet on the bonnet (this did not appear on the earliest models), a rear spoiler, 15 inch Speedline SL401 alloy wheels, side skirts, twin headlamps, Recaro bucket seats with optional leather trim, four in one exhaust manifold and Bendix ABS braking system with optional trip computer, aircon and electric sunroof. The "S" is for Soupapes, French for valves.

Its rev happy F7P engine, which, along with the advanced Renix ECU, made it faster and more fuel efficient compared to most competitors. The braking system was upgraded to include 259 mm (10.2 in) vented discs on the front and 237 mm (9.3 in) discs on the rear as well as an uprated lower suspension setup and front strut bar. Period tests praised the car's handling on curvy roads but criticized its high speed stability and noise levels, in part due to very low gearing.

Phase 1 editions benefited from unique front and rear bumpers with front indicators relocated into the bumpers to allow for the twin headlamps, while the Phase 2 retained the original bumpers found throughout the range but added colour coded tops, rubber inserts, and a discreet lower splitter. All bodystyles were offered with the 16 valve engine at one time or another, but were not available in all markets.

The Phase 2 models gear ratios were also revised, to allow for the extra weight found in the safety equipment the later models carried. The last models (1995 to 1996) were called Executive and came with leather interior as standard.

Renault claimed an acceleration from 0 to 100 km/h (62 mph) of 8.2 seconds for the non-catalysed version with 140 PS (103 kW; 138 hp). This engine was only available in the Phase 1 model. The catalysed model boasted 137 PS (101 kW; 135 hp) and a top speed of 215 km/h (134 mph), and a claimed 0 to 100 km/h time of 8.9 seconds.

== Motorsport ==
Renault Sport used the 19 in the British Touring Car Championship in 1993, driven by Alain Menu and Tim Harvey. The car proved uncompetitive except in wet conditions, and was replaced with the Laguna for the 1994 season.

== Engines ==
Model	Engine	Displacement	Valvetrain	Fuel system	Max. power at rpm	Max. torque at rpm	Top speed	Years
Petrol engines
1.2	C1G	1237 cc	OHV 8v	Carburettor	55 PS (40 kW; 54 hp) at 5000 rpm	90 N⋅m (66 lb⋅ft) at 3000 rpm	155 km/h (96 mph)	1988–1990
1.2e	E7F	1171 cc	SOHC 8v	Single point fuel injection	58 PS (43 kW; 57 hp) at 6000 rpm	85 N⋅m (63 lb⋅ft) at 4000 rpm	155 km/h (96 mph)	1992–1995
1.4	C1J	1397 cc	OHV 8v	Carburettor	60 PS (44 kW; 59 hp) at 5250 rpm	101 N⋅m (74 lb⋅ft) at 2750 rpm		1988–1989
1.4e	C3J	1390 cc	OHV 8v	Single point fuel injection	58 PS (43 kW; 57 hp) at 4750 rpm	100 N⋅m (74 lb⋅ft) at 3000 rpm	161 km/h (100 mph)	1989–1995
1.4	E6J	1390 cc	SOHC 8v	Carburettor	80 PS (59 kW; 79 hp) at 5750 rpm	108 N⋅m (80 lb⋅ft) at 2750 rpm	176 km/h (109 mph)	1988–1992
1.4e	E7J	1390 cc	SOHC 8v	Single point fuel injection	79 PS (58 kW; 78 hp) at 6000 rpm	107 N⋅m (79 lb⋅ft) at 3500 rpm	173 km/h (107 mph)	1992–1995
1.6^{1}	C2L	1565 cc	OHV 8v	Carburettor	78 PS (57 kW; 77 hp) at 5000 rpm	123 N⋅m (91 lb⋅ft) at 3500 rpm		1992–2000
1.6^{1}	C3L	1565 cc	OHV 8v	Single point fuel injection	75 PS (55 kW; 74 hp) at 5000 rpm	133 N⋅m (98 lb⋅ft) at 5000 rpm		1992–2000
1.7	F2N	1721 cc	SOHC 8v	Carburettor	75 PS (55 kW; 74 hp) at 5000 rpm	125 N⋅m (92 lb⋅ft) at 3250 rpm		1988–1989
1.7	F2N	1721 cc	SOHC 8v	Carburettor	92 PS (68 kW; 91 hp) at 5750 rpm	138 N⋅m (102 lb⋅ft) at 3000 rpm	183 km/h (114 mph)	1988–1989
1.7	F3N	1721 cc	SOHC 8v	Single point fuel injection	73 PS (54 kW; 72 hp) at 5000 rpm	127 N⋅m (94 lb⋅ft) at 2750 rpm	171 km/h (106 mph)	1989–1995
1.7	F3N	1721 cc	SOHC 8v	Single point fuel injection	90 PS (66 kW; 89 hp) at 5250 rpm	140 N⋅m (103 lb⋅ft) at 3000 rpm	185 km/h (115 mph)	1989–1992
1.7	F3N	1721 cc	SOHC 8v	Multi point fuel injection	107 PS (79 kW; 106 hp) at 5800 rpm	151 N⋅m (111 lb⋅ft) at 4000 rpm	190 km/h (118 mph)	1990–1992
1.8	F3P	1794 cc	SOHC 8v	Single point fuel injection	88 PS (65 kW; 87 hp) at 5750 rpm	142 N⋅m (105 lb⋅ft) at 2750 rpm	181 km/h (112 mph)	1992–1994
1.8	F3P	1783 cc	SOHC 8v	Single point fuel injection	90 PS (66 kW; 89 hp) at 5750 rpm	144 N⋅m (106 lb⋅ft) at 2750 rpm	181 km/h (112 mph)	1994–1997
1.8	F3P	1794 cc	SOHC 8v	Multi point fuel injection	109 PS (80 kW; 108 hp) at 5500 rpm	160 N⋅m (118 lb⋅ft) at 4250 rpm	195 km/h (121 mph)	1992–1994
1.8	F3P	1783 cc	SOHC 8v	Multi point fuel injection	107 PS (79 kW; 106 hp) at 5500 rpm	158 N⋅m (117 lb⋅ft) at 4250 rpm	195 km/h (121 mph)	1994–1997
1.8 16S	F7P	1764 cc	DOHC 16v	Multi point fuel injection	140 PS (103 kW; 138 hp) at 6500 rpm	165 N⋅m (122 lb⋅ft) at 4250 rpm	215 km/h (134 mph)	1990–1992
1.8 16S	F7P	1764 cc	DOHC 16v	Multi point fuel injection	137 PS (101 kW; 135 hp) at 6500 rpm	158 N⋅m (117 lb⋅ft) at 4250 rpm	212 km/h (132 mph)	1990–1997
Diesel engines
1.9 d	F8Q	1870 cc	SOHC 8v	Indirect injection	64 PS (47 kW; 63 hp) at 4500 rpm	118 N⋅m (87 lb⋅ft) at 2250 rpm	161 km/h (100 mph)	1988–1995
1.9 dT	F8Q	1870 cc	SOHC 8v	Indirect injection, turbo	90 PS (66 kW; 89 hp) at 4250 rpm	175 N⋅m (129 lb⋅ft) at 2250 rpm	183 km/h (114 mph)	1990–1995

^{1} Only for South America

== Manufacturing factories ==
- Douai (France)
- Maubeuge (France)
- Haren-Vilvoorde (Belgium)
- Laguna de Duero, Valladolid (Spain)
- Villamuriel de Cerrato, Palencia (Spain)
- Setúbal (Portugal)
- Santa Isabel, Córdoba (Argentina)
- Envigado (Colombia)
- Oyak-Renault, Bursa (Turkey)
- Sanfu Motor Co., Ltd., Taichung (Taiwan)
