= Nissan HR engine =

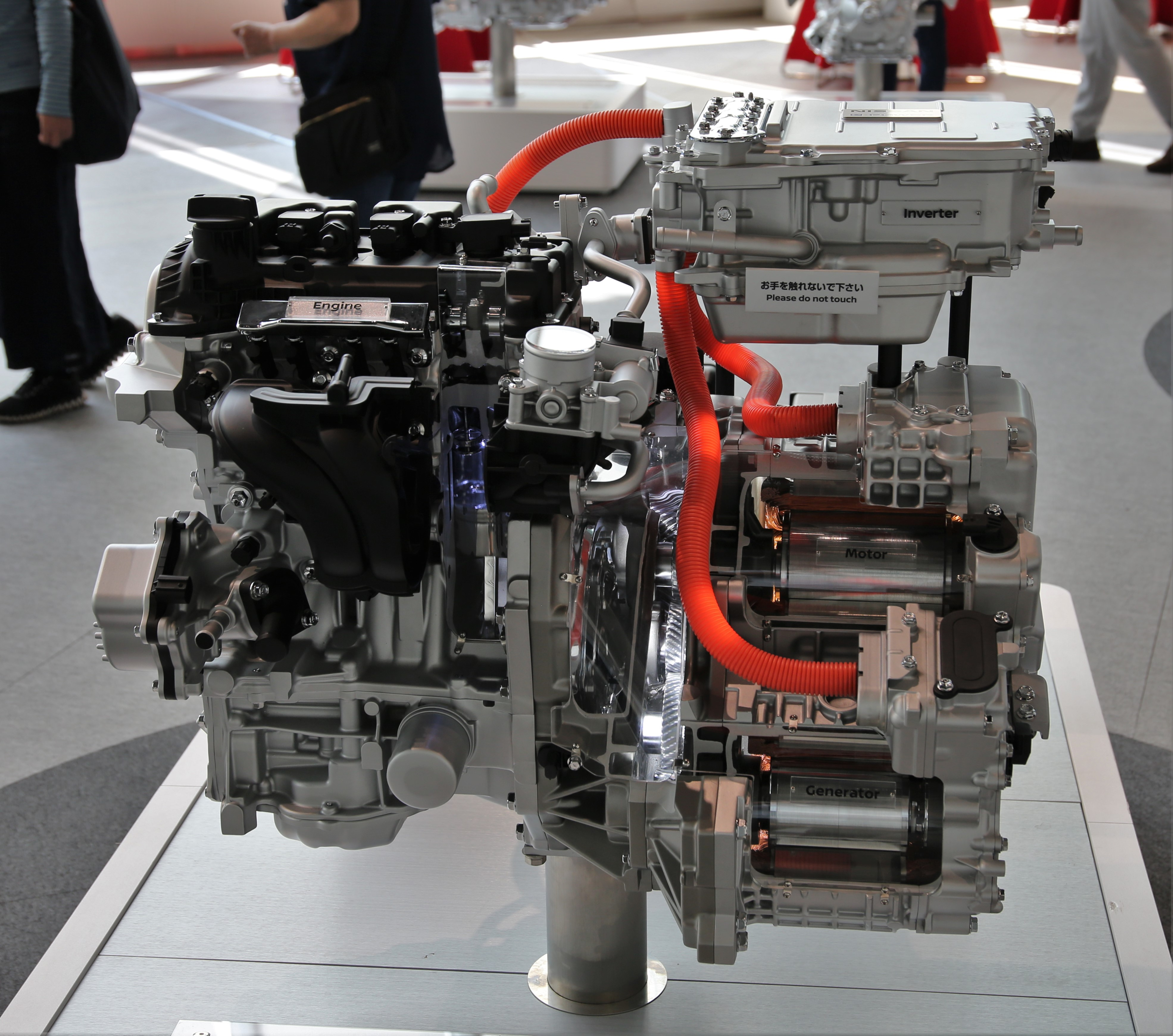

Overview
- Manufacturer: Nissan Machinery (Aichi Kikai), Renault and MDC Power GmbH (for Mercedes-Benz)
- Also called: Mercedes-Benz M281/282 engine Renault H engine
- Production: 2004–present

Layout
- Configuration: Inline-3, Inline-4
- Displacement: series 72.2: 0.9–1.3 L (898–1,332 cc) series 75.5: 1.2–1.5 L (1,199–1,498 cc) series 78: 1.0–1.6 L (999–1,598 cc)
- Cylinder bore: 72.2 mm (2.84 in); 75.5 mm (2.97 in); 78 mm (3.07 in)
- Piston stroke: 69.7 mm (2.74 in); 73.1 mm (2.88 in); 78.4 mm (3.09 in); 81.3 mm (3.20 in); 83.6 mm (3.29 in); 83.7 mm (3.30 in); 89.3 mm (3.52 in)
- Cylinder block material: Aluminum
- Cylinder head material: Aluminum
- Valvetrain: DOHC 4 valves x cyl. with VVT

Combustion
- Supercharger: On DDR series
- Turbocharger: On DDT series
- Fuel system: Electronic fuel injection; Direct injection
- Fuel type: Gasoline
- Cooling system: Water-cooled

Chronology
- Predecessor: Nissan CR engine

The HR is a family of straight-3 12-valve and straight-4 16-valve automobile petrol-only engines with continuously variable valve timing, involving development by Nissan and Renault through their Renault–Nissan–Mitsubishi Alliance partnership as well as Mercedes-Benz in the case of the H5Ht/M282. The designation of H engine is used by Renault, and M28x by Mercedes-Benz, to classify the family. There are three basic specifications of engine involving variations in engine architecture, or all-new architecture, with 72.2 mm (2.84 in), 75.5 mm (2.97 in) and 78 mm (3.07 in) bore diameter.

== 78 mm series (2004–) ==
- introduced in 09/2004 on Nissan Tiida C11 in Japan
- three- and four-cylinder layouts, multi point fuel injection except HR12DDR and HR14DDe with direct fuel injection
- most engines naturally aspirated with few exceptions being supercharged or turbocharged
- No Daimler involvement

=== HR10DE ===
The HR10DE is a 1.0 L (999 cc) naturally aspirated straight-three engine. Bore: 78 mm (3.07 in); Stroke 69.7 mm (2.74 in); 12v DOHC. It produces 56.6 kW (77 PS; 76 hp) and 98 N⋅m (72 lbf⋅ft). Flex-Fuel, gasoline (E22) or ethanol (E100). Compression ratio of 11.2:1.

It is fitted to the following vehicles:

- 2015 Nissan Micra K13 (Brazil)
- 2015 Nissan Versa N17 (Brazil)

=== HR12DE ===
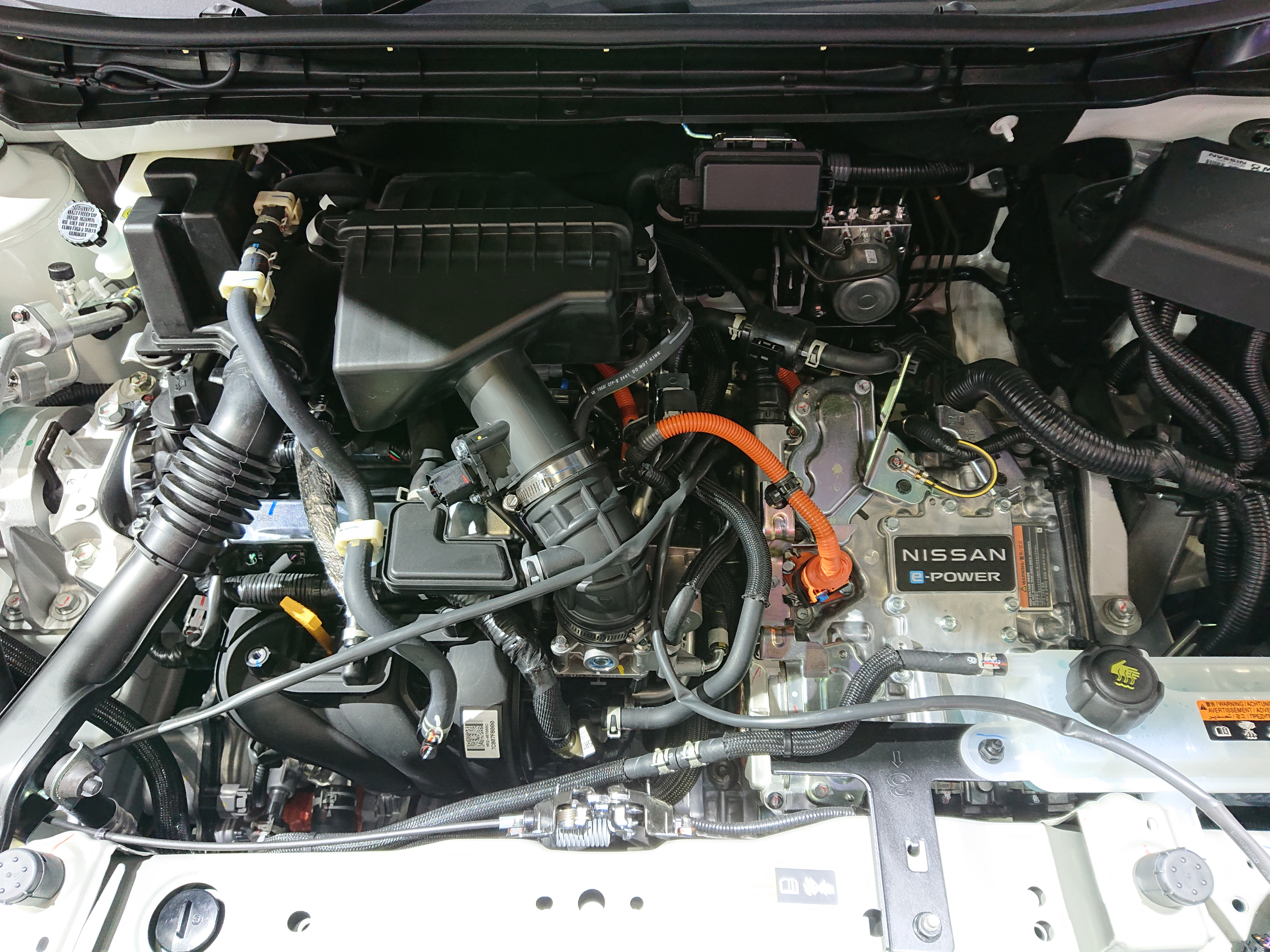
HR12DE with EM47 motor installed in 2023 Nissan Kicks e-POWER

The HR12DE is a 1.2 L (1,198 cc) naturally aspirated straight-three engine. Bore: 78 mm (3.07 in); Stroke 83.6 mm (3.29 in); 12-valve DOHC; EFI with variable valve timing. It produces 59 kW (80 PS; 79 hp) and 108 N⋅m (80 lbf⋅ft).

It is fitted to the following vehicles:

- 2010 Nissan Micra
- 2010 Nissan Almera (Thailand)
- 2012 Nissan Note
- 2014 Datsun Go/Datsun Go+ (68 PS (50 kW; 67 hp))
- 2016 Nissan Note e-Power (Japan)
- 2019 Datsun Go/Datsun Go+ CVT (78 PS (57 kW; 77 hp))
- 2018 Nissan Serena e-Power (Japan)
- 2020 Nissan Kicks e-Power
- 2021 Nissan Sylphy e-Power (China)
- 2021 Nissan Note e-power

=== HR14DET (Renault H4Jt) ===
1397 cc, 96 kW (130 PS) at 5500 rpm, 190 Nm at 2250 rpm. Bore: 78 mm (3.07 in); Stroke 73.1 mm (2.88 in).

- 2009–2013 Renault Mégane III
- 2009–2013 Renault Scénic III

=== HR14DDe ===
The HR14DDe is a 1.4 L (1,433 cc) naturally aspirated straight-3 engine. Bore: 78 mm (3.07 in); Stroke 100 mm (3.94 in); 12v DOHC; direct injection with variable valve timing. It produces 72 kW (97 hp; 98 PS) at 5,600 rpm and 123 N⋅m (91 lbf⋅ft). This engine is purposely built as a power generator for the electric motor.

- 2022–present Nissan Serena e-Power
- 2026–present Nissan Kicks e-Power

=== HR15DE (Renault H4K) ===
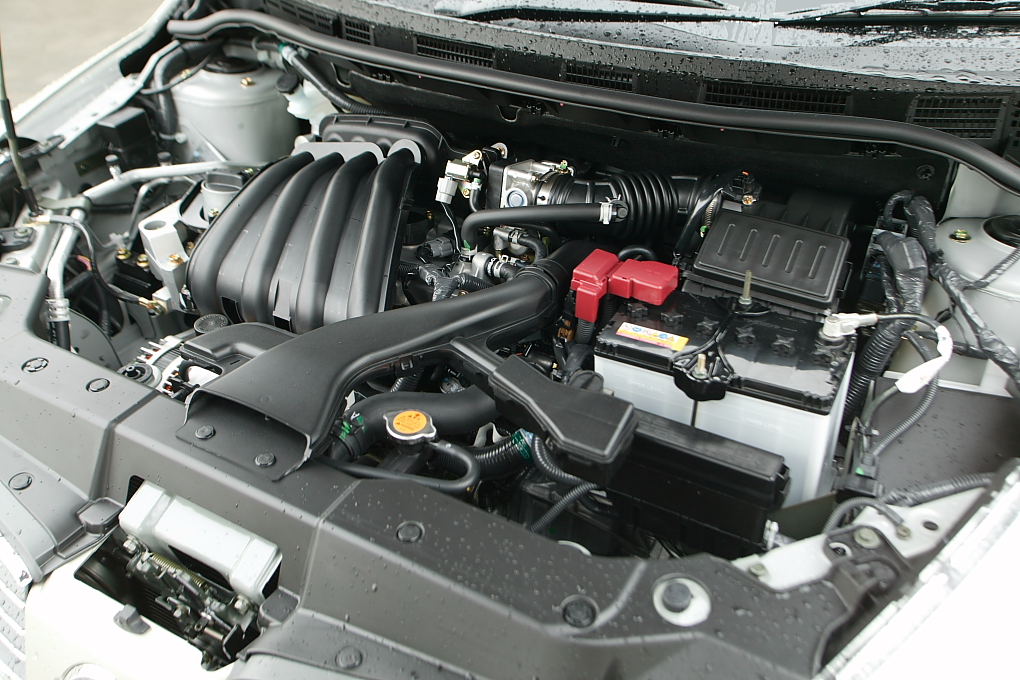
HR15DE installed in 2004 Tiida Latio

The HR15DE is a 1.5 L (1,498 cc) naturally aspirated straight-4 engine. Bore: 78 mm (3.07 in); Stroke 78.4 mm (3.09 in); 16 valve DOHC; EFI with variable valve timing. It produces 74 kW (99 hp; 101 PS) at 6000 rpm and 134.4 N⋅m (99 lbf⋅ft) at 4000 rpm and is fitted to the following vehicles:

- 2004–2012 Nissan Tiida C11
- 2004–2012 Nissan Note E11
- 2005–2008 Nissan Cube Z11/12
- 2005–2012 Nissan Bluebird Sylphy G11
- 2005–present Nissan Micra/March K12/13/14
- 2006–present Nissan NV150 AD Van/Wingroad NY12
- 2006–2019 Nissan Livina/Grand Livina L10/11
- 2007–2019 Mitsubishi Lancer Cargo/Mazda Familia Van NY12 (Japan)
- 2009–2018 Nissan Evalia (Indonesia)
- 2010–2019 Nissan Juke F15 (Japan and Indonesia)
- 2011–present Nissan Almera/Latio/Sunny N17/18
- 2012–2017 Renault Scala N17
- 2015–present Dacia/Renault Duster HS
- 2016–present Nissan Kicks P15 (Global)
- 2016–present Renault Captur/Kaptur GA
- 2019–present Nissan Kicks D15 (India)

=== HR16DE (Renault H4M) ===
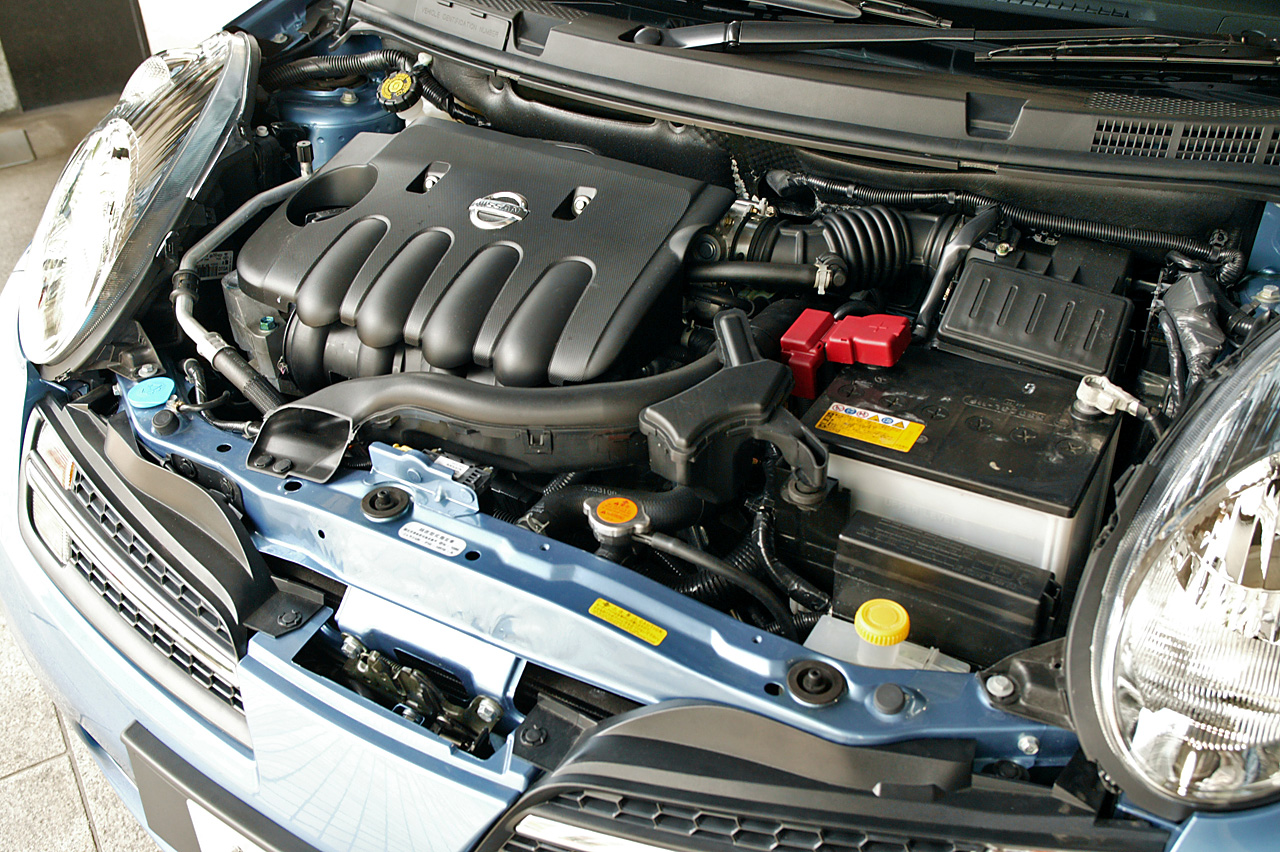
HR16DE installed in 2007 Micra C+C

The HR16DE is a 1.6 L (1,598 cc) naturally aspirated gasoline straight-4 engine, 16 valve DOHC; EFI; with variable valve timing. This engine has two fuel injectors per cylinder to improve fuel economy and reduce emissions. Bore: 78 mm (3.07 in); Stroke 83.6 mm (3.29 in). It produces 77 to 88 kW (103 to 118 hp; 105 to 120 PS) and 158 N⋅m (117 lbf⋅ft) at 4000 rpm.

A new version was developed for Renault hybrids (E-Tech); it produces 67 kW (90 hp; 91 PS) at 5600 rpm and 144 N⋅m (106 lbf⋅ft) at 3200 rpm.

In 2016, Nissan's skunkworks division, Autech, produced a limited run of Nissan March Autech Bolero models called the "A30", featuring an upgraded HR16DE engine. This hand built variant produced 148 hp (150ps) and 118 ft-lb (160N⋅m), with a redline of 7,100RPM. Upgrades included Autech camshafts, pistons, connecting rods, a new crankshaft, ported and polished intake ports, a freer flowing exhaust, an upgraded intake, and a re-tuned ECM. Only 30 examples were produced to commemorate Autech's 30th anniversary.

It is fitted to the following vehicles:

- 2004 Nissan Note/Versa Note E11, E12
- 2004 Nissan Versa/Tiida C11
- 2005–2018 Nissan Bluebird Sylphy G11
- 2005 Nissan Micra/March K12, K13, K14
- 2005 Nissan AD Van/Wingroad NY12
- 2006–2013 Nissan Qashqai J10/NJ10
- 2006–2019 Nissan Livina/Grand Livina L10, L11
- 2008– Renault Mégane MK3
- 2009–2016 Renault Fluence
- 2009–2019 Nissan NV200, also rebadged as Mitsubishi Delica D:3
- 2010 Nissan Juke F15 (Japan)
- 2011 Nissan Sunny/Latio N17
- 2012 Nissan Sylphy/Sentra B17, B18
- 2012–Present Nissan Versa/Almera (Americas) N17, N18
- 2015 Dacia Duster HS
- 2016 Nissan Kicks P15 (Global), D15 (India)
- 2017 Dacia Duster HM
- 2019 Lada Vesta
- 2019 Lada XRAY
- 2020 Nissan Sunny/Almera N18
- 2020 Renault Clio MK5 (HEV)
- 2020 Renault Mégane MK4 (PHEV)
- 2020 Renault Captur MK2 (PHEV)
- 2020 Renault Sandero (2020) LATAM
- 2021 Renault Arkana E-tech
- 2022 Nissan Juke Hybrid
- 2022 Mitsubishi ASX HEV 1.6
- 2023 Dacia Jogger Hybrid
- 2024 Dacia Duster Hybrid
- 2024 Renault Symbioz
- 2024 Mitsubishi Colt
- 2026 Nissan Kait

=== DE engine updates (2006–present) ===
Changes include:

- neutral idle control achieved through the coordinated control of the engine in tandem with the XTRONIC CVT
- introduction of alternator regenerative control mechanism
- Reduction of engine friction by machining the cam shaft to a crowning mirror-like finish and application of a fluorine coating to the chain guide
- Delayed valve closure timing of the intake, achieved through the increased conversion angle of C-VTC and superior timing management, thus reducing pumping loss when idling
- Lower idling speed

The improved HR15DE engines were first used in Nissan Cube, Nissan Cube Cubic, Nissan Note, Nissan Tiida, Nissan Tiida Latio and Nissan Wingroad sold since December 25, 2006.

=== HR12DDR ===
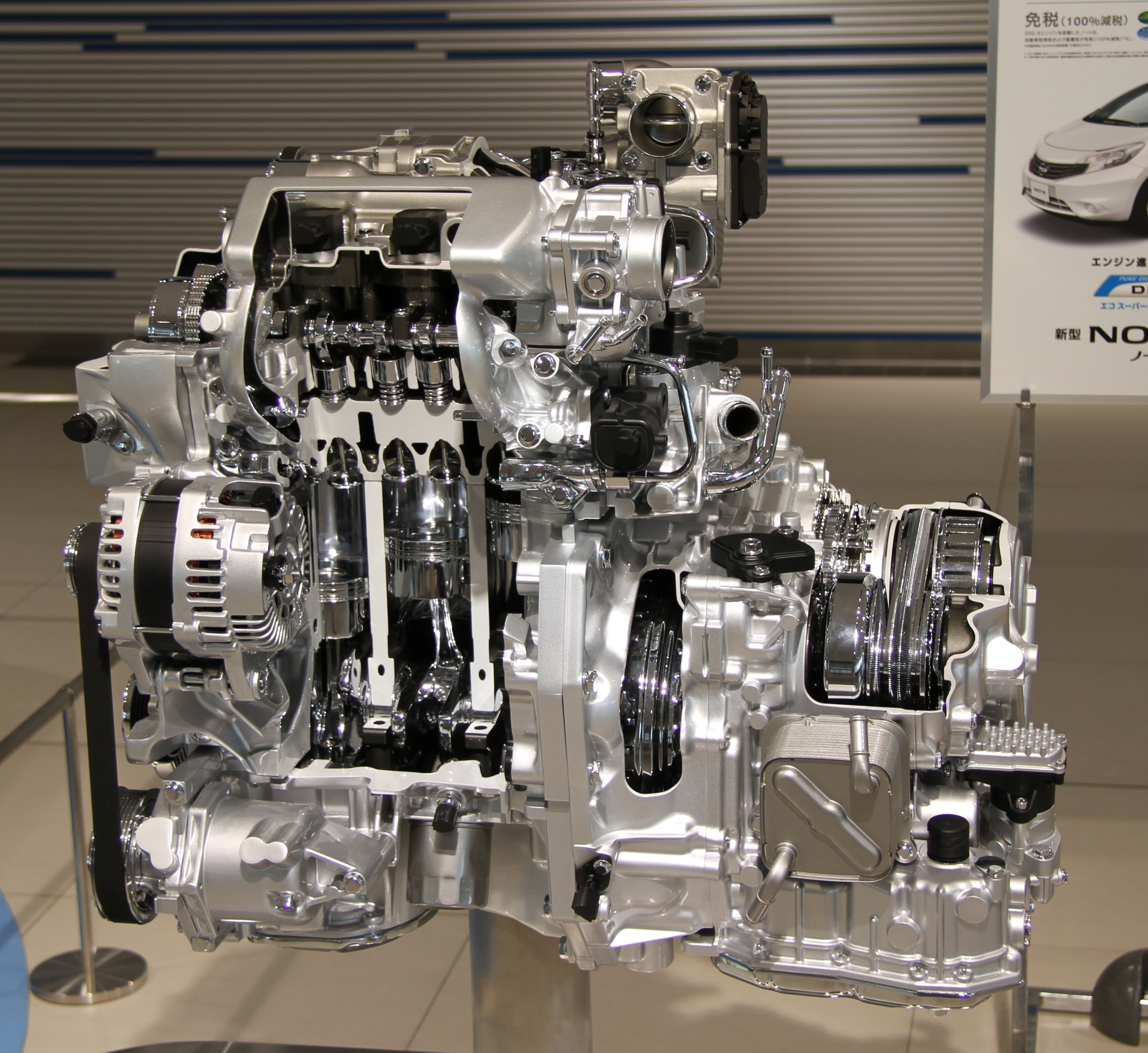
Nissan HR12DDR

The HR12DDR is a 1.2 L (1,198 cc) supercharged straight-3 engine, equipped with timing chain and direct injection. The engine dimensions are the same as for the HR12DE. It produces 72 kW (98 PS; 97 hp) and 143 N⋅m (105 lb⋅ft). Designed for small-car applications, this gasoline engine incorporates a variety of technologies to minimize CO_{2} emissions while providing practical levels of power output.

Some of the pertinent features are:

- Compression ratio of 13.0:1
- Continuous Variable Valve Timing Control System (CVTCS)
- Direct Injection Gasoline (DIG)
- Miller cycle
- Supercharged
- Variable capacity oil pump
- Hydrogen-free, diamond like carbon (DLC) coated valve lifters and piston rings
- Sodium filled exhaust valves
- High efficiency

It is fitted to the following vehicles:

- 2010 Nissan Micra
- 2012 Nissan Note

=== HR18DDh ===
The HR18DDh is an approx. 1.8 L (1,798 cc) naturally aspirated gasoline straight-4 engine developed by Renault for the second generation of E-Tech Small. Based on the HR16DE it replaces, It made its first appearance in 2025 and is Euro7 compatible. Like the HR16, it can be fitted on all CMF-B vehicles. The engine started being sold as the Horse Powertrains HR18 in 2025.

The engine produces 80 kW (107 hp; 109 PS) at 5,750 rpm and 172 N⋅m (127 lb⋅ft) of torque at 4,000 rpm and is used alongside a 36 kW (48 hp; 49 PS) traction motor and a 15 kW (20 hp; 20 PS) starter-generator motor with a 230 V 1.4 kWh battery for a total of 158 hp (118 kW; 160 PS). Compared to the previous H4M engine, it has direct injection and Atkinson cycle to improve thermal efficiency. The improved performance allows the 0–100 km/h (62 mph) acceleration time of the Captur E-tech to drop to 8.9 seconds compared to 10.6 seconds of the previous E-tech, while reducing fuel consumption from 4.7 to 4.3 L/100 km (50 to 55 mpg_{‑US}). Towing capacity also increases from 750–1,000 kg (1,650–2,200 lb).

It will be fitted to the following vehicles:

- 2025 Renault Captur
- 2025 Renault Symbioz
- 2025 Dacia Bigster
- 2026 Renault Clio
- 2026 Dacia Duster
- 2026 Dacia Jogger

== 75.5 mm series ==
- three-cylinder layout with direct fuel injection
- introduced in 2022 on Renault cars

=== HR12DDV (Renault HR12) ===
The HR12DDV is a 1.2 L (1,199 cc) all-aluminium direct injected and variable geometry turbocharged straight-three engine 48V mHEV equipped with lifetime timing chain, 12v DOHC, VVT, variable displacement oil pump, electric driven water pump, with Bore Spray Coating, Stop-Start, and regenerative braking, Bore and stroke are 75.5 and 89.3 mm (2.97 and 3.52 in) respectively. It produces between 130 hp (96 kW) with 205 N⋅m (151 lbf⋅ft) for the E-Tech version; 230 N⋅m (170 lbf⋅ft) for normal version, to 150 hp (110 kW) with 230 N⋅m (170 lbf⋅ft) depending on the application. Renault marketing names for these engines are TCe 130, TCe 150 (on the Grand Austral) and E-Tech 200.

It is fitted to the following vehicles:

- 2022 Renault Austral
- 2023 Renault Espace
- 2024 Renault Rafale
- 2024 Dacia Duster
- 2024 Dacia Bigster
- 2025 Renault Captur
- 2025 Dacia Sandero (without hybrid motors, 115-122hp)

== 72.2 mm series ==
- most of the engines were first seen in Renault or Mercedes-Benz cars
- three and four-cylinder layouts with direct fuel injection except HR09DET, HR10DE and HR10DET
- designed specifically for turbocharged application, with thicker cylinder walls than the 78 mm bore variants
- introduced in 2013 on Renault cars

=== HR12DDT / HRA2 (Renault H5Ft) ===
The HR12DDT is a 1.2 L (1,197 cc) all-aluminium direct injected and turbocharged straight-four engine equipped with lifetime timing chain, 16v DOHC, VVT, variable displacement oil pump, Stop-Start and regenerative braking, Bore: 72.2 mm (2.84 in), Stroke 73.1 mm (2.88 in). It produces two choices, 85 kW (114 hp; 116 PS) at 4500 or 5000 or 6000 rpm with 190 N⋅m (140 lbf⋅ft) at 1900–4000 rpm and 97 kW (130 hp; 132 PS) at 5000–5500; rpm with 205 N⋅m (151 lbf⋅ft) at 2000–3000 rpm depending on the application. Renault marketing names for these engines are TCe115, TCe120, TCe125, and TCe130.

It is fitted to the following vehicles:

- 2012-2020 Renault Clio IV
- 2013–2018 Renault Captur I
- 2013–2016 Renault Mégane III
- 2013–2016 Renault Scenic III
- 2013–2018 Nissan Qashqai II
- 2014–2020 Renault Kangoo II
- 2014–2018 Nissan Juke I
- 2015–2018 Nissan Pulsar C13
- 2015–2018 Renault Kadjar
- 2016–2018 Renault Mégane IV
- 2016–2018 Renault Scenic IV
- 2017–2019 Dacia Duster (HM)

This engine has been plagued by abnormal oil consumption.

=== HR10DE (Renault H4D) ===
The HR10DE is a 1.0 L (999 cc) multi point injected, naturally aspirated, straight-3 engine. It produces 45 to 52 kW (60 to 70 hp; 61 to 71 PS) at 6000 rpm and 91 N⋅m (67 lbf⋅ft) at 2850 rpm.

- 2014–2019 Renault Twingo SCe 75
- 2014–2019 Smart Fortwo and Smart Forfour (as Mercedes-Benz M281 engine)
- 2017 Nissan Micra K14 1.0, IG 71
- 2019– Renault Twingo SCe 65
- 2019– Renault Clio SCe
- 2021 Dacia Logan III SCe 65
- 2021 Dacia Sandero III SCe 65

=== HR09DET (Renault H4Bt) ===
The H4Bt is a 0.9 L (898 cc) multi point injected, turbocharged, straight-3 engine. It produces 66 kW (89 hp; 90 PS) at 5500 rpm and 135 to 140 N⋅m (100 to 103 lbf⋅ft) at 2250–2500 rpm. A 110 hp version was available in the Twingo GT (2016–2018).

- 2012–2020 Renault Clio TCe 90
- 2013–2021 Dacia Sandero TCe 90
- 2013–2021 Dacia Logan TCe 90
- 2013–2020 Renault Captur TCe 90
- 2014– Renault Twingo TCe 90/95 and GT (TCe 110)
- 2014–2019 Smart Fortwo and Smart Forfour (as Mercedes-Benz M281 engine)
- 2017–2019 Nissan Micra K14 0.9 Turbo, IG-T 90

=== HR13DDT (Renault H5Ht / Mercedes-Benz M282) ===
The HR13DDT is a 1.3 L (1,332 cc) all-aluminium direct injected and turbocharged straight-four engine equipped with lifetime timing chain, 16v DOHC, VVT, variable displacement oil pump, Stop-Start, regenerative braking, and Bore Spray Coating system (as installed in Nissan GT-R models), Bore: 72.2 mm (2.84 in), Stroke 81.3 mm (3.20 in). There are three different versions: 85 kW (114 hp; 116 PS) at 4500 rpm with 220 N⋅m (162 lbf⋅ft) at 1500–3500 rpm, 103 kW (138 hp; 140 PS) at 5000 rpm with 240 N⋅m (177 lbf⋅ft) at 1600–3600 rpm, and 117 kW (157 hp; 159 PS) at 5500 rpm with 270 N⋅m (199 lbf⋅ft) at 1800–3500 rpm depending on the application. Renault brands for these engines are TCe115, TCe140 and TCe160. This engine tests WLTP proof (Euro 6c). This engine is also rebranded as a Mercedes-Benz under the name "M282", adding cylinder deactivation technology. It is fitted to the following vehicles:

- 2018 Mercedes-Benz A-Class
- 2019 Mercedes-Benz B-Class
- 2019 Mercedes-Benz CLA-Class
- 2020 Mercedes-Benz GLA-Class
- 2020 Mercedes-Benz GLB-Class
- 2018 Nissan Qashqai II
- 2018 Renault Mégane IV
- 2018 Renault Scénic / Grand Scénic IV
- 2019 Nissan X-Trail III
- 2019 Renault Arkana (Russia)
- 2019 Renault Captur I + II
- 2019 Renault Clio V
- 2019 Renault Kadjar
- 2019 Renault Talisman
- 2020 Dacia Duster II (HM)
- 2020 Renault Samsung XM3/Renault Arkana/Renault Megane Conquest
- 2020 Nissan Kicks (India, D15)
- 2020 Renault Kaptur (Russia)
- 2020 Renault Koleos II
- 2021 Nissan Qashqai III
- 2021 Renault Kangoo III /Nissan Townstar / Mercedes-Benz Citan / Mercedes-Benz T-Class
- 2022 Renault Austral
- 2026 Nissan Tekton
- 2025 Renault Duster III (Australia, Ukraine as TCe 150, Turkey as TCe 145, in India as TCe 160)

=== HR10DET / HRA0 (Renault H4Dt) ===
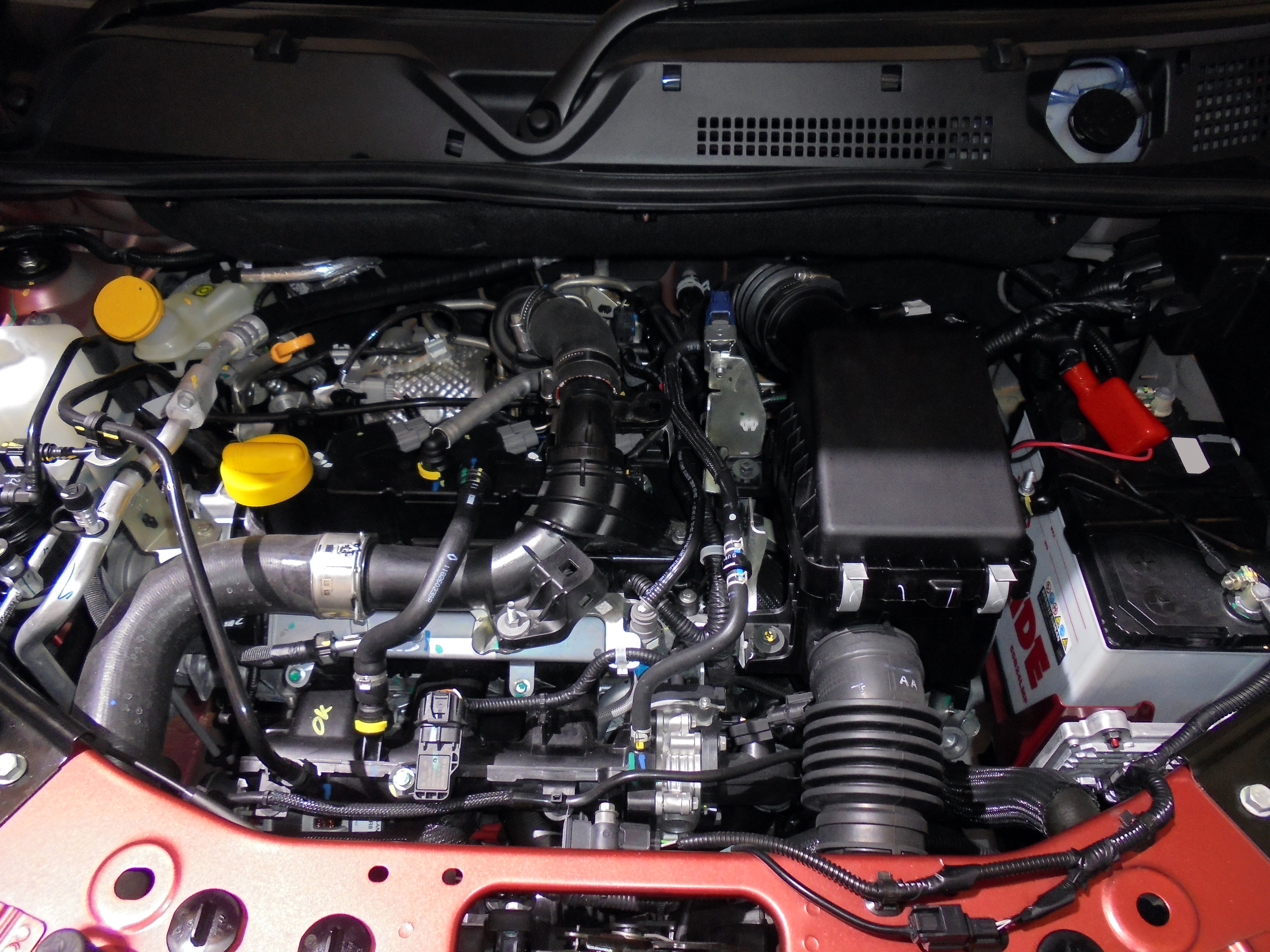
HRA0 in the 2021 Magnite

The HR10DET is a 1.0 L (999 cc) multi point injected, turbocharged, straight-three engine with a 72.2 mm (2.84 in) bore and an 81.3 mm (3.20 in) stroke. It produces 74 kW (100 PS; 99 hp) at 5000 rpm and 160 N⋅m (118 lbf⋅ft) at 1750 rpm. This engine is also available as a LPG version. Maximum power is unchanged but torque is 170 N⋅m (125 lbf⋅ft) at 2000 rpm.

- 2019 Nissan Almera (N18) 152 Nm
- 2019 Nissan Micra K14 IG-T 100
- 2019 Renault Clio V TCe 100
- 2020 Renault Captur II
- 2021 Dacia Logan III TCe 90 / ECO-G 100
- 2021 Dacia Sandero III TCe 90 / ECO-G 100
- 2021 Nissan Magnite
- 2021 Renault Kiger TCe
- 2021 Renault Triber TCe
- 2022 Dacia Jogger TCe 100 / ECO-G 100

=== HR10DDT / HRA1 / Renault H5Dt ===
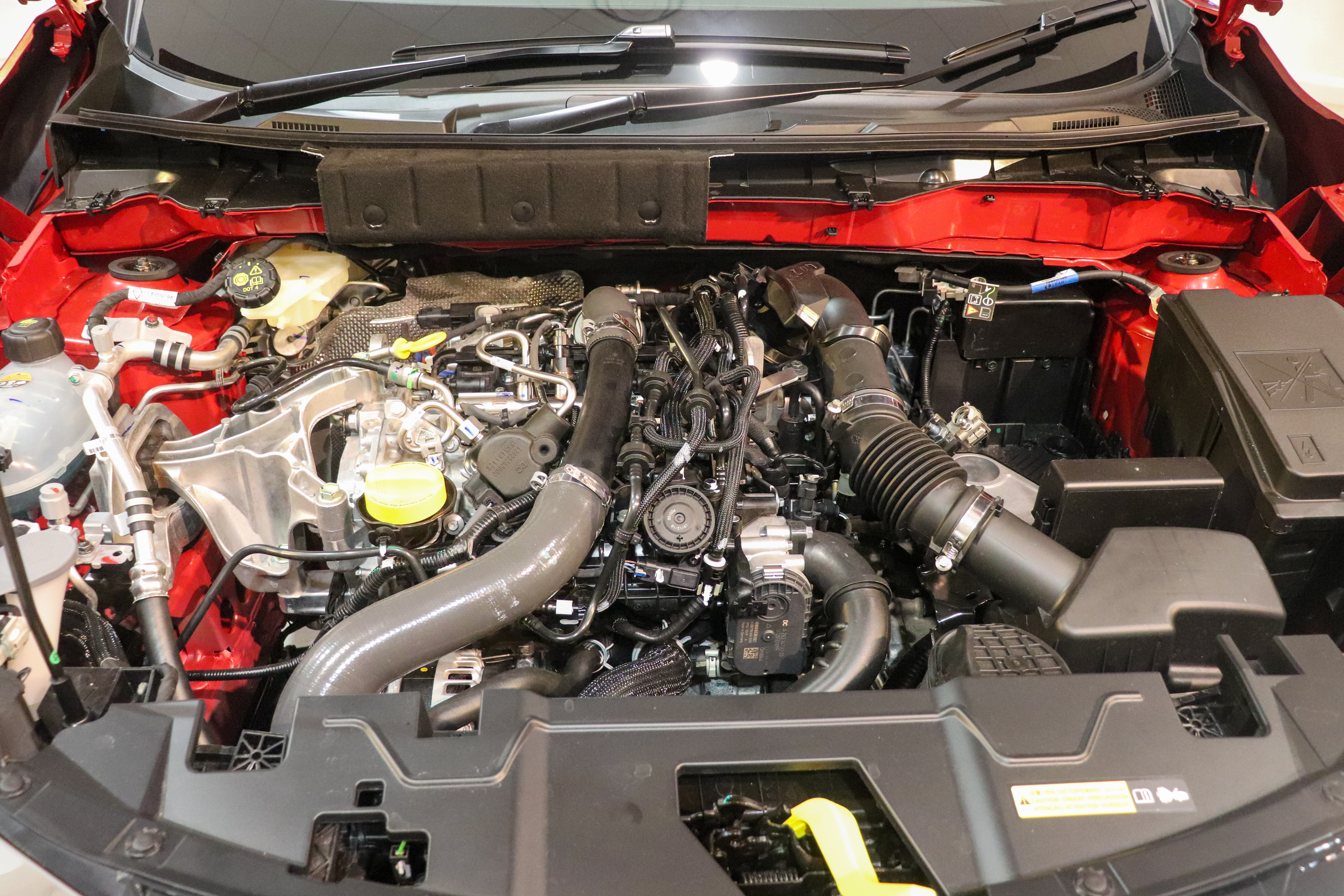
HR10DDT in the 2019 Juke

The HR10DDT is a 1.0 L (999 cc) direct injected, turbocharged, straight-3 engine. It produces 85 or 86 kW (114 or 115 hp; 116 or 117 PS) at 5000 rpm or 5250 rpm and 200 N⋅m (148 lbf⋅ft) at 2750 rpm or 180 to 200 N⋅m (133 to 148 lbf⋅ft) at 1750–4000 rpm.

- 2019 Nissan Juke II
- 2020 Renault Mégane sedan
- 2022 Dacia Jogger TCe 110
- 2023 Dacia Sandero Stepway TCe 110
- 2024 Renault Kardian (Brazil) TCe 125 - Brazilian version has a Unique local flex fuel configuration combinated with 6MT transmission.

== See also ==
- List of Nissan engines
- List of Renault engines
