= Nissan Kicks =

Subcompact crossover SUV

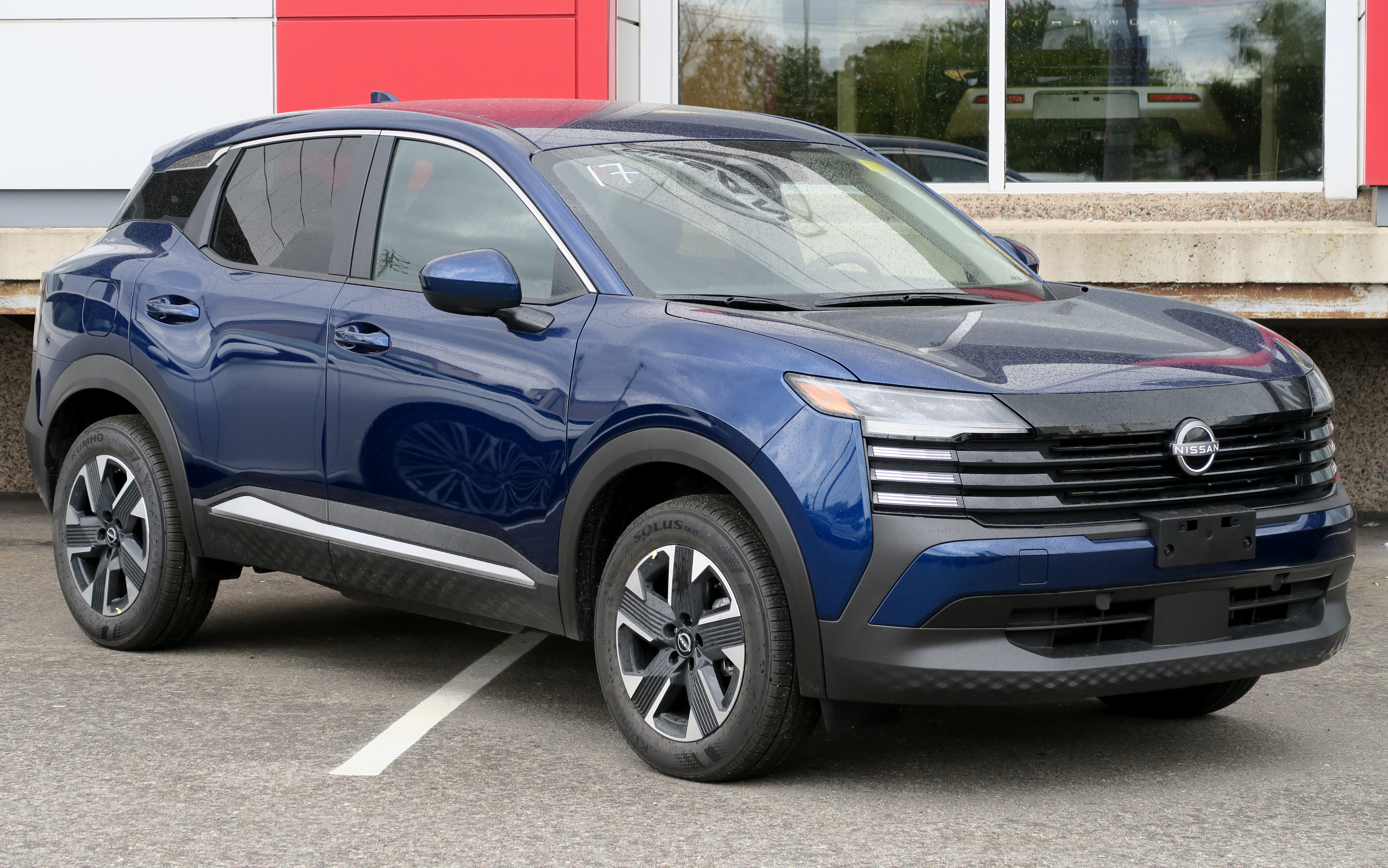
- Second-generation Kicks SV (P16)

Overview
- Manufacturer: Nissan
- Production: 2016–present
- Model years: 2018–present (North America)

Body and chassis
- Class: Subcompact crossover SUV (B)
- Body style: 5-door SUV

Chronology
- Predecessor: Nissan Juke (F15) (Americas & Asia); Nissan Livina C-Gear/X-Gear (China & Taiwan)

The Nissan Kicks (Japanese: 日産・キックス, Hepburn: Nissan Kikkusu) is a subcompact crossover SUV produced by Nissan since 2016. The crossover was initially introduced as a concept car under the same name and was premiered at the 2014 São Paulo International Motor Show. Nissan claimed the concept is inspired by the streets of Brazil.

The first-generation, V platform-based Kicks debuted in São Paulo, Brazil in mid-2016 with the P15 chassis code. The car was designed collaboratively by Nissan's design headquarters in Atsugi, Japan, Nissan Design America (NDA) in San Diego, California, and Nissan Design America Rio de Janeiro. The first-generation Kicks was then gradually rolled out across Latin America, then it entered the United States and Canada in 2018 to replace the Juke as the subcompact crossover offering in both countries.

The B0 platform-based Kicks was introduced in India in January 2019 with the D15 chassis code. The company stated the vehicle is built on the platform to reduce production costs. It is slightly larger than the V platform-based Kicks, and retained the same wheelbase as the first-generation Dacia Duster and the B0 platform-based Renault Captur. The D15 Kicks ceased production in 2023.

The second-generation Kicks was introduced for the North American market in March 2024.

== First generation (P15/D15; 2016) ==
=== Global market (P15; 2016) ===
First generation (global)
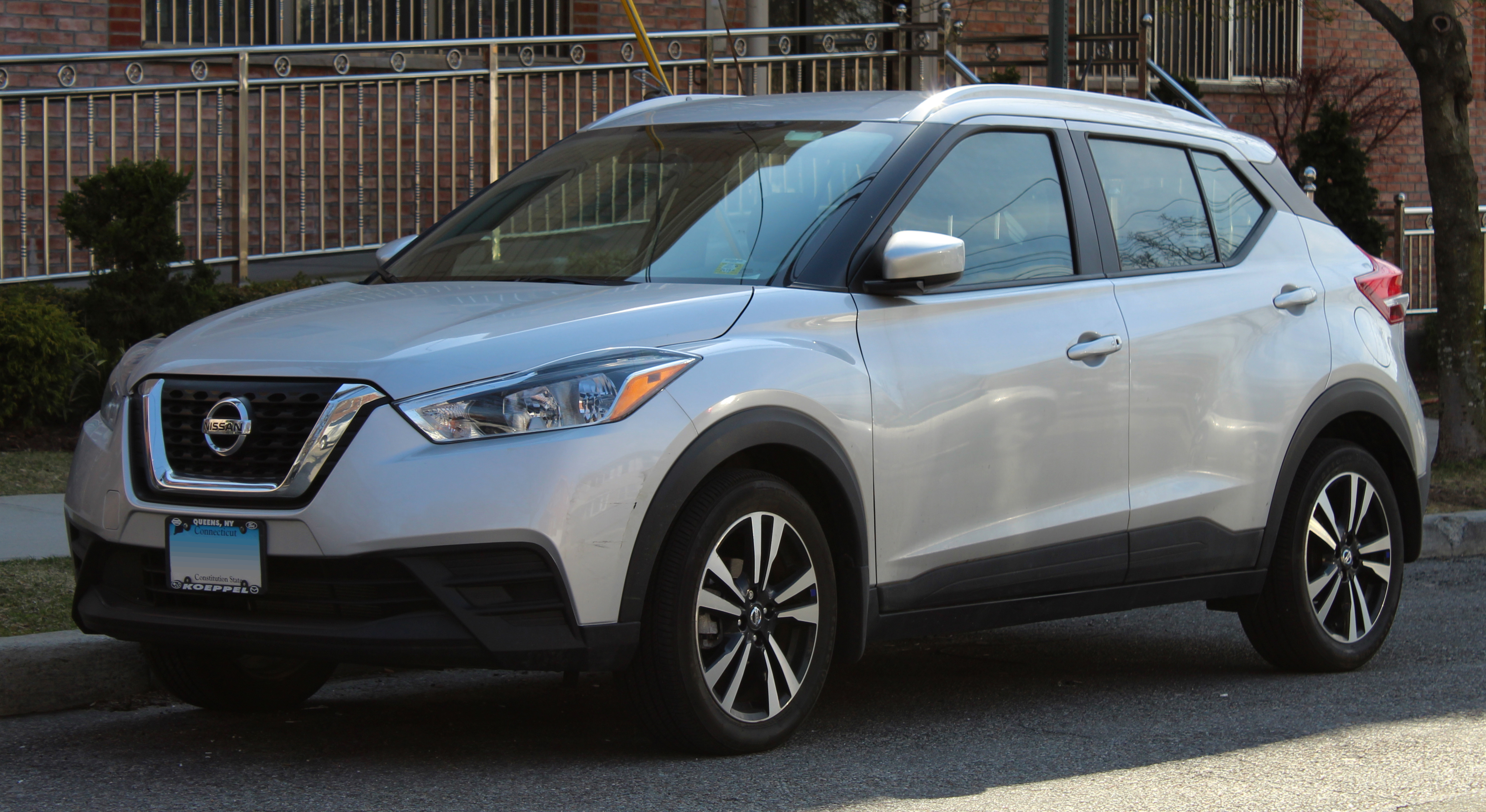
- 2018 Nissan Kicks SV (P15, US)

Overview
- Model code: P15
- Also called: Nissan Kait (Brazil, 2026–present)
- Production: 2016–present
- Model years: 2018–2025 (North America)
- Assembly: Brazil: Resende, Rio de Janeiro; Mexico: Aguascalientes (Nissan Mexicana, A1); China: Guangzhou (Dongfeng Nissan); Taiwan: Miaoli; Thailand: Samut Prakan (NMT, e-Power)
- Designer: Boson Huang, Hiren Patel

Body and chassis
- Layout: Front-engine, front-wheel-drive; Front-engine, all-wheel-drive (Japan)
- Platform: Nissan V platform
- Related: Nissan Almera/Sunny/Versa (N18); Nissan Micra (K14); Renault Captur I

Powertrain
- Engine: Petrol: 1.5 L HR15DE I4; 1.6 L HR16DE I4; Petrol hybrid: 1.2 L HR12DE e-Power I3 (generator only)
- Electric motor: EM57 High Power 96 kW (129 hp; 131 PS), 260 N⋅m (190 lb⋅ft) AC3 synchronous (e-Power); EM47 High Power 100 kW (134 hp; 136 PS), 280 N⋅m (210 lb⋅ft) AC3 synchronous (e-Power; Thailand/Japan); MM48 50 kW (67 hp; 68 PS), 100 N⋅m (74 lb⋅ft) AC3 synchronous (e-Power 4WD-rear; Japan)
- Transmission: 5-speed manual; X-Tronic CVT; Single speed constant ratio (e-Power)
- Hybrid drivetrain: Series hybrid (e-Power)
- Battery: 1.57–2.06 kWh Panasonic lithium-ion (e-Power)

Dimensions
- Wheelbase: 2,610–2,620 mm (102.8–103.1 in)
- Length: 4,295–4,305 mm (169.1–169.5 in)
- Width: 1,760 mm (69.3 in)
- Height: 1,590 mm (62.6 in)
- Kerb weight: 1,109–1,164 kg (2,445–2,566 lb); 1,340–1,350 kg (2,954–2,976 lb) (e-Power)

Chronology
- Successor: Nissan Kait (Brazil)

Originally unveiled as a concept in 2014, the Nissan Kicks was showcased across Brazil during summer 2016 to promote the Summer Olympics, of which Nissan was a lead sponsor. The crossover went on sale in China in July 2017, replacing the Livina C-Gear.

The Kicks made the North American debut on 29 November 2017 at the Los Angeles Auto Show and was slated to be on sale in June 2018. Imported from Mexico, it replaced the Juke and also indirectly replaced the Versa Note as a subcompact hatchback offering in the region. The Kicks was launched in the Middle East in December 2017.

The Kicks features a standard touchscreen audio system with Bluetooth for hands-free calling and wireless stereo audio streaming, as well as USB integration and a rearview backup camera display. Up-level models also offer an upgraded infotainment system Apple CarPlay and Android Auto smartphone integration, as well as a Bose premium amplified audio system that features small speakers mounted in the front headrests.

In August 2024, the Kicks in Mexico and Canada continued to be sold alongside the new model as the Kicks Play. The Play model went on sale in the U.S. in early 2025, and was discontinued after the 2025 model year.

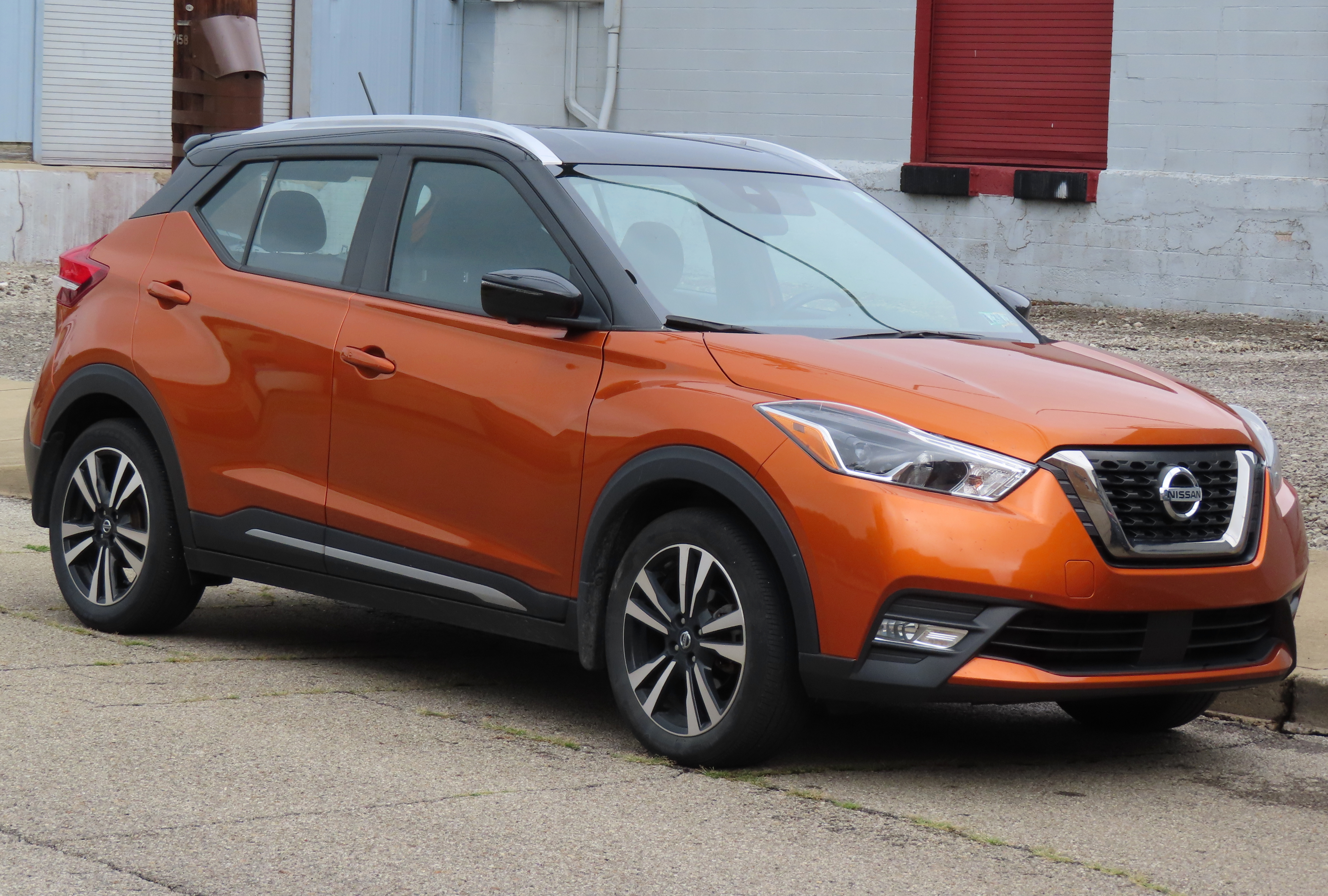
2020 Nissan Kicks SR (P15, US)

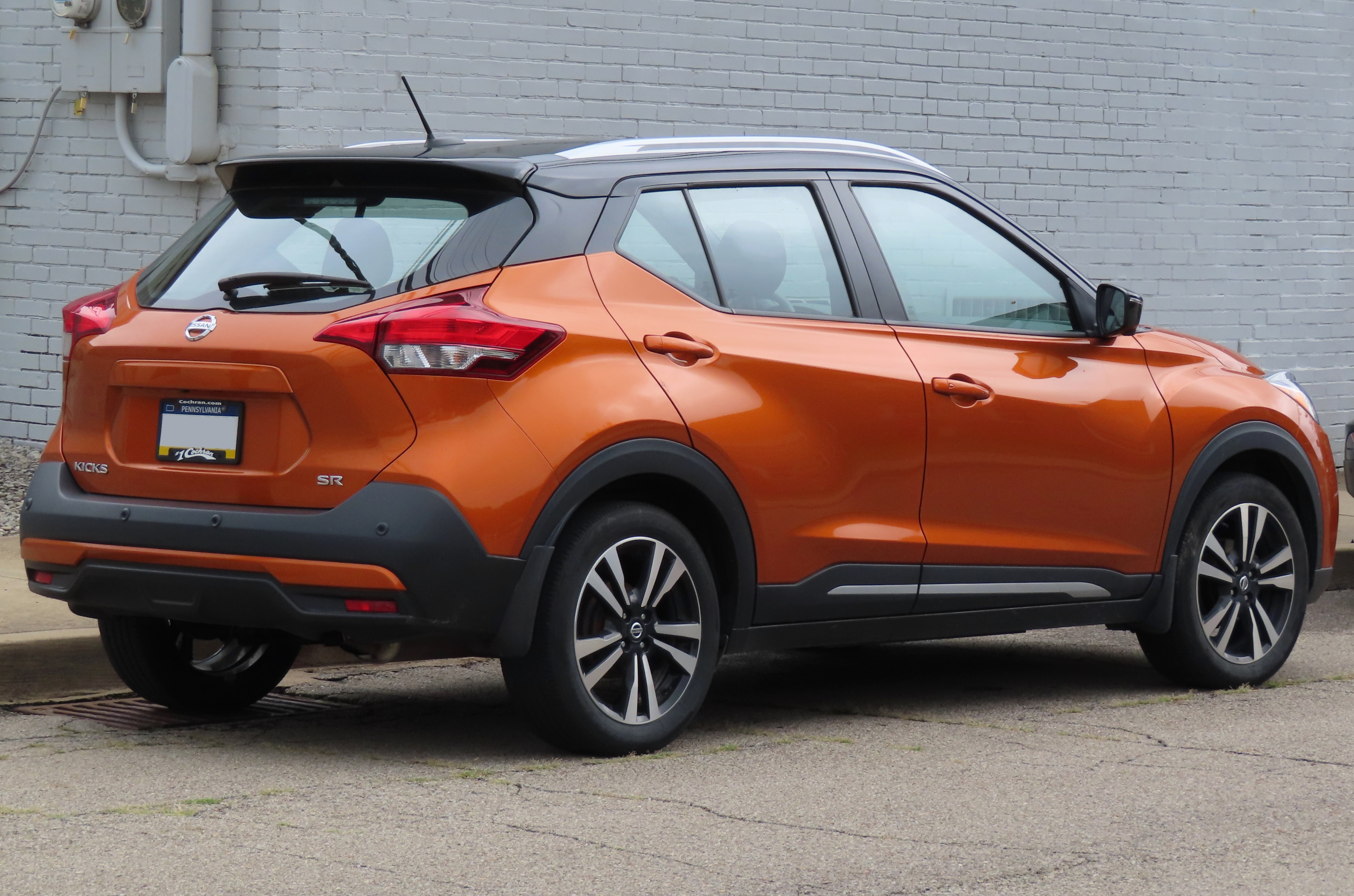
2020 Nissan Kicks SR (P15, US)

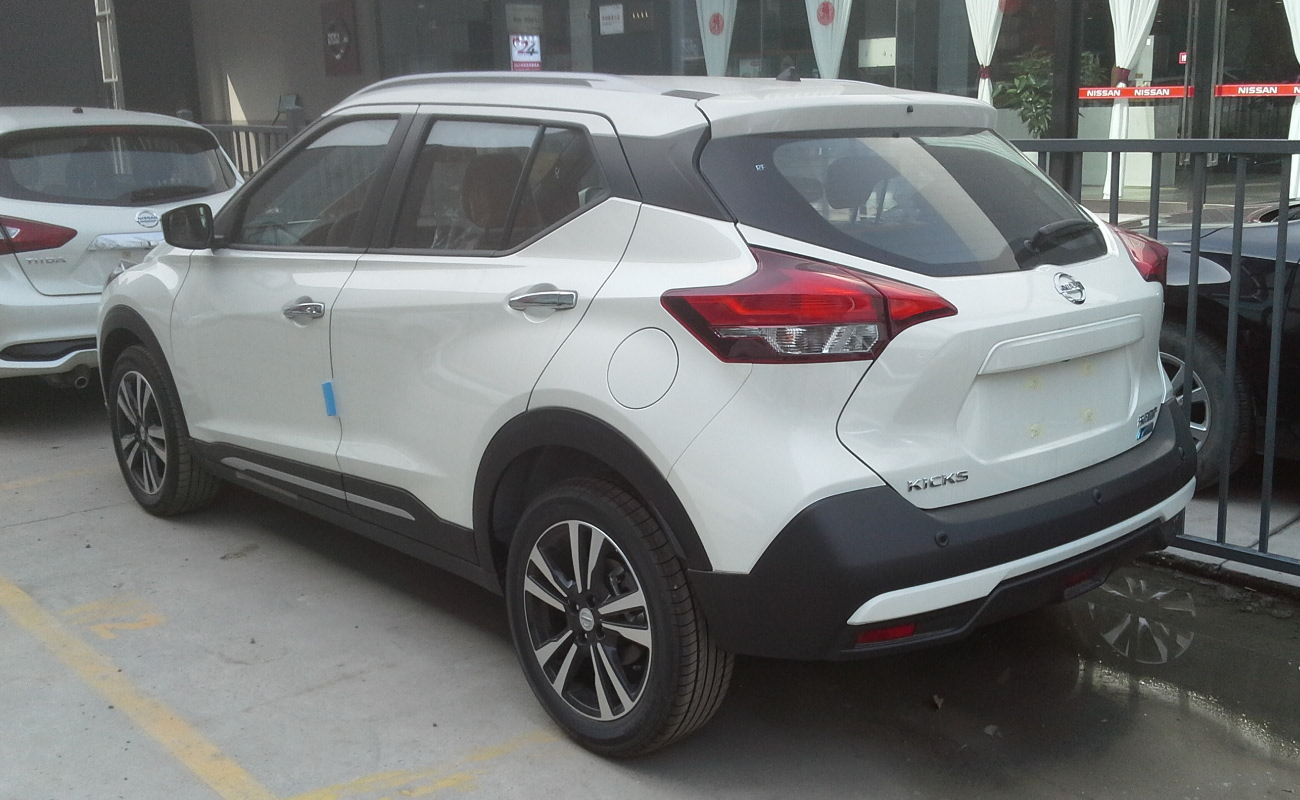
2018 Nissan Kicks 1.5 (P15, China)

==== Kicks e-Power ====
On 15 May 2020, the Kicks e-Power was released in Thailand. Only produced in Thailand, the variant features an updated look with reworked front fascia and tail lights. The Kicks e-Power combines a HR12DE 1.2-litre 3-cylinder petrol engine and an EM57 electric motor that drives the front wheels, making it a series hybrid vehicle with no plug-in capability.

Since June 2022, all-wheel drive is available by the addition of a MM48 motor as an option for the Japanese market.

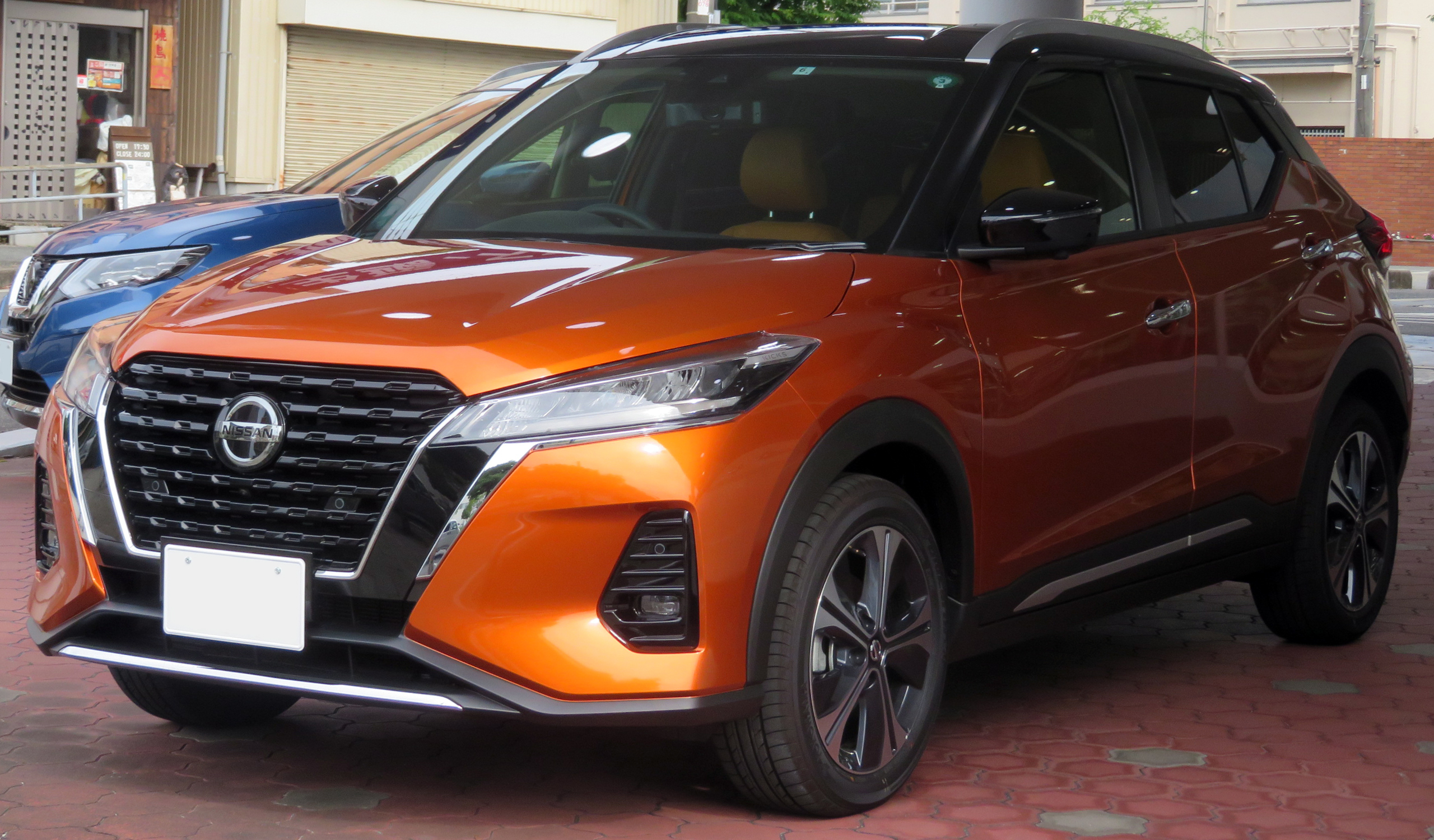
2020 Nissan Kicks e-Power X (P15, Japan)

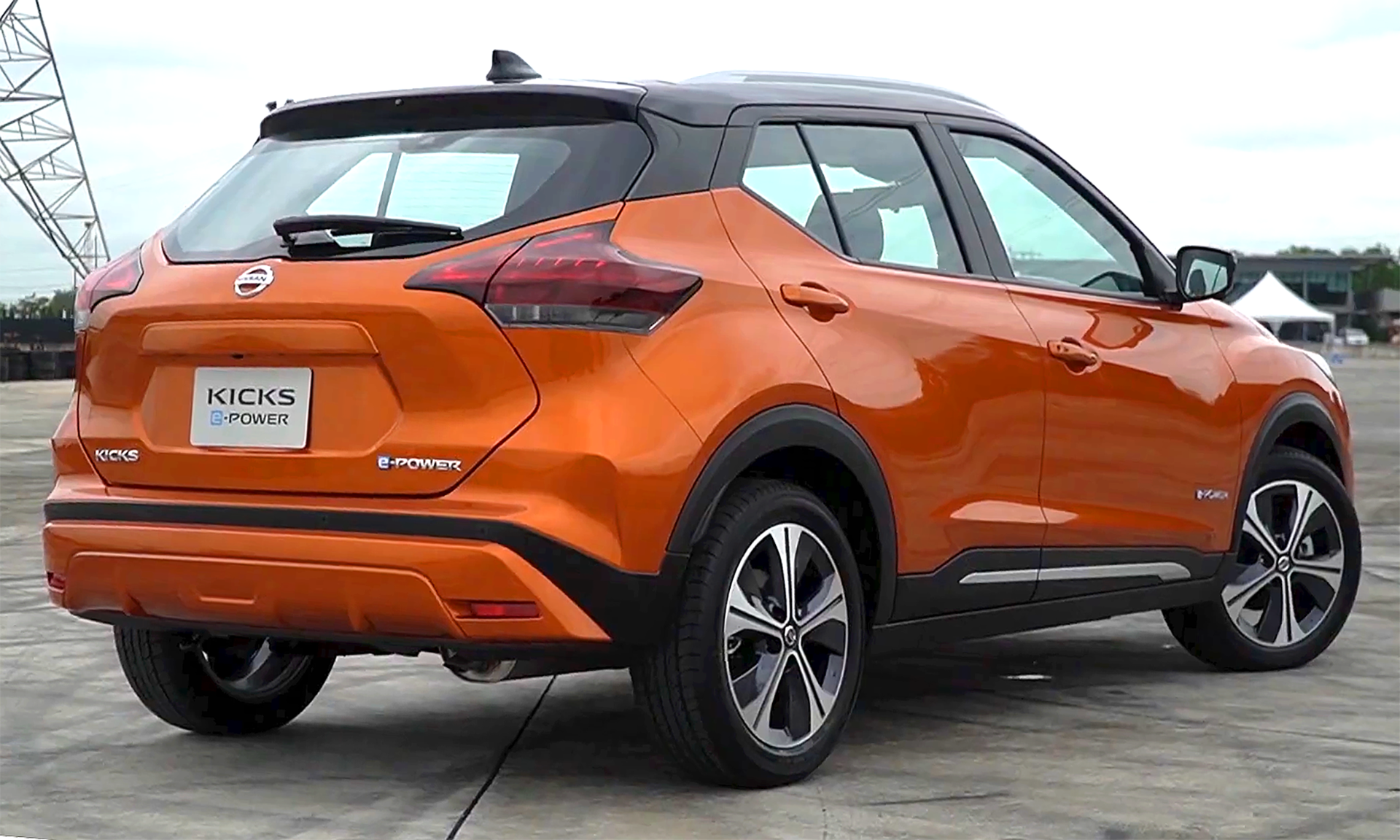
2020 Nissan Kicks e-Power VL (P15, Thailand)

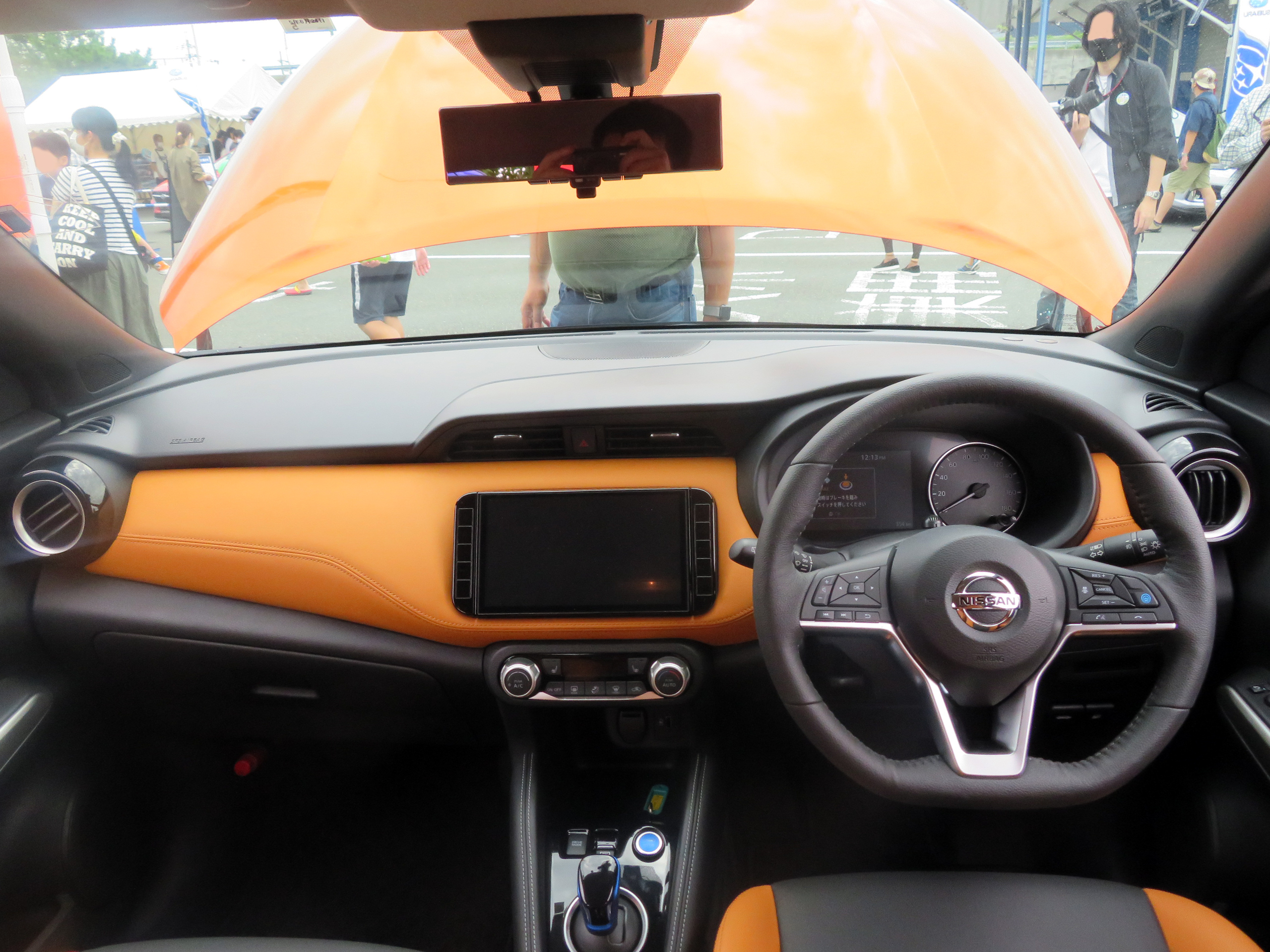
Interior

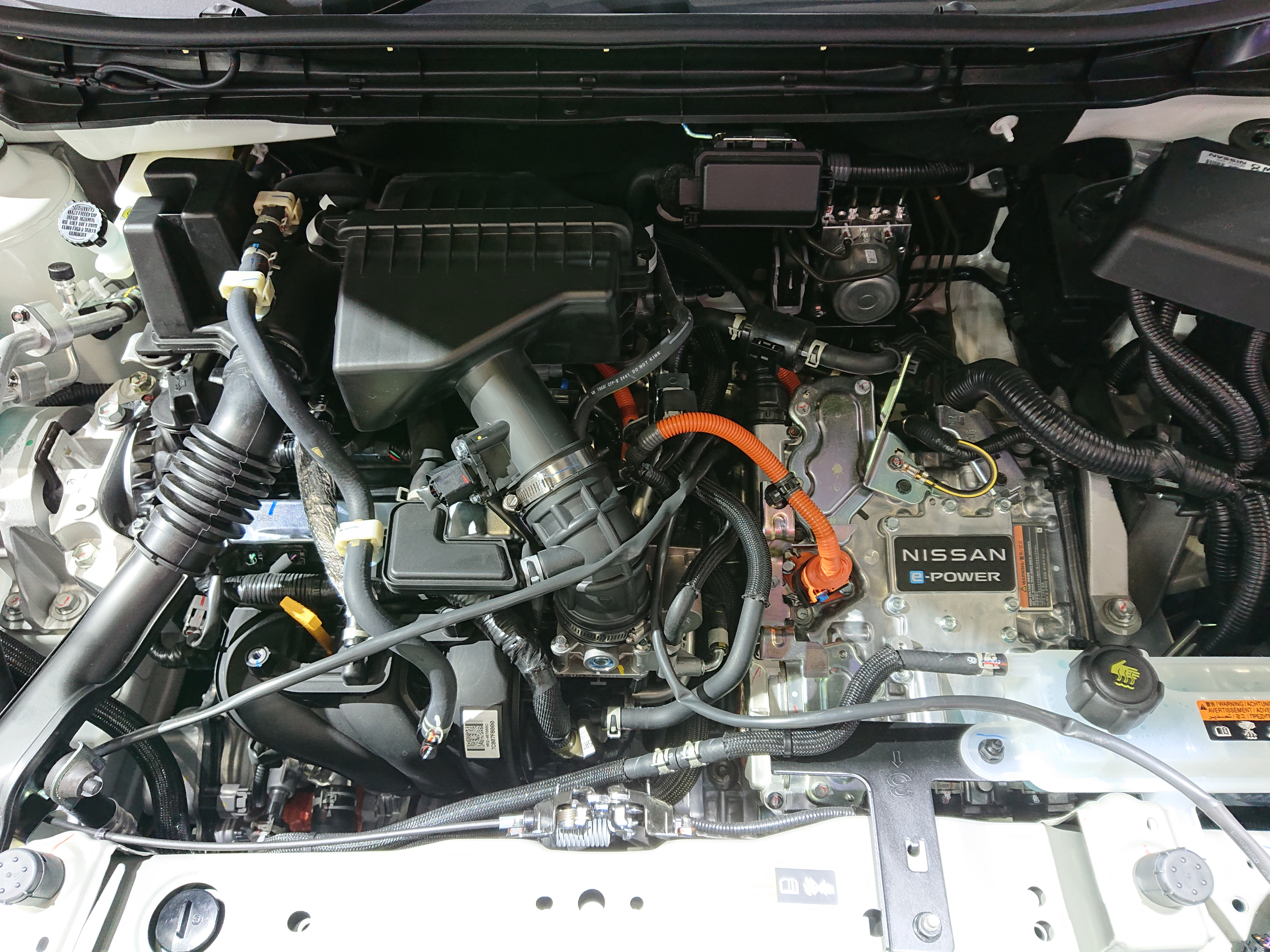
Nissan HR12DE engine with EM47 electric motor

==== 2021 facelift ====
An updated version of the standard Kicks was revealed in December 2020. The front fascia was made identical to the Kicks e-Power that was launched earlier, with a larger grille and LED headlights. The rear fascia received minor updates, mostly to the bumper. Inside, the 2021 Kicks received upgrades including a centre armrest, larger touchscreen, and an electronic parking brake. Apple CarPlay and Android Auto smartphone integration is standard. Trim levels and powertrain are unchanged. The suspension for the 2021 Kicks, which features an independent front strut with rear twin-tube shock absorbers, is also identical to the previous 2020 model. The updated Kicks went on sale in North America in February 2021 and in the Middle East in July 2021.

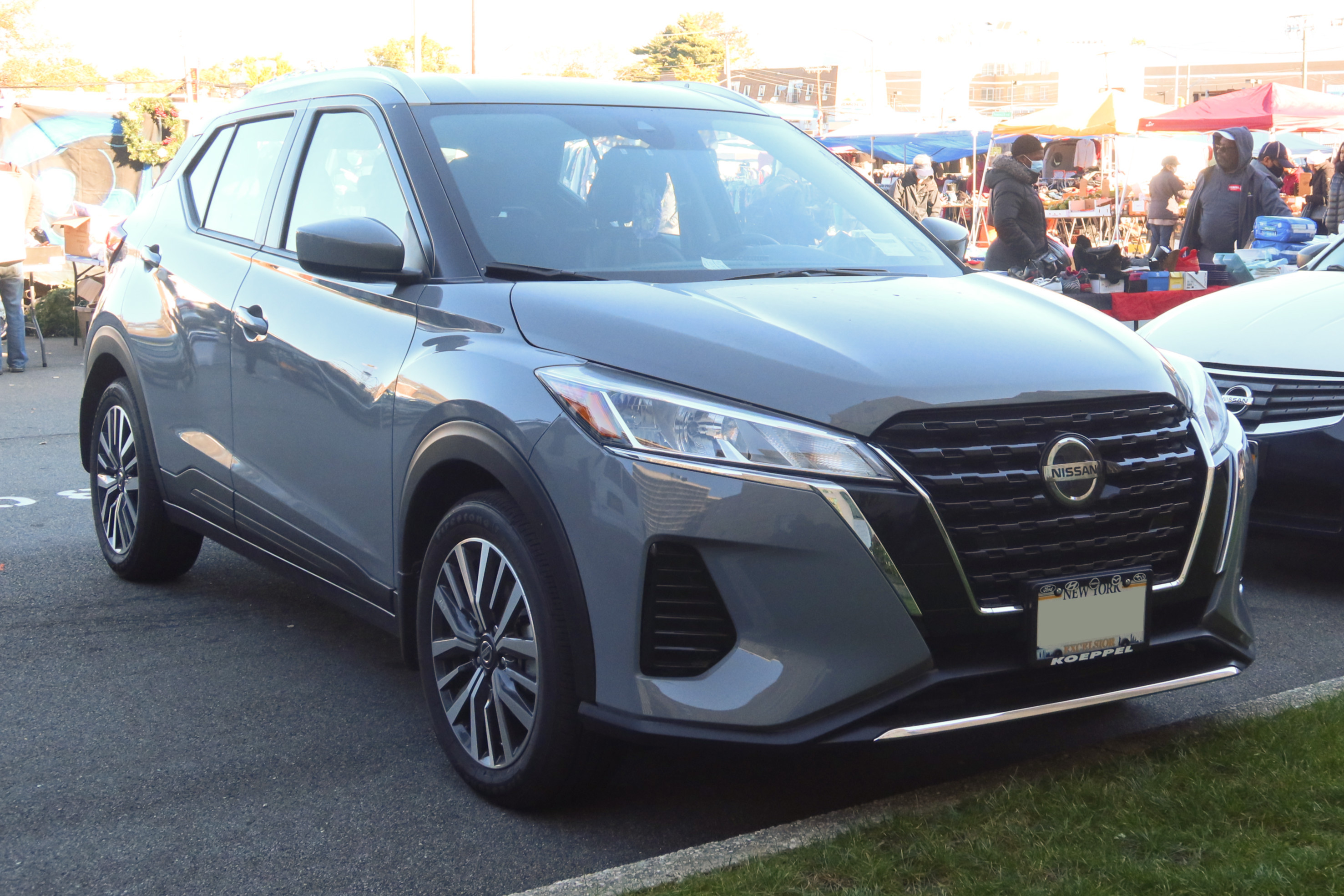
2021 Kicks SV (P15; US, facelift)

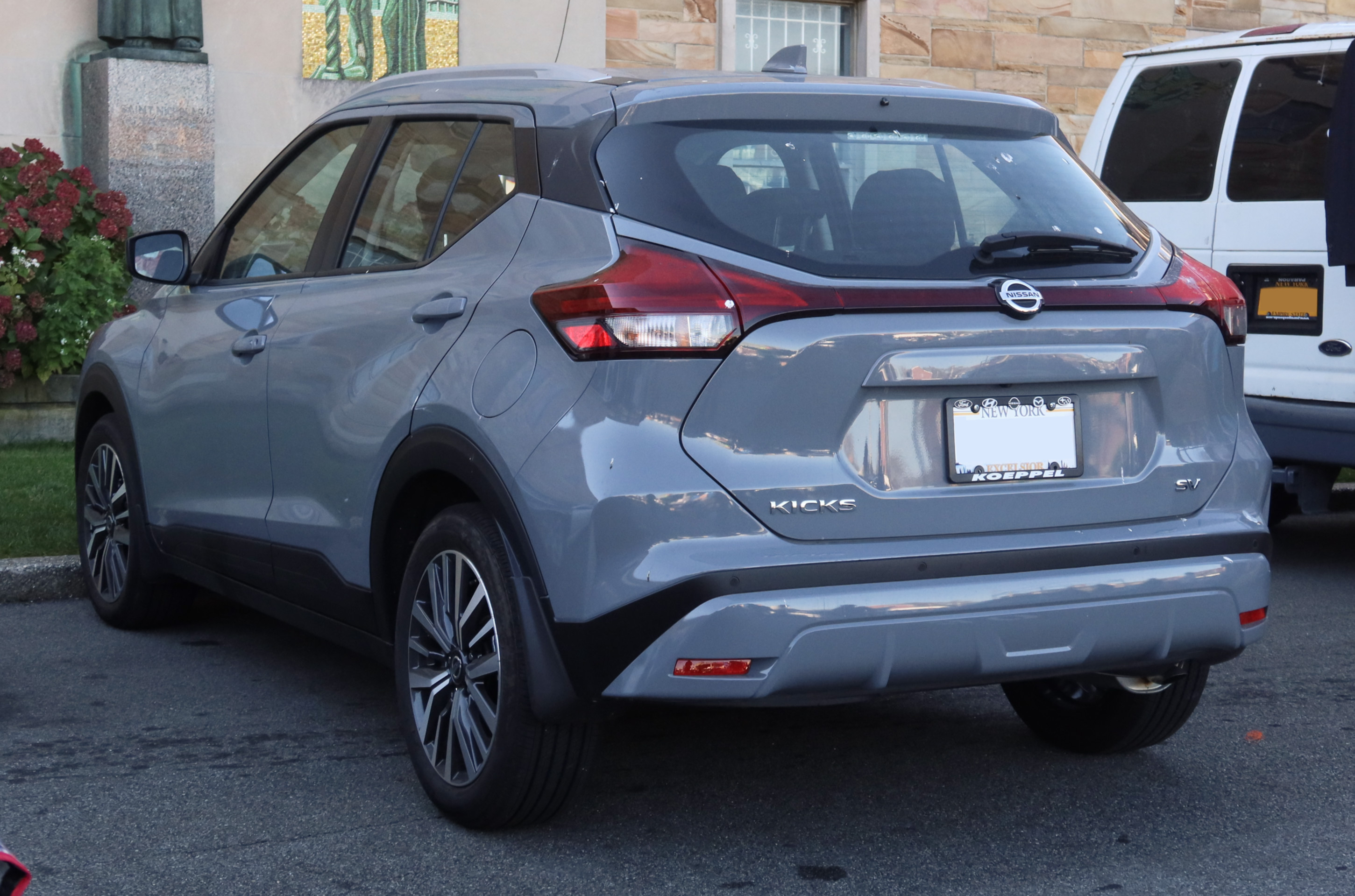
2021 Kicks SV (P15; US, facelift)

==== 2026 facelift ====
The second facelift Kicks was first launched under the Kait nameplate in Brazil in December 2025.

In March 2026, the facelifted Kicks e-Power was released in Thailand. The changes of the facelifted model includes a redesigned front fascia with new headlights and a new grille, a redesigned rear fascia with new taillights and the number plate housing was moved down on the bumper, new exterior colours, and new alloy wheel designs. Inside, the interior dashboard, door panels and centre console were redesigned, new Zero Gravity design for the front and rear seats, a new full digital MID display (replaced the former partially digital instrument cluster), new touchscreen infotainment systems equipped with NissanConnect services and wireless connectivity for Android Auto and Apple CarPlay. For safety, the facelift model receives Nissan ProPilot Assist semi-autonomous driving assistance system and the inclusion of new advanced driving assistance system features.

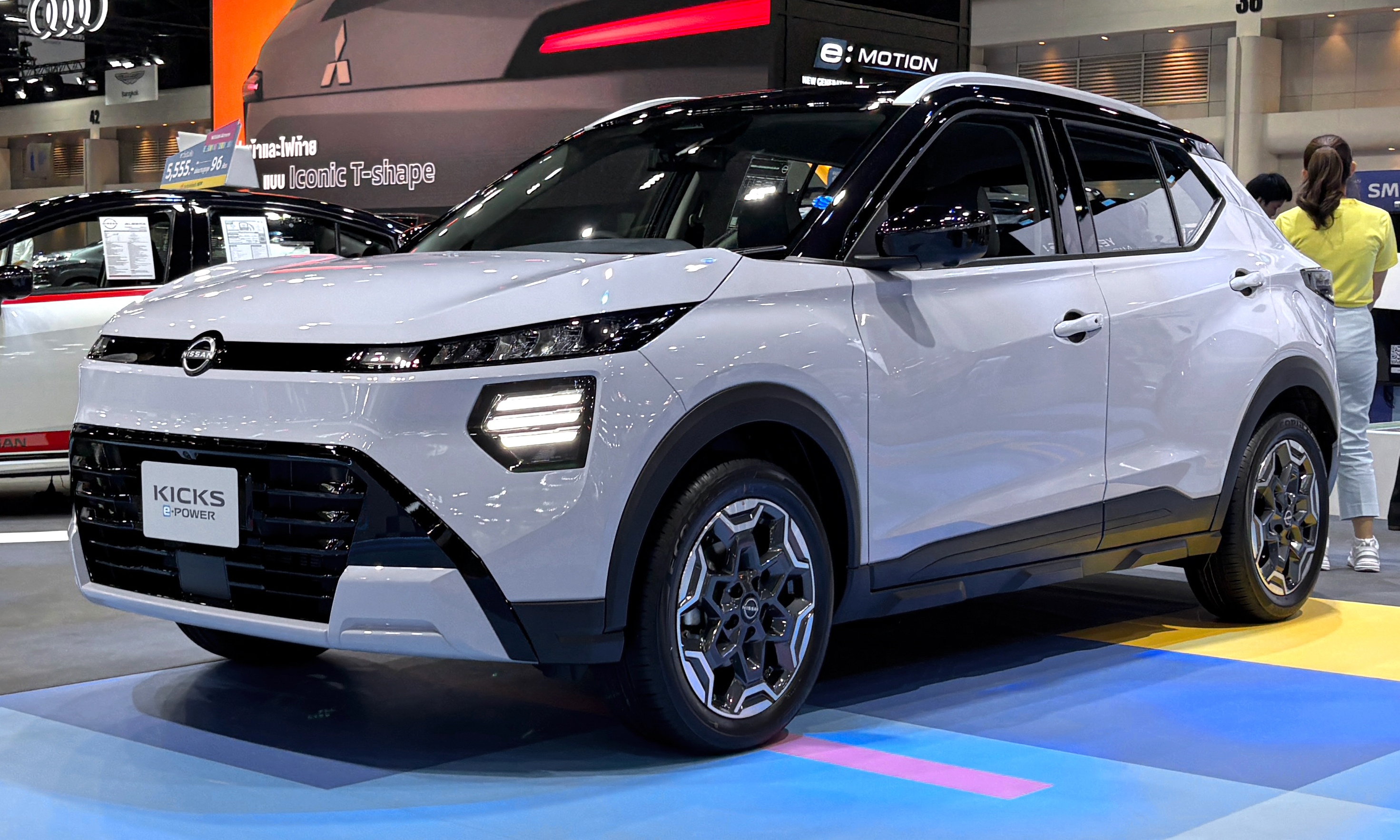
2026 Kicks e-Power SV (Thailand)

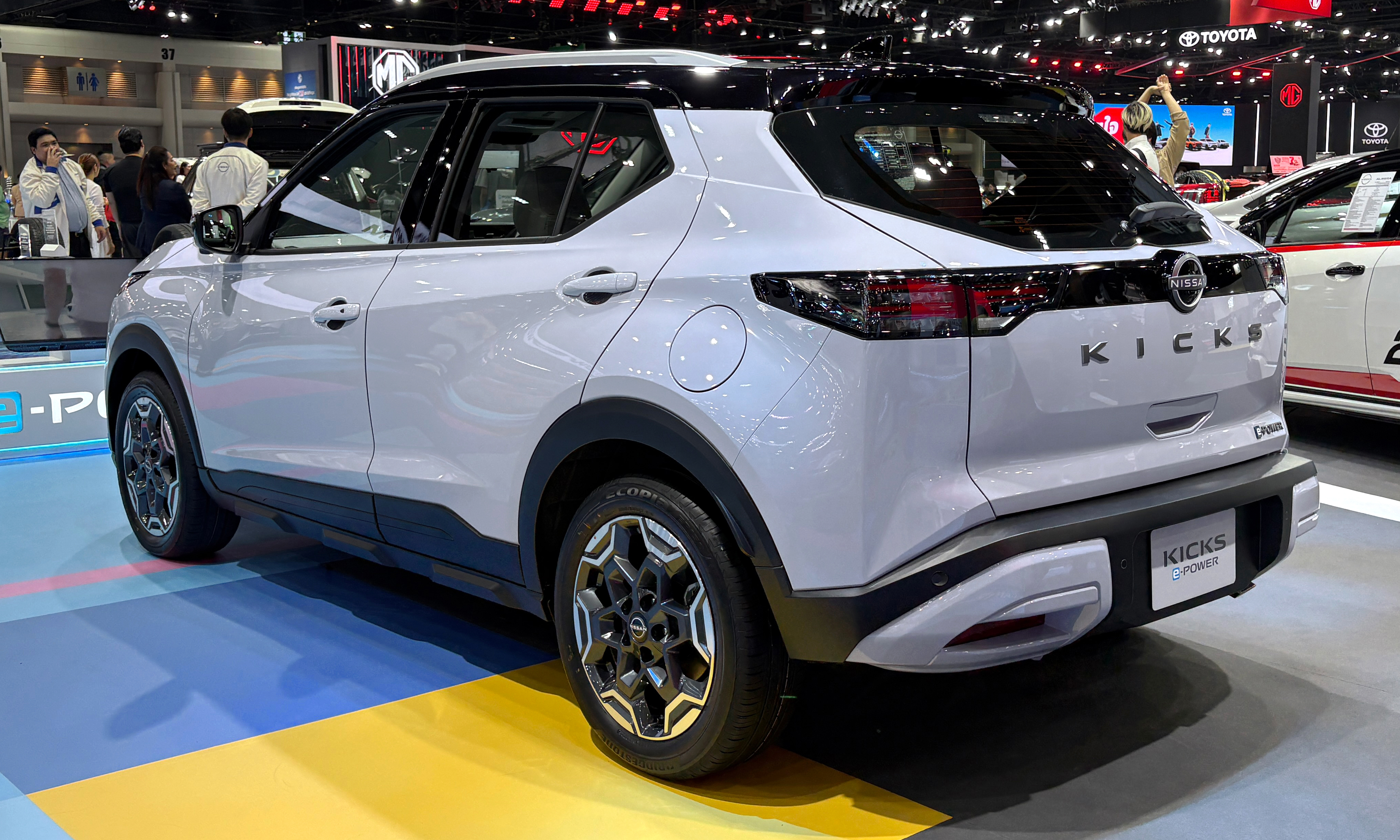
Rear view

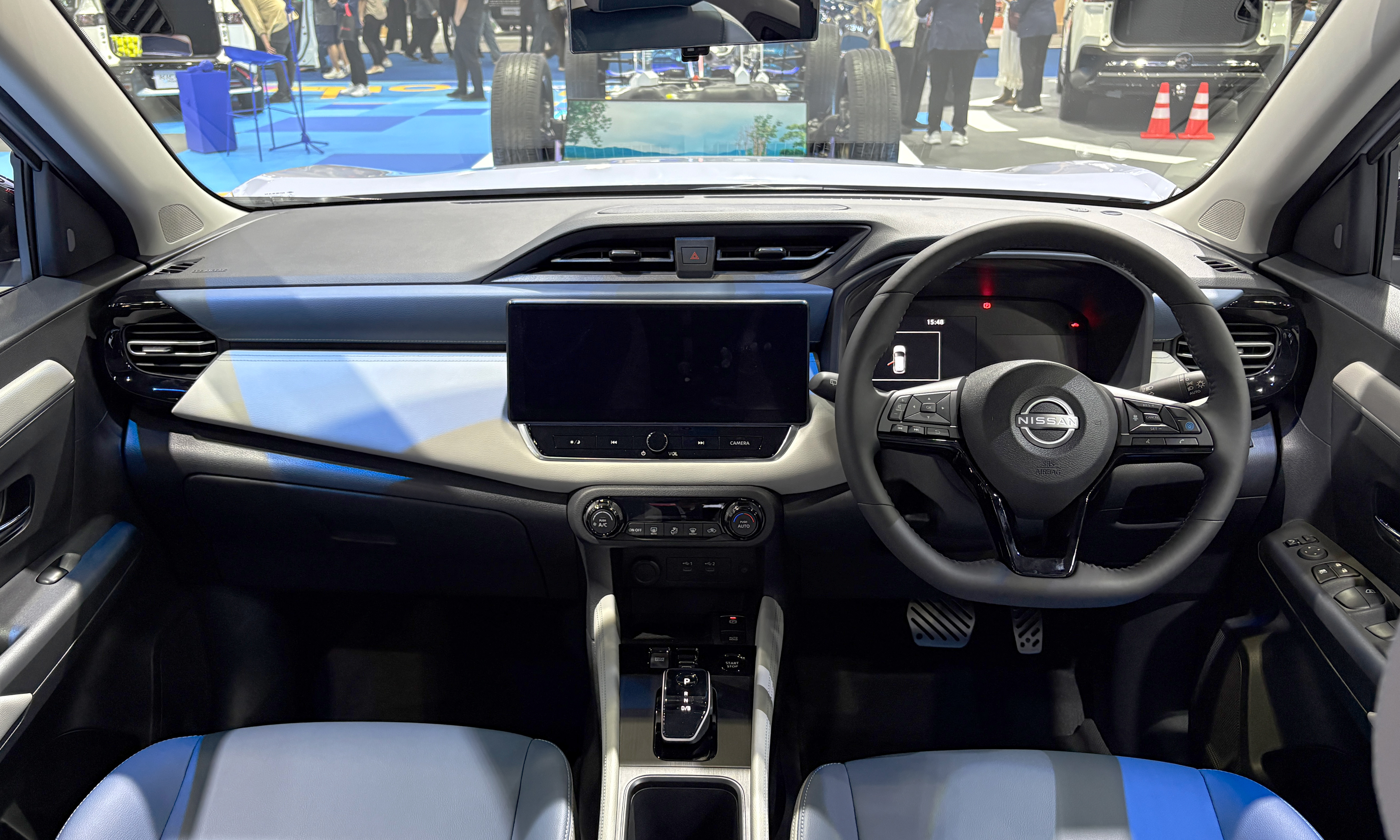
Interior

==== Engines ====
The Kicks is equipped with Nissan's HR16DE 1.6 L four-cylinder petrol engine shared with the Versa. This engine generates 125 hp (127 PS; 93 kW) and 155 N⋅m (114 lb⋅ft; 16 kg⋅m) of torque. Nissan rates this engine to receive an EPA fuel economy rating of 31 miles per US gallon (13.2 km/L; 7.6 L/100 km) city and 36 miles per US gallon (15.3 km/L; 6.5 L/100 km) highway. The Chinese and Taiwanese version uses Nissan's HR15DE 1.5 L four-cylinder petrol engine.

The e-Power version uses the HR12DE 1.2 L three-cylinder petrol engine rated at 78 hp (79 PS; 58 kW) at 5,400 rpm and 103 N⋅m (76 lb⋅ft; 11 kg⋅m) of torque at 4,400 rpm as a generator for the 1.57 kWh battery located under the front seats. The car itself is powered by an EM57 electric motor with 127 hp (129 PS; 95 kW) and 260 N⋅m (192 lb⋅ft; 27 kg⋅m) of torque.

==== Markets ====
===== Americas =====
====== Argentina ======
The Kicks P15 was launched in Argentina on 9 June 2017 at the 2017 Buenos Aires Motor Show. It was available with three variants: Advance M/T, Advance CVT and Premium CVT, powered by the 1.6-litre petrol engine.

The facelifted Kicks P15 was launched in Argentina on 21 April 2021, with four trim levels: Sense, Advance, Advance Plus and Exclusive, powered by the 1.6-litre petrol engine paired with either a 5-speed manual and a CVT.

====== Brazil ======
The Kicks P15 went on sale in Brazil on 5 August 2016. Initially imported from Mexico, it was available in the sole SL trim powered by the 1.6-litre flex-fuel petrol engine paired only with a CVT. In November 2016, the SV Limited trim was introduced to the line-up to sit below the SL trim. In June 2017, the entry-level PCD and S trims were introduced to the line-up.

The facelifted Kicks P15 was launched in Brazil on 25 February 2021, with three trim levels: Sense, Advance and Exclusive (available with the Tech Pack), powered by the 1.6-litre flex-fuel petrol engine paired with either a 5-speed manual and a CVT.

====== Mexico ======
The Kicks P15 was launched in Mexico on 10 September 2016 for the 2017 model year, with three trim levels: Sense, Advance and Exclusive, powered by the 1.6-litre petrol engine paired with either a 5-speed manual and a CVT.

The facelifted Kicks P15 was launched in Mexico on 28 January 2021, with three trim levels: Advance, Exclusive and Platinum.

In September 2021, Nissan announced the launch of the Kicks e-Power for the Mexican market in the second half of 2022, to coincide with Nissan's 60th anniversary in the Mexican market. The Kicks e-Power was launched in Mexico on 20 October 2022, with three trim levels: Advance, Exclusive and Platinum.

====== North America ======
The Kicks made the North American debut on 29 November 2017 at the 2017 Los Angeles Auto Show, and went on sale in June 2018. Imported from Mexico, it replaced the Juke and also indirectly replaced the Versa Note as a subcompact hatchback offering in the region.

The Kicks P15 was released for the North American market in June 2018 for the 2018 model year. It was available with three trim levels: S, SV and SR, powered by the 1.6-litre petrol engine paired only with a CVT.

The facelifted Kicks P15 was released in North America in February 2021. Trim levels and engine option remain the same from the pre-facelift model, with the introduction of the SR Premium trim for the Canadian market.

===== Asia =====
====== Indonesia ======
The Kicks e-Power was launched in Indonesia on 2 September 2020, in the sole variant.

====== Japan ======
The Kicks e-Power was also revealed in Japan on 24 June 2020 and released on 30 June 2020. It was available in the sole X trim.

====== Malaysia ======
The Kicks e-Power was launched in Malaysia on 4 December 2024, with two trim levels: VL and VLT.

===== Philippines =====
The Kicks e-Power was launched in the Philippines on 12 August 2022, with three trim levels: EL, VE and VL.

The facelifted Kicks e-Power was launched in the Philippines on 28 August 2026, with three trim levels: VE, VL and LE Plus.

====== Singapore ======
The Kicks e-Power was launched in Singapore on 9 July 2020, with two trim levels: Premium and Premium Plus.

====== Taiwan ======
The Kicks P15 was launched in Taiwan on 7 November 2018, with three trim levels: Fashion, Luxury, and Smart Flagship, powered by the 1.5-litre petrol engine paired only with a CVT.

The facelifted Kicks P15 was launched in Taiwan on 6 October 2022, with two trim levels: Excellence Edition and Flagship Edition, powered by the 1.6-litre petrol engine paired only with a CVT.

The Kicks e-Power was launched in Taiwan on 18 October 2023, in the sole variant.

====== Thailand ======
In Thailand, the Kicks e-Power was available with four trim levels: S, E, V and VL.

The facelifted Kicks e-Power was launched in Thailand on 23 March 2026, with three trim levels: V, VL and SV.

====== Vietnam ======
The Kicks e-Power was launched in Vietnam on 2 November 2022, with two trim levels: E and V.

==== Safety ====
On 1 August 2018, Mexican automotive magazine Autología took a Fan Edition version of the Kicks on a moose test. Due to a lack of an electronic stability program (ESP) in this particular trim, the Kicks nearly rolled over while performing the test at 65 km/h. A higher-spec model with ESP was also tested, and it managed to keep all four tires on the ground at the same speed but the driver did not feel the car could manage to return to the road, hence failing the test.

===== Latin NCAP =====
The Kicks in its most basic Latin American market configuration with 2 airbags received 4 stars for adult occupants and 4 stars for toddlers from Latin NCAP 2.0 in 2017.

Latin NCAP 2.0 test results Nissan Kicks + 2 Airbags (2017, based on Euro NCAP 2008)
Test	Points	Stars
Adult occupant:	25.39/34.0	4 /5 stars
Child occupant:	37.41/49.00	4 /5 stars

===== IIHS =====
IIHS scores (2020)
Small overlap front (driver)	Good	
Small overlap front (passenger)	Good	
Moderate overlap front	Good	
Side (original test)	Good	
Roof strength	Good	
Head restraints and seats	Good	
Headlights	Acceptable / Poor	varies by trim/option
Child seat anchors (LATCH) ease of use	Good	

IIHS scores (2021)
Small overlap front (driver)	Good
Small overlap front (passenger)	Good
Moderate overlap front	Good
Side (original test)	Good
Roof strength	Good
Head restraints and seats	Good
Child seat anchors (LATCH) ease of use	Good

===== ASEAN NCAP =====
ASEAN NCAP test results Nissan Kicks (2020)
Test	Points
Overall:	5 /5 stars
Adult occupant:	47.73
Child occupant:	20.77
Safety assist:	18.95

==== TNCAP ====
TNCAP (1.0) test result Nissan Kicks 1.6 'Excellence' (2023, similar to Euro NCAP 2017)
Test	Points	%
Overall:	5/5 stars	
Adult occupant:	31.089	81%
Child occupant:	41.445	84%
Pedestrian:	34.207	81%
Safety assist:	7.146	59%

=== Indian market (D15; 2019) ===
First generation (India)
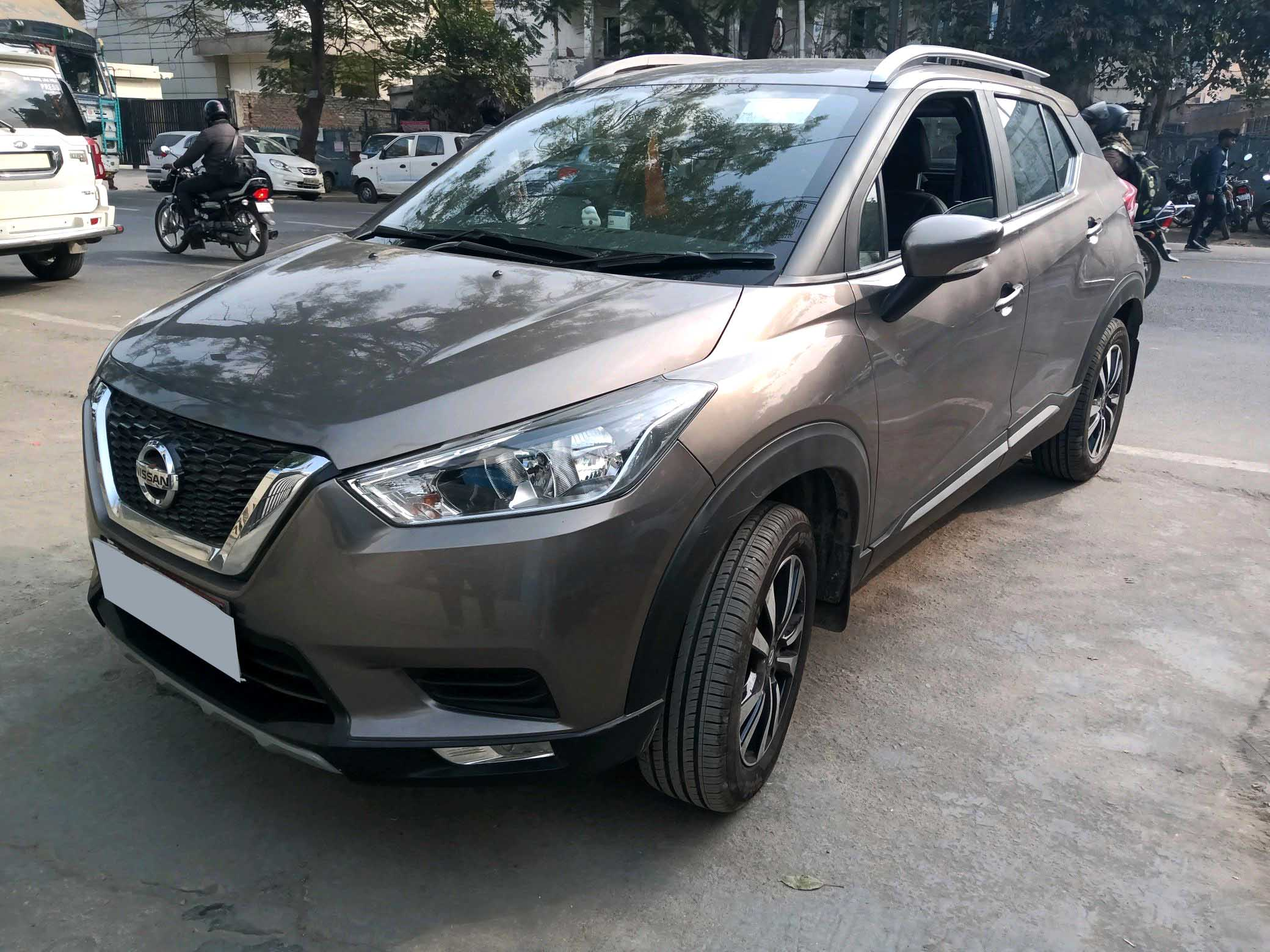
- 2019 Nissan Kicks XV (D15, India)

Overview
- Model code: D15
- Production: 2019–2023
- Assembly: India: Chennai (Renault Nissan India)

Body and chassis
- Layout: Front-engine, front-wheel-drive
- Platform: B0 platform
- Related: Renault Captur (Global Access); Dacia/Renault Duster

Powertrain
- Engine: Petrol: 1.3 L HR13DDT I4-T; 1.5 L H4K I4; Diesel: 1.5 L K9K I4-T
- Power output: 156 hp (158 PS; 116 kW) (HR13DDT); 105 hp (106 PS; 78 kW) (H4K/HR15DE); 109 hp (111 PS; 81 kW) (K9K)
- Transmission: 6-speed manual; CVT

Dimensions
- Wheelbase: 2,673 mm (105.2 in)
- Length: 4,384 mm (172.6 in)
- Width: 1,813 mm (71.4 in)
- Height: 1,656–1,666 mm (65.2–65.6 in)

Chronology
- Predecessor: Nissan Terrano (India)
- Successor: Nissan Tekton

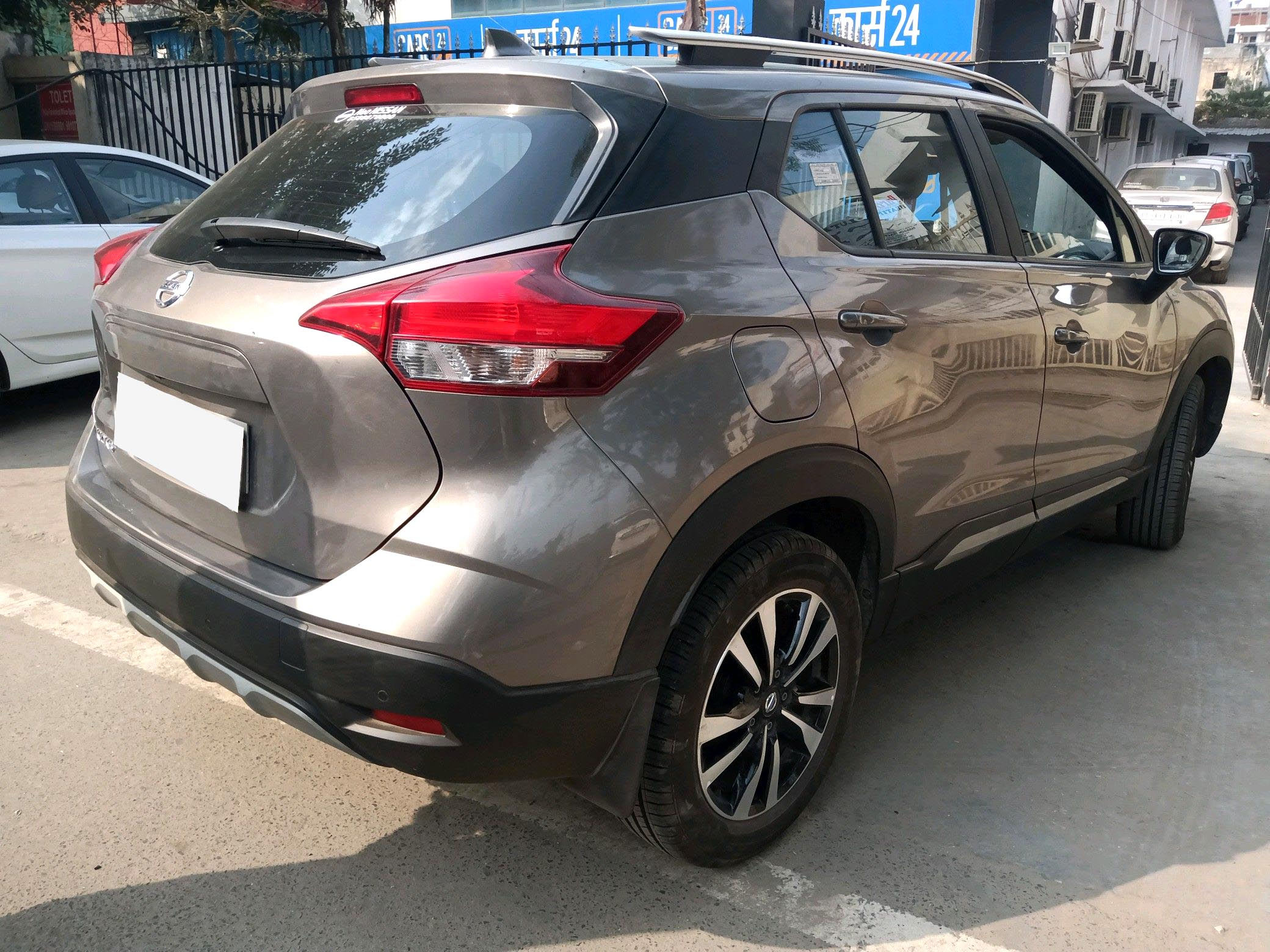
Rear view

For the Indian market, a larger car with a similar styling as the original Kicks was introduced on 22 January 2019. It replaced the Nissan Terrano, a restyled Dacia Duster offered since 2013. The D15 Kicks was also offered in Nepal and Bangladesh.

The Indian market Kicks shares platform and parts with Dacia Duster and the B0 platform-based Renault Captur to reduce costs, as both were manufactured in the same Renault-Nissan plant in Chennai. As the result, the Indian-market Kicks shares very little parts or sheet metal with the global Kicks.

The D15 Kicks initially was offered with the H4K naturally aspirated petrol engine and the K9K diesel engine, both mated to a 6-speed manual transmission. Both engines are shared with the Renault Captur. In May 2020, Nissan removed the K9K diesel engine option due to the implementation of Bharat Stage 6 emission standards. A Renault-Nissan-Daimler HR13DDT petrol turbocharged engine became the replacement. The turbo engine is rated at 156 hp (158 PS; 116 kW) and 254 N⋅m (187 lb⋅ft; 26 kg⋅m), which Nissan claimed was the most powerful in its segment. The engine is also offered with the X-Tronic CVT transmission option for the first time.

The Kicks was made an official car for the 2019 ICC Cricket World Cup.

In 2023, Nissan announced that the Kicks will be ending production in India and discontinued at the market due to poor sales, and the vehicle was not made compliant with Bharat Stage 6 Phase 2 emissions regulations.

== Second generation (P16; 2024) ==
Second generation
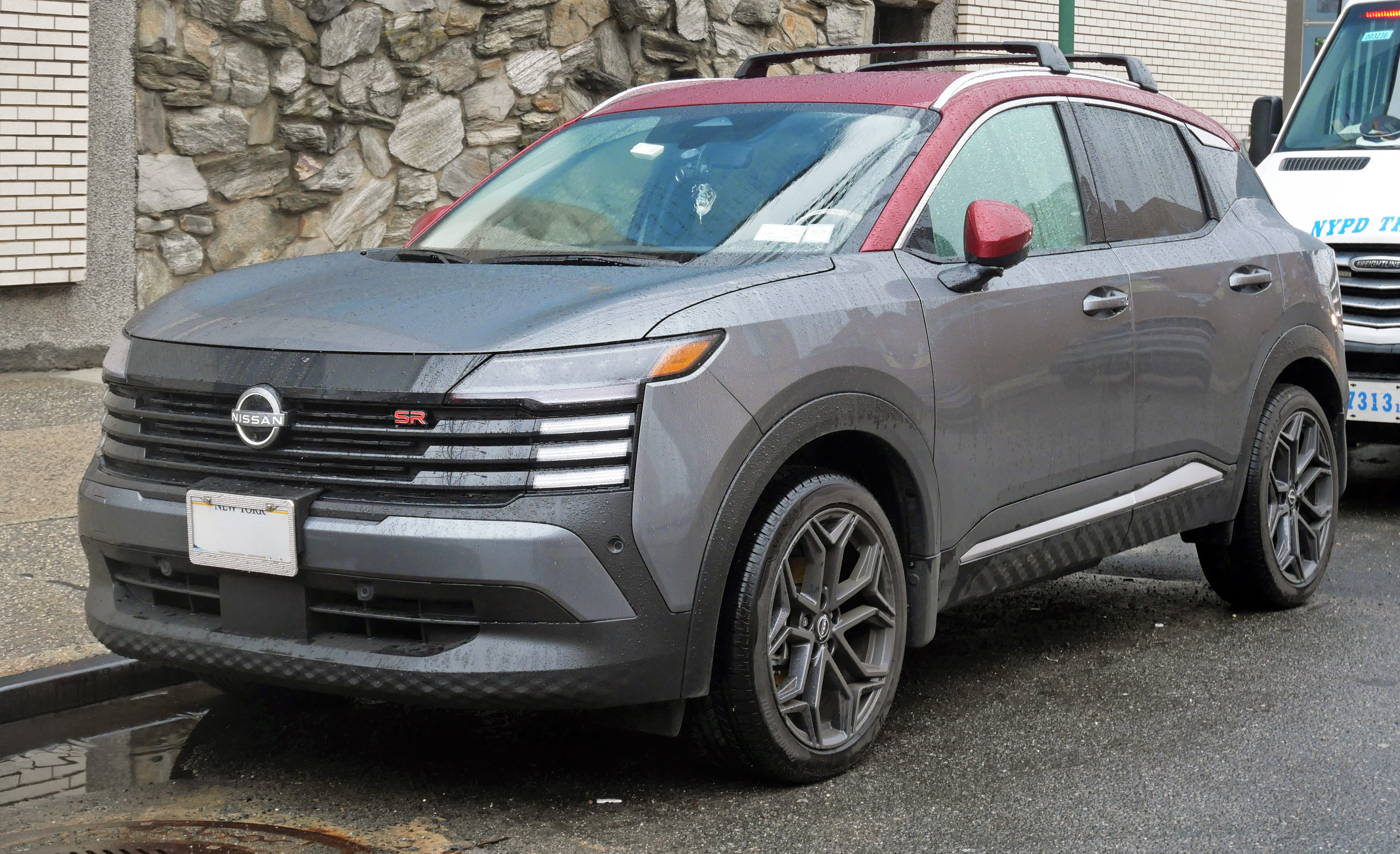
- 2025 Nissan Kicks SR (US)

Overview
- Model code: P16
- Production: 2024–present
- Model years: 2025–present (North America)
- Assembly: Japan: Yokosuka, Kanagawa (Oppama plant); United Kingdom: Sunderland (NMUK); Mexico: Aguascalientes; Brazil: Resende, Rio de Janeiro
- Designer: Satoshi Tanaka (exterior)

Body and chassis
- Layout: Front-engine, front-wheel-drive; Front-engine, all-wheel-drive
- Platform: CMF-B HS
- Related: Nissan Juke (F16); Nissan Note (E13)

Powertrain
- Engine: Petrol: 1.0 L HR10DET I3 turbo flex fuel (South America); 2.0 L MR20DD I4; Petrol hybrid: 1.4 L HR14DDe I3 (e-Power) (generator only)
- Electric motor: YM52 and MM48
- Power output: 88 kW (118 hp; 120 PS) (1.0); 104 kW (139 hp; 141 PS) (2.0); 72 kW (97 hp; 98 PS) (e-Power, engine only); 105–155 kW (141–208 hp; 143–211 PS) (e-Power, electric motors)
- Transmission: CVT; 6-speed DCT (South America); Single speed constant ratio (e-Power)
- Hybrid drivetrain: Series (e-Power)
- Battery: Lithium-ion

Dimensions
- Wheelbase: 2,657 mm (104.6 in) (FWD); 2,664 mm (104.9 in) (AWD)
- Length: 4,365 mm (171.9 in)
- Width: 1,800 mm (70.9 in)
- Height: 1,620–1,631 mm (63.8–64.2 in)
- Curb weight: 1,355–1,475 kg (2,987–3,252 lb)

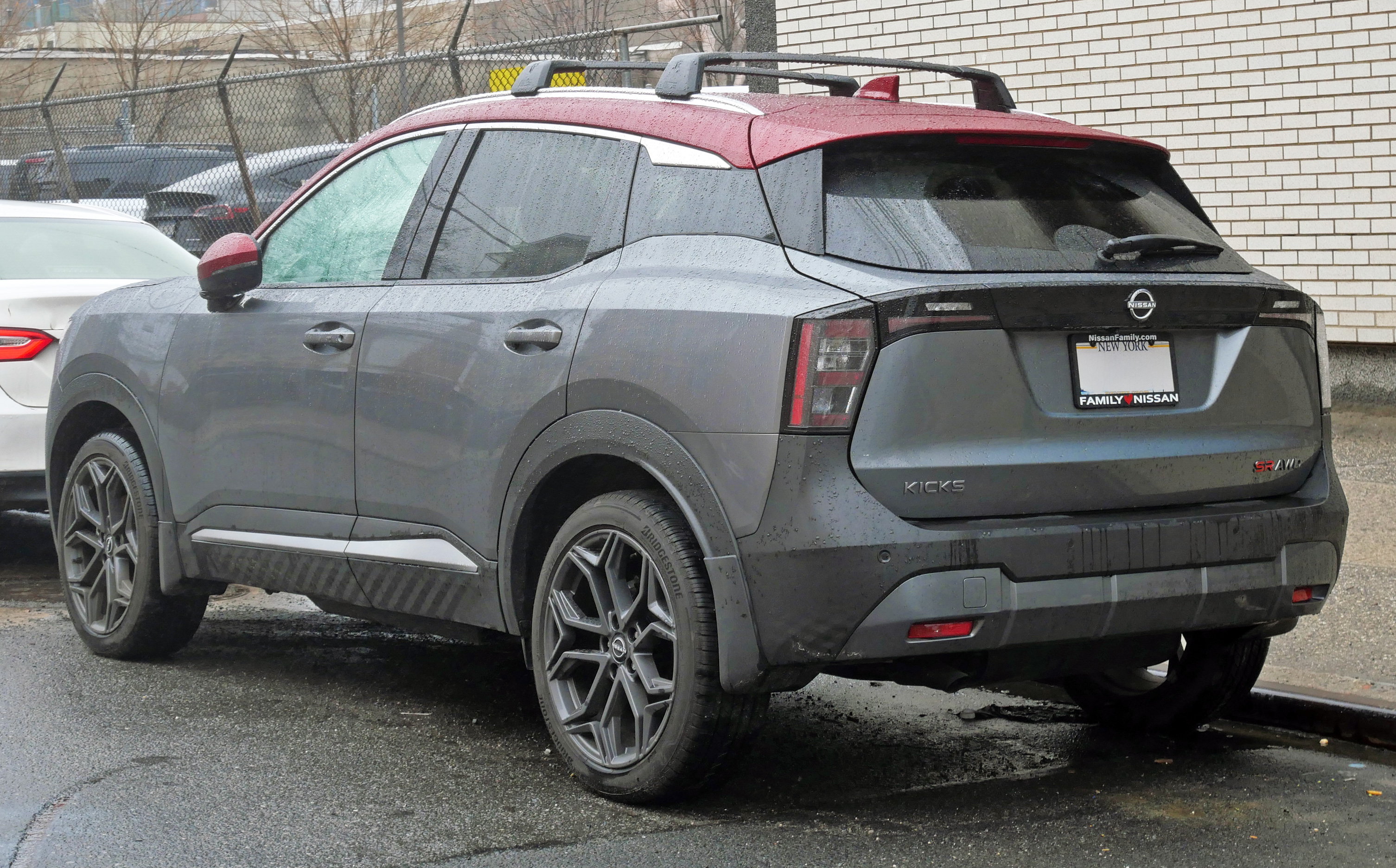
Rear view

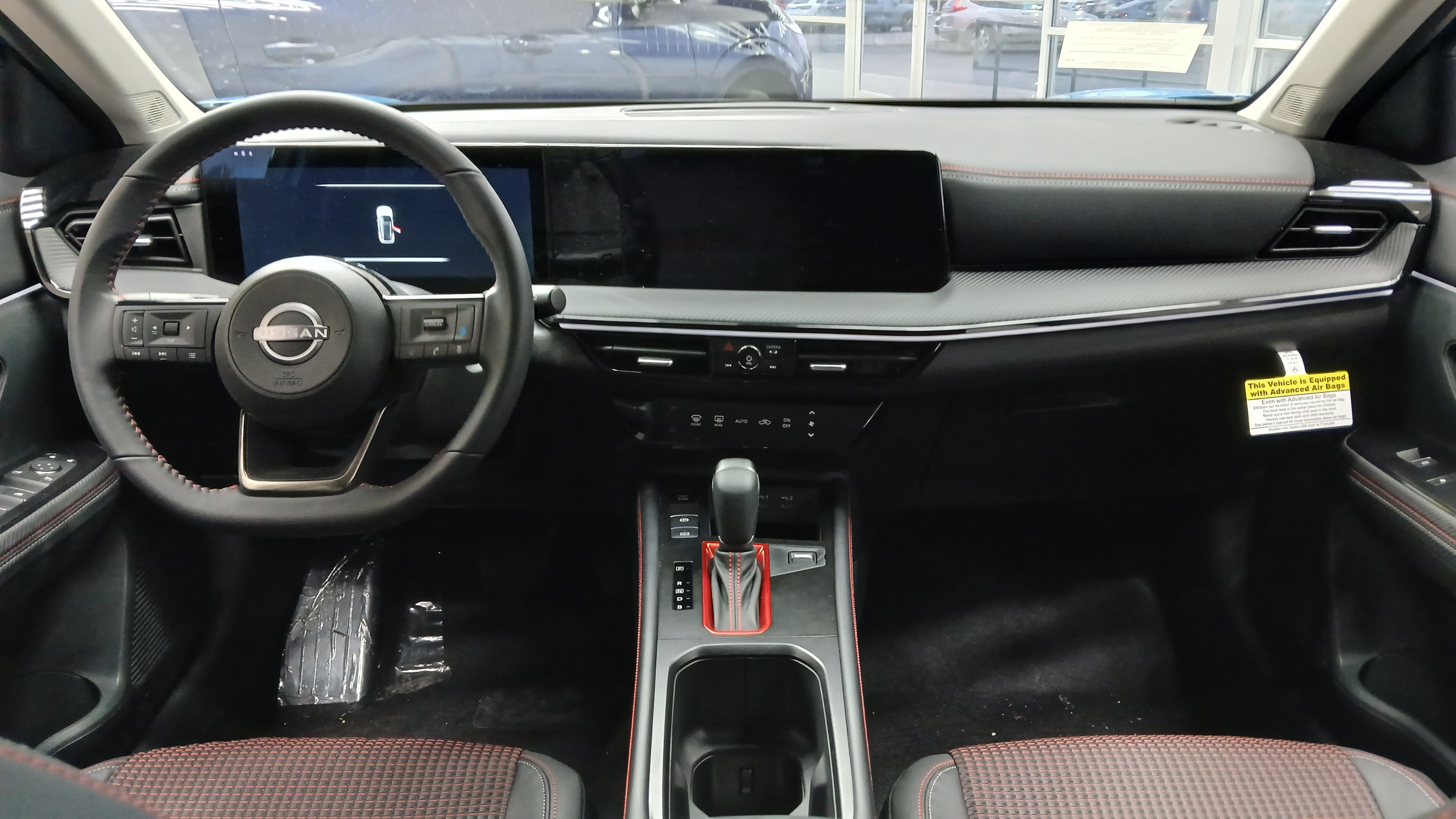
Interior

The second-generation Kicks debuted in the U.S. on 22 March 2024 for the 2025 model year. The model is 71 mm (2.8 in) longer, 41 mm (1.6 in) wider and 20 mm (0.8 in) taller, with around 50 mm (2.0 in) longer wheelbase.

The U.S. market model is powered by a larger 2.0-litre petrol engine, which is 13 kW (17 hp; 18 PS) more powerful than the 1.6-litre petrol engine used by the previous generation Kicks. An Xtronic branded CVT is the only available choice in the US market. For the first time outside of Japan, the Kicks is also available with optional all-wheel drive.

The interior features twin 7-inch screens that serve as the gauge cluster and infotainment system, which offers Bluetooth connectivity, an aux jack and a USB type-A port. They can be optionally upgraded to 12.3-inch screens with upgraded infotainment which offers wireless Android Auto and Apple CarPlay support. An available 10-speaker Bose sound system features speakers integrated into the front passenger seats' headrests. A front wireless charging pad is optional in the centre console, along with up to four USB type-C ports.

Cloth seating is standard with optional heated front seats, while the SR trim receives leatherette seating surfaces. The driver's seat is 6-way manually adjustable, while the passenger seat is 4-way adjustable. Both rows feature an improved seating design Nissan calls Zero Gravity.

Production of the North American market second-generation Kicks will be done in Aguascalientes, Mexico. Nissan was forced to delay the start of production (SOP) date by an additional six months from the initially planned December 2023 to June 2024 due to several issues, such as failure to pass crash safety tests and tooling theft at a supplier factory in Mexico.

=== Markets ===
==== Argentina ====
The second-generation Kicks was launched in Argentina on 10 December 2025. Imported from Brazil, it is available with three trim levels: Sense, Advance and Exclusive, it is powered by the 1.0-litre flex-fuel turbocharged petrol engine.

==== Brazil ====
The second-generation Kicks was launched in Brazil on 18 June 2025, with four trim levels: Sense, Advance, Exclusive and Platinum, it is powered by the 1.0-litre flex-fuel turbocharged petrol engine.

==== Japan ====
The second-generation Kicks was launched in Japan on 17 June 2026. It is only available with the e-Power series hybrid powertrain with optional e-4ORCE all-wheel drive. The trim levels are offered: X, X+, and G. Unlike the previous generation, it is locally assembled at the Oppama plant in Yokosuka, Kanagawa instead of being imported from Thailand or Mexico.

==== Mexico ====
Pricing for the Mexican-spec Kicks were announced on 6 November 2024. For the Mexican market, the trim levels are: Sense, Advance, Exclusive and Platinum.

==== Middle East ====
The second-generation Kicks was launched in the Middle East on 17 February 2025, with four trim levels: S, SV, SV+, and SL.

==== North America ====
Pricing for the North American-spec Kicks were announced in August 2024. For the North American market, the trim levels are: S, SV and SR, with a Premium Package available for the SR trim level.

==== Europe ====
For the first time, the Kicks will be sold in Europe, with production of European models taking place at the NMUK plant in Sunderland, England. It will exclusively be sold as a hybrid.

=== Safety ===
The 2025 model year Kicks was awarded "Top Safety Pick" by IIHS. The second-generation Kicks is equipped with Nissan Safety Shield 360 system as standard across all trims, includes Automatic Emergency Braking with Pedestrian Detection, Blind Spot Warning, High Beam Assist, Lane Departure Warning, Rear Automatic Braking and Rear Cross Traffic Alert.

IIHS scores (2025 model year)
Small overlap front	Good
Moderate overlap front (original test)	Good
Moderate overlap front (updated test)	Poor
Side (updated test)	Good
Headlights	Good
Front crash prevention: vehicle-to-pedestrian	Good
Seatbelt reminders	Marginal
Child seat anchors (LATCH) ease of use	Good+

Latin NCAP 3.5 test results Nissan New Kicks + 6 Airbags (2025, similar to Euro NCAP 2017)
Test	Points	%
Overall:	5 /5 stars	
Adult occupant:	36.13	90%
Child occupant:	45.00	92%
Pedestrian:	36.29	76%
Safety assist:	36.63	85%

== Sales ==
Calendar year	Japan	Brazil	Argentina	Colombia	Mexico	China	Taiwan	U.S.	Canada	Thailand	Indonesia	Malaysia (Note: Figures based on registration (Malaysia))	UAE	India (D15)
2016		10,712			5,264									
2017		33,464	1,582	2,568	22,438	44,142							2,411	
2018		46,812	6,533	4,021	21,801	35,864	6,554	23,312	4,362				3,824	
2019		56,062	4,575	3,510	17,837	47,785	16,882	58,193	16,086				3,491	4,776
2020	18,326	36,444	4,938	2,091	10,792	26,373	15,739	58,858	14,150	1,351	153		2,095	1,817
2021	35,044	36,527	5,525	3,864	13,988	18,813	12,762	82,960	18,750	1,368	592			1,860
2022	18,697	38,942	4,502	1,658	16,265	10,501	12,676	54,879	13,115	4,909	467			1,438
2023	15,778	50,781	4,700	1,829	19,322	8,994	9,085	66,820	13,621	5,487	141			
2024	14,346	60,444	3,624	2,969	23,679	9,313	5,661	77,356	24,084	2,855	75			
2025		58,401		5,519	26,276	3,556		103,575	40,956		26	1,214		

Note: For countries where they are reported separately, sales figures here include both the Kicks and Kicks Play.
