= Nissan Kait =

Subcompact crossover SUV

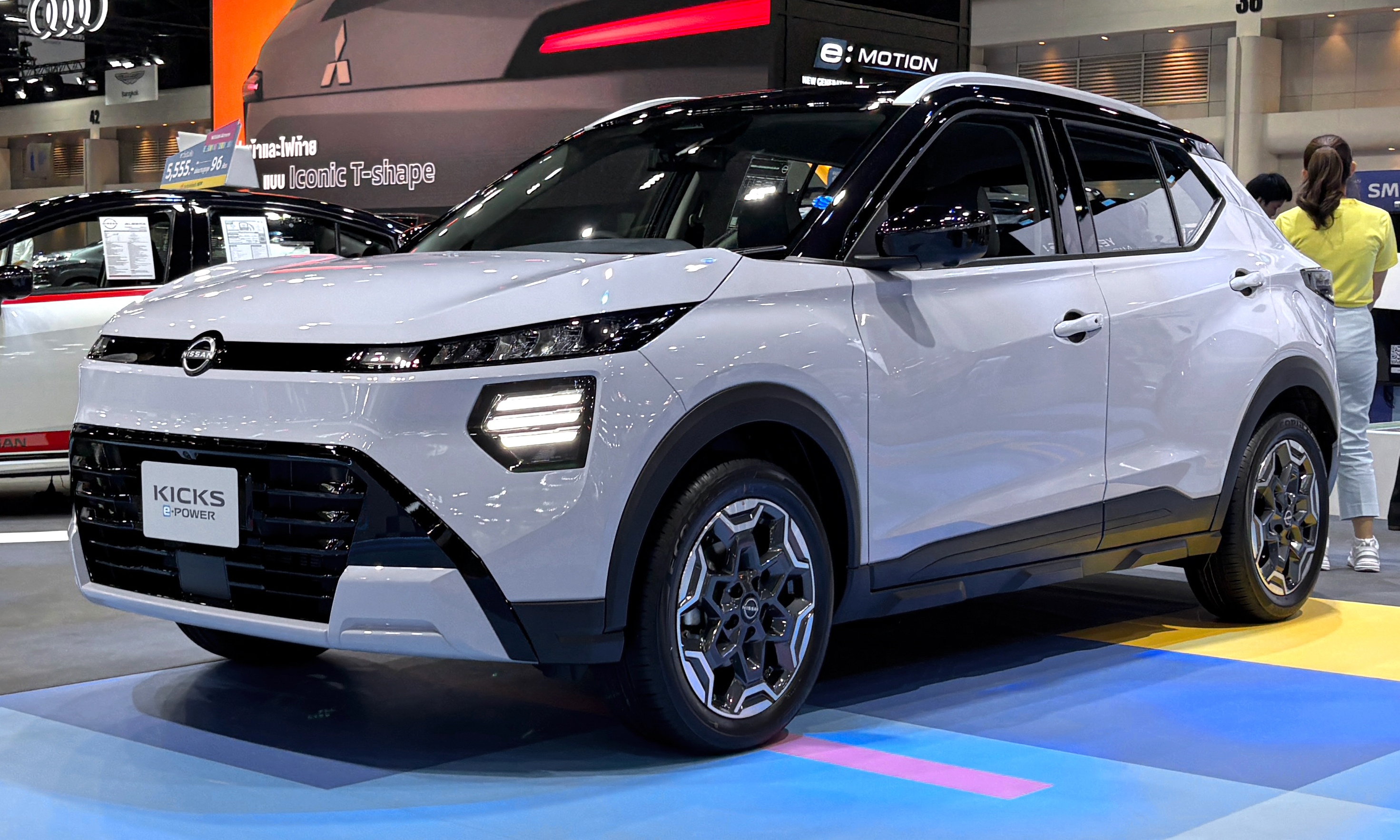
- 2026 Nissan Kicks e-Power SV (Thailand)

Overview
- Manufacturer: Nissan
- Model code: P15
- Also called: Nissan Kicks e-Power (Thailand and Philippines)
- Production: December 2025 – present (Brazil); April 2026 – present (Thailand)
- Assembly: Brazil: Resende, Rio de Janeiro; Thailand: Samut Prakan (NMT, Kicks e-Power)

Body and chassis
- Class: Subcompact crossover SUV
- Body style: 5-door SUV
- Layout: Front-engine, front-wheel-drive
- Platform: Nissan V platform
- Related: Nissan Kicks (P15)

Powertrain
- Engine: Petrol: 1.6 L HR16DE I4; Petrol hybrid: 1.2 L HR12DE e-Power I3 (generator only, Kicks e-Power)
- Transmission: CVT

Dimensions
- Wheelbase: 2,620 mm (103.1 in)
- Length: 4,304 mm (169.4 in)
- Width: 1,760 mm (69.3 in)
- Height: 1,611 mm (63.4 in)

Chronology
- Predecessor: Nissan Kicks Play (Brazil)

The Nissan Kait is a subcompact crossover SUV manufactured by the Japanese carmaker Nissan. It is based on the P15 Kicks, with updated styling but keeps the underpinnings of the Kicks. Production has started in Brazil in December 2025, with exports planned to 20 countries.

== Markets ==
=== Argentina ===
The Kait was launched in Argentina in April 2026, imported from Brazil, It is available in three trims; Sense, Advance, and Exclusive.

=== Brazil ===
The Kait was unveiled in Brazil in December 2025. It is available in six trims; Active, Sense, Sense Plus, Advance, Advance Plus, and Exclusive.

=== Colombia ===
The Kait was launched in Colombia in May 2026, imported from Brazil, It is available in three trims; Sense, Advance, and Exclusive.

=== Costa Rica ===
The Kait was launched in Costa Rica in April 2026, imported from Brazil, It is available in three trims; Sense, Advance, and Exclusive.

=== Mexico ===
The Kait was launched in Mexico in 13th May 2026. It is available in four trims; Advance, Exclusive, and Platinum.

=== Philippines ===
The Kait made its Philippine debut as the Nissan Kicks e-Power at the 2026 Philippine International Motor Show, with sales commencing on 28 August 2026, available in three trims: VE, VL and LE Plus.

=== Thailand ===
In Thailand the model was unveiled as the Nissan Kicks e-Power in March 2026. It is available in three trims; V, VL and SV.

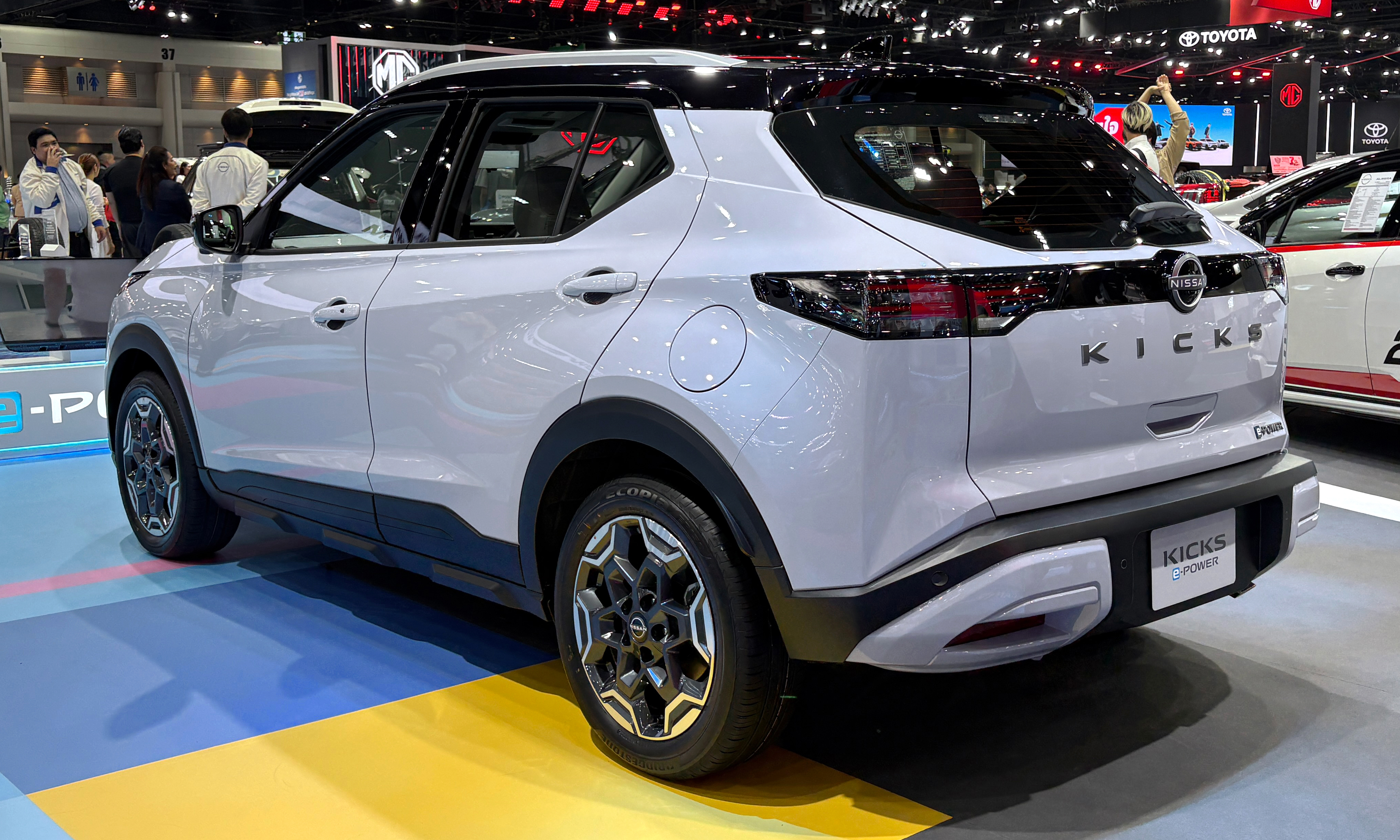
Rear view

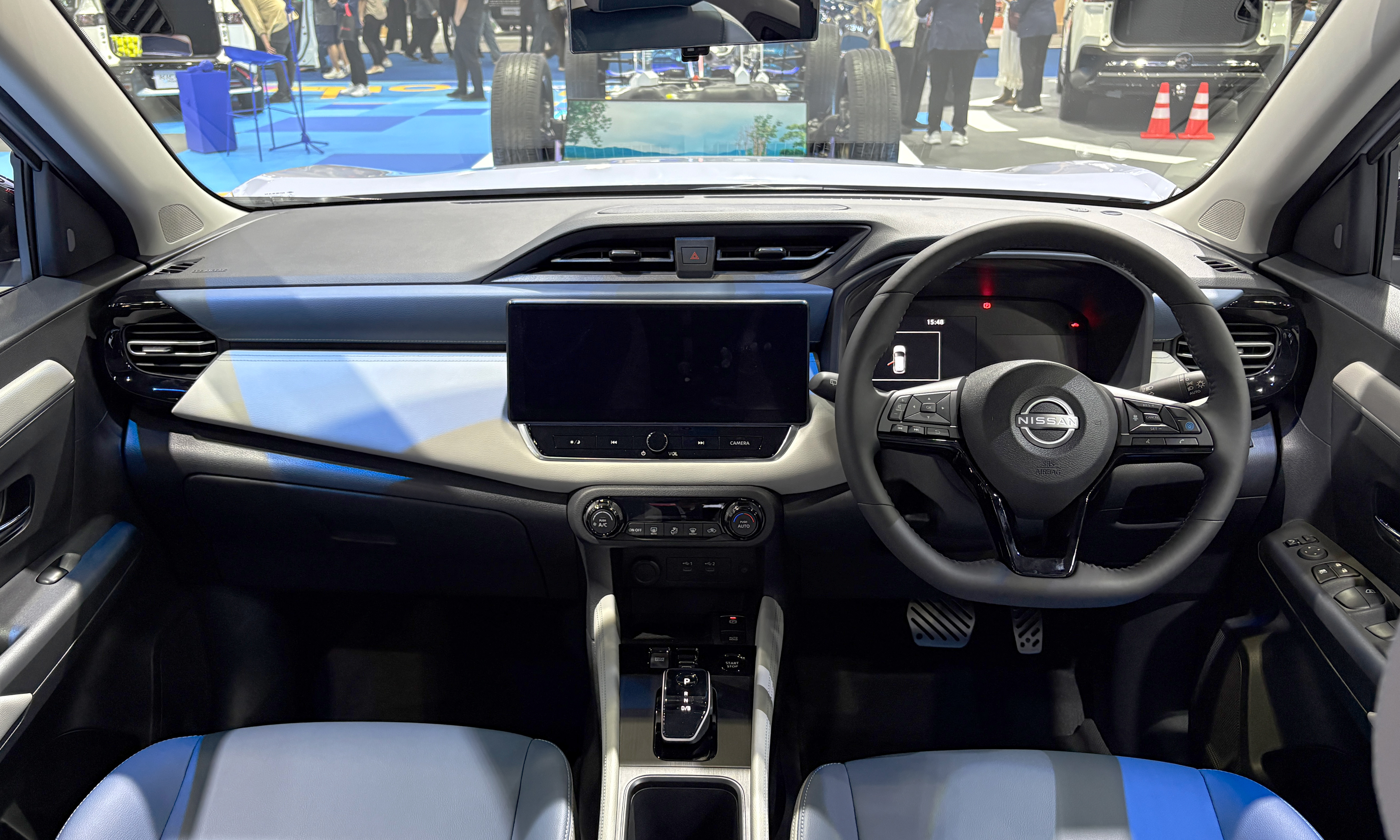
Interior

== Engine ==
Model	Engine	Power	Torque	Fuel economy
HR16DE	"Renault H4M" 1.6L I4 (petrol)	89.484 kW (120 hp; 122 PS) at 6400 rpm	149 N⋅m (110 lb⋅ft; 15 kg⋅m) at 4000 rpm	7.2 L/100 km (13.9 km/L; 39.2 mpg_{‑imp}; 32.7 mpg_{‑US})
