= Nissan Tiida =

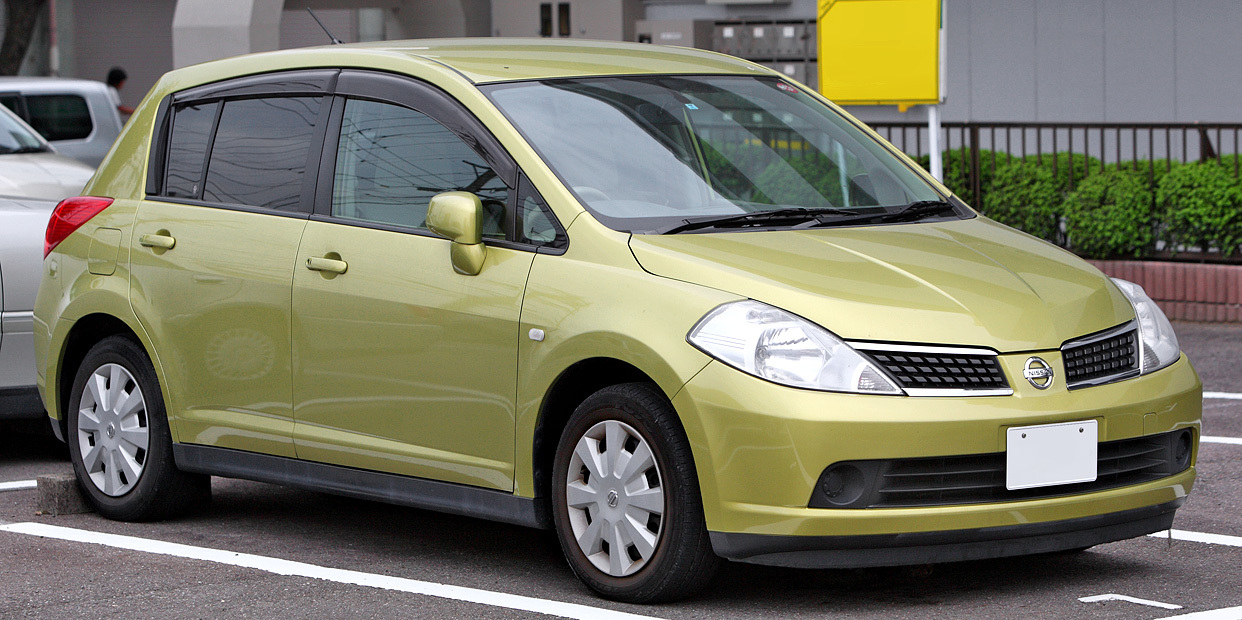
- Nissan Tiida hatchback (C11; Japan)

Overview
- Manufacturer: Nissan
- Production: 2004–2023; 2005–2026 (China)

Body and chassis
- Class: Compact car (C)

Chronology
- Predecessor: Nissan Sunny (B15) (Japan); Nissan Almera/Pulsar/Sentra/Sunny (N16) (Asia/Europe); Nissan Stanza
- Successor: Nissan Note/Versa Note (E12) (C11 hatchback, Asia and Americas); Nissan Almera/Versa/Sunny/Latio (N17) (C11 sedan, Asia and Americas)

The Nissan Tiida (Japanese: 日産・ティーダ, Hepburn: Nissan Tīda) is a compact car produced by the Japanese manufacturer Nissan from 2004 to 2023 through three generations. Depending on the market, the Tiida was also marketed as a subcompact car, particularly in the Americas for the first-generation model as the Nissan Versa. The first-generation model (C11) was produced up to 2018 in some markets, and was offered as a four-door sedan and a five-door hatchback.

The second-generation of Tiida (C12) is marketed since 2011 and only available as a five-door hatchback, while the role of a four-door sedan was passed to the subcompact Almera/Latio/Sunny/Versa (N17) and the compact Sylphy/Sentra/Pulsar (B17). Starting in 2013, the C12 Tiida was released in Thailand, Australia and New Zealand as the Nissan Pulsar. The C12 Tiida represents a departure from the C11, increasing its width to comfortably occupy the compact class, and was no longer marketed in Japan and Taiwan.

The third-generation Tiida sold in Russia and China was introduced in 2015 as a rebadged Pulsar (C13) hatchback.

== Etymology ==
The name "Tiida" is Okinawan for "sun", continuing the naming tradition started in 1966 with the Nissan Sunny.

== First generation (C11; 2004) ==
First generation
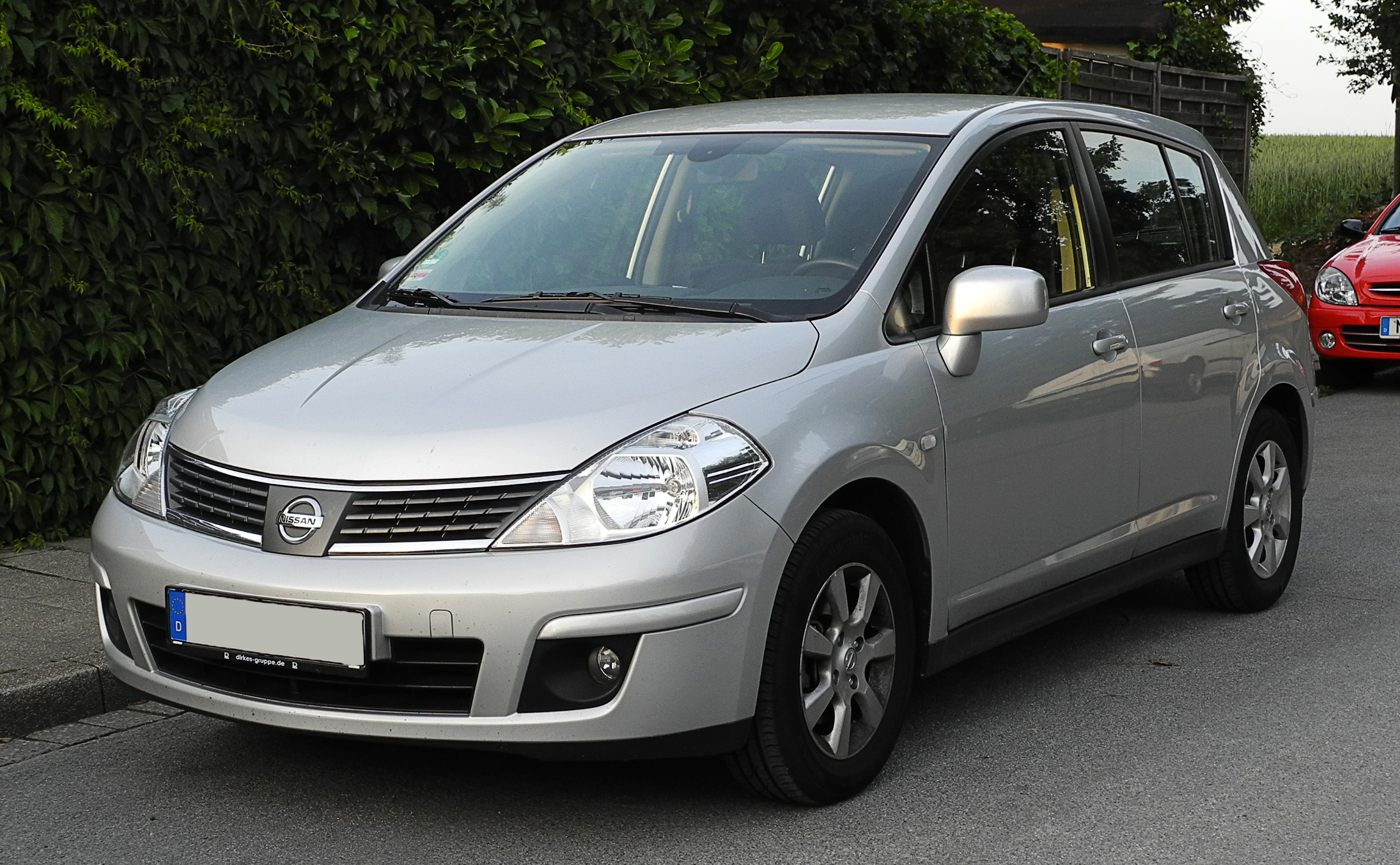
- Pre-facelift Nissan Tiida hatchback (Europe)

Overview
- Model code: C11
- Also called: Nissan Tiida Latio (sedan); Nissan Latio; Nissan Versa (North America); Dodge Trazo (South America, cancelled); Venucia R50/D50 (China, 2012–2016)
- Production: 2004–2012 (Japan); 2005–2011 (China); 2006–2012 (Thailand); 2007–2015 (Malaysia); 2006–2018 (Latin America); 2006–2018 (Taiwan)
- Model years: 2007–2011 (sedan); 2007–2012 (hatchback)
- Assembly: Japan: Kanda, Fukuoka (Kyushu Plant); China: Wuhan; Guangzhou (Dongfeng Nissan); Mexico: Cuernavaca, Morelos; Aguascalientes; Taiwan: Miaoli (Yulon); Thailand: Samut Prakan; Malaysia: Serendah (TCMA); Angola: Luanda

Body and chassis
- Body style: 4-door sedan 5-door hatchback
- Layout: Front-engine, front-wheel-drive or four-wheel-drive
- Platform: Nissan B platform
- Related: Nissan Livina (L10/L11); Nissan Note (E11); Nissan AD/Wingroad (Y12); Nissan Sylphy (G11)

Powertrain
- Engine: Petrol: 1.5 L HR15DE I4; 1.6 L HR16DE I4; 1.8 L MR18DE I4; Diesel: 1.5 L K9K I4
- Transmission: 5/6-speed manual Jatco JF404E 4-speed automatic CVT

Dimensions
- Wheelbase: 2,600 mm (102.4 in)
- Length: 4,295 mm (169.1 in) (hatchback); 4,470 mm (176.0 in) (sedan)
- Width: 1,695 mm (66.7 in)
- Height: 1,535 mm (60.4 in)
- Curb weight: 1,100 kg (2,400 lb)

Chronology
- Successor: Nissan Note/Versa Note (E12) (C11 hatchback, Asia and Americas); Nissan Almera/Versa/Sunny/Latio (N17) (C11 sedan, Asia and Americas)

Nissan revealed the C-Note concept car in 2003 to preview the styling of the C11 Tiida. It is a concept hatchback based on the same platform of the Renault Mégane. The vehicle was unveiled at the 2003 Tokyo Motor Show.

The Tiida hatchback and the Tiida Latio sedan debuted in Japan in 2004, and in some European countries in 2007. It is based on a stretched-wheelbase variant of the Nissan B platform, and was manufactured as a five-door hatchback and a four-door sedan. It was sold in North America as Nissan Versa, and in Southeast Asia as the Nissan Latio. The C11 sat between the subcompact and compact car classes, acting as an intermediate model between the smaller Micra/March and larger Sylphy and Sentra models within the global Nissan portfolio.

Nissan initially directed every markets to adopt the Tiida nameplate for the vehicle, despite objections from several markets such as Australia, which insisted using the more well-known Pulsar nameplate. The US market ended up choosing a new nameplate, the Versa, which established a precedent for Australia to reuse Pulsar nameplate to the succeeding C12 generation.

In Japan, the Tiida replaced the Nissan Sunny (B15) in Nissan's lineup as the smallest sedan. In North America, it became a new entry-level model below the Sentra; and elsewhere the Tiida tended to occupy the role performed previously by the Nissan Almera/Pulsar/Sentra/Sunny (N16), sold in Japan as the Bluebird Sylphy (G10). The G10/N16's successor, the Bluebird Sylphy G11 was not widely sold outside Japan.

Engines include a 1.5-liter, 1.6-Liter or 1.8-liter four-cylinder engine, the larger of which can be coupled to a six-speed manual transmission. There are also two optional dealer packages: the Nismo S-tune Aero Package and Nismo Performance Package.

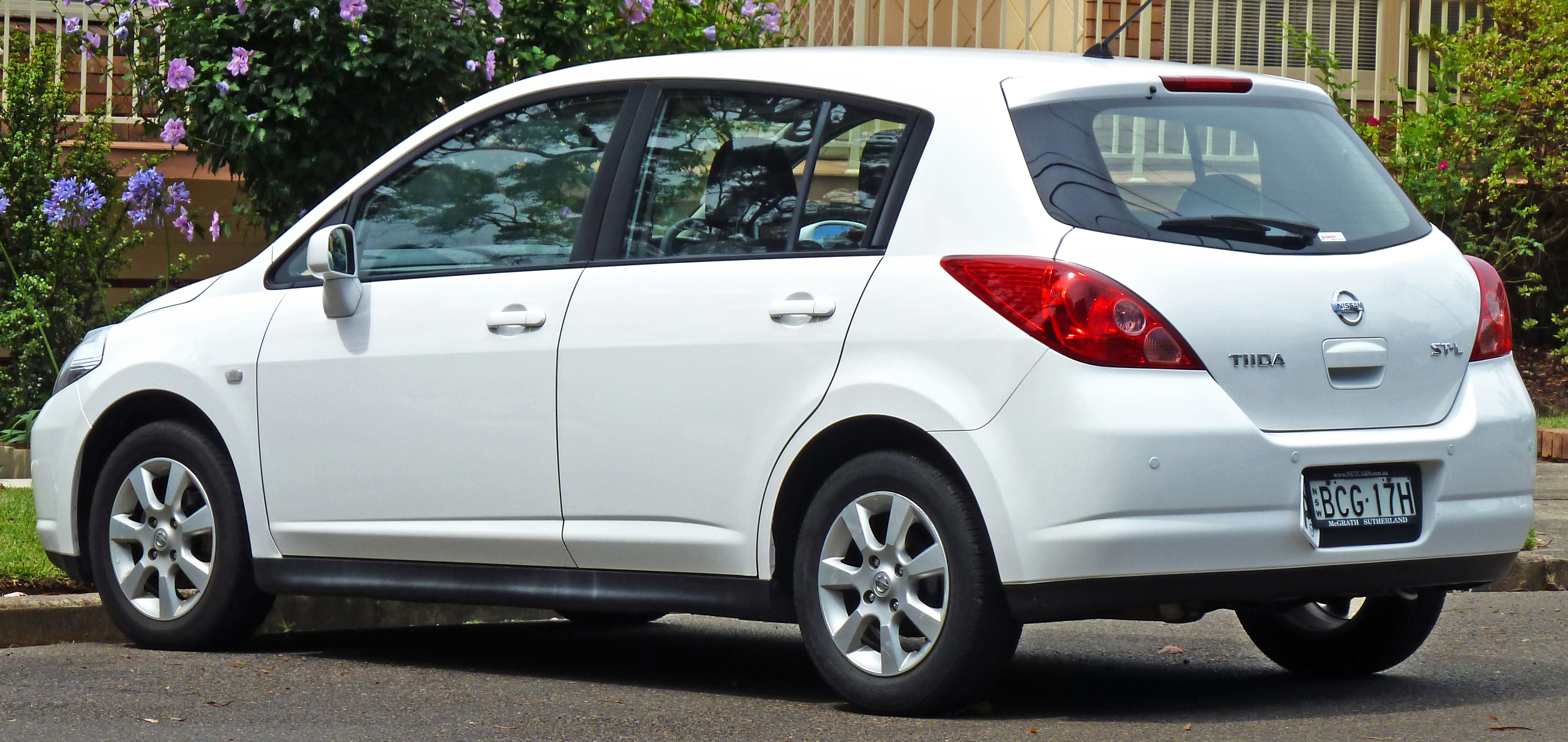
Pre-facelift Nissan Tiida ST-L hatchback (Australia)

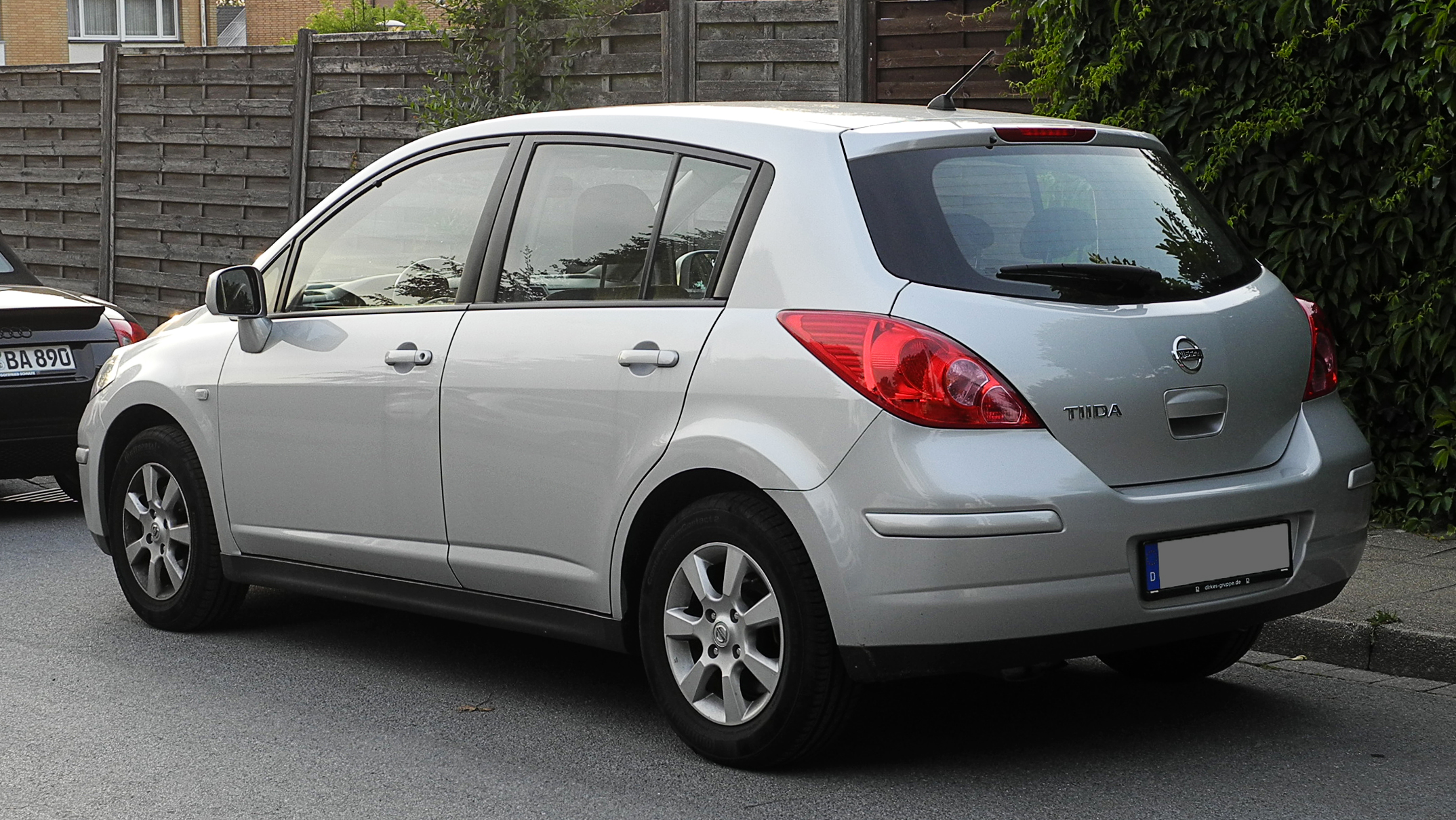
Pre-facelift Nissan Tiida hatchback (Europe)

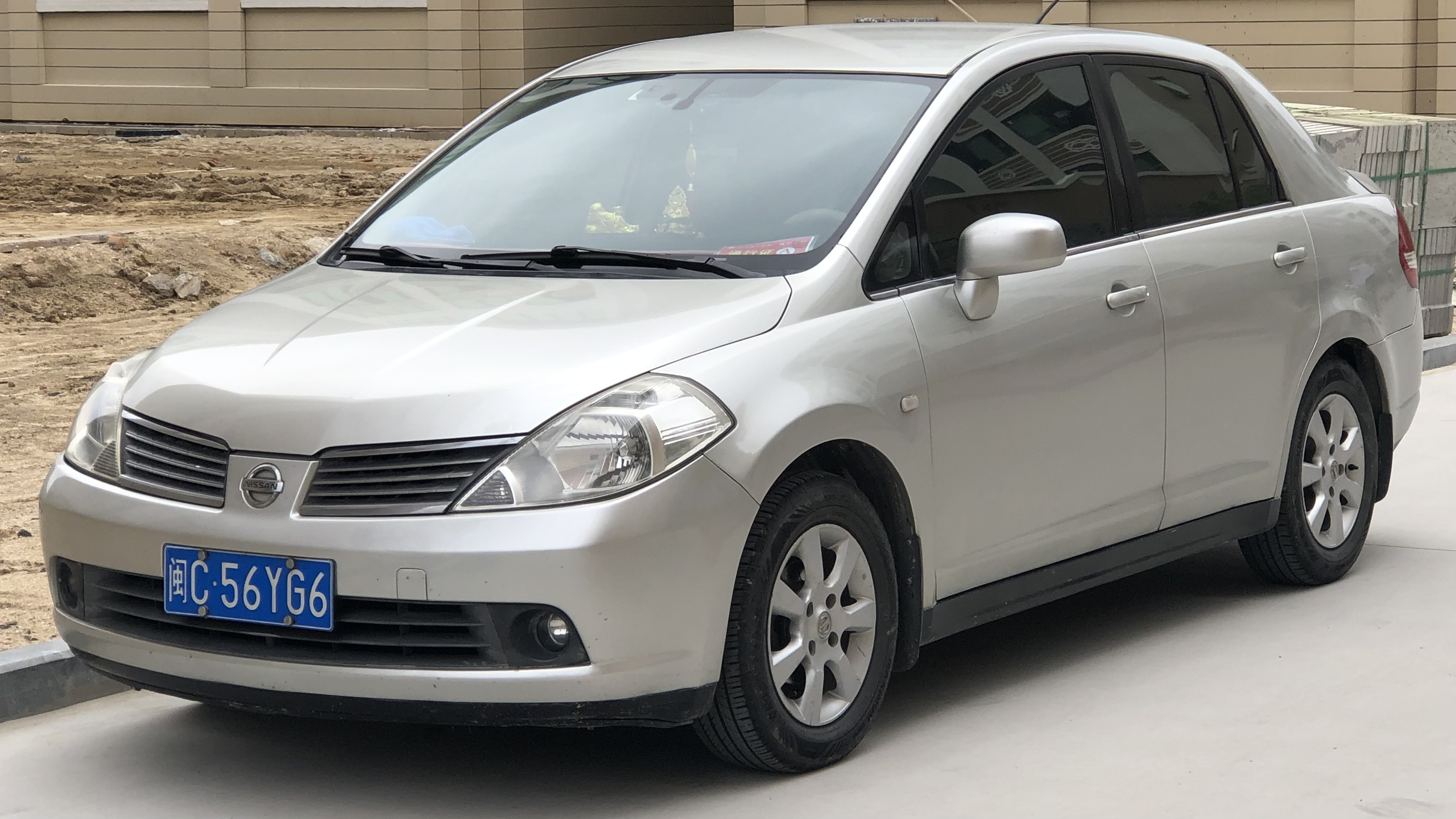
Pre-facelift Nissan Tiida sedan (China)

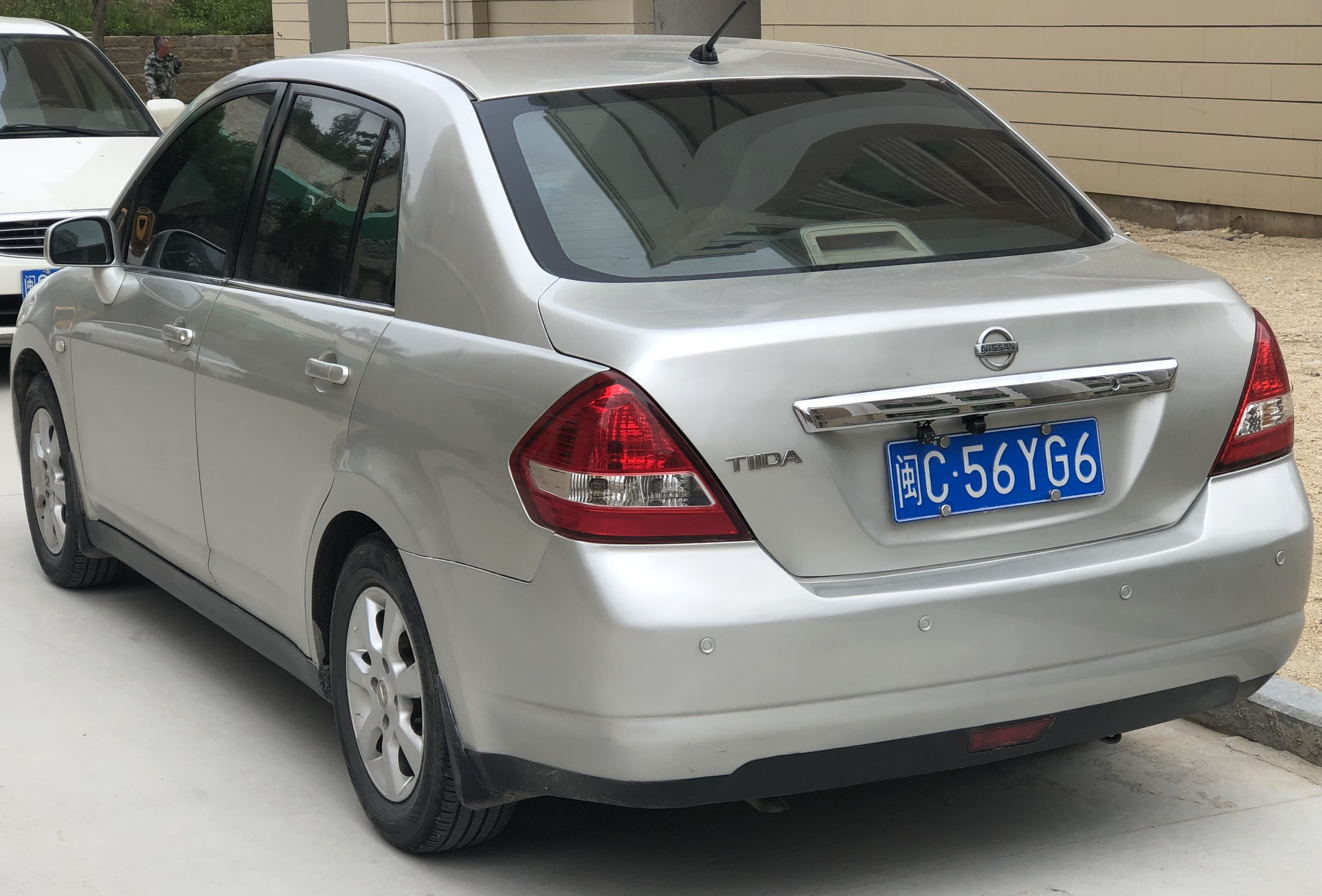
Pre-facelift Nissan Tiida sedan (China)

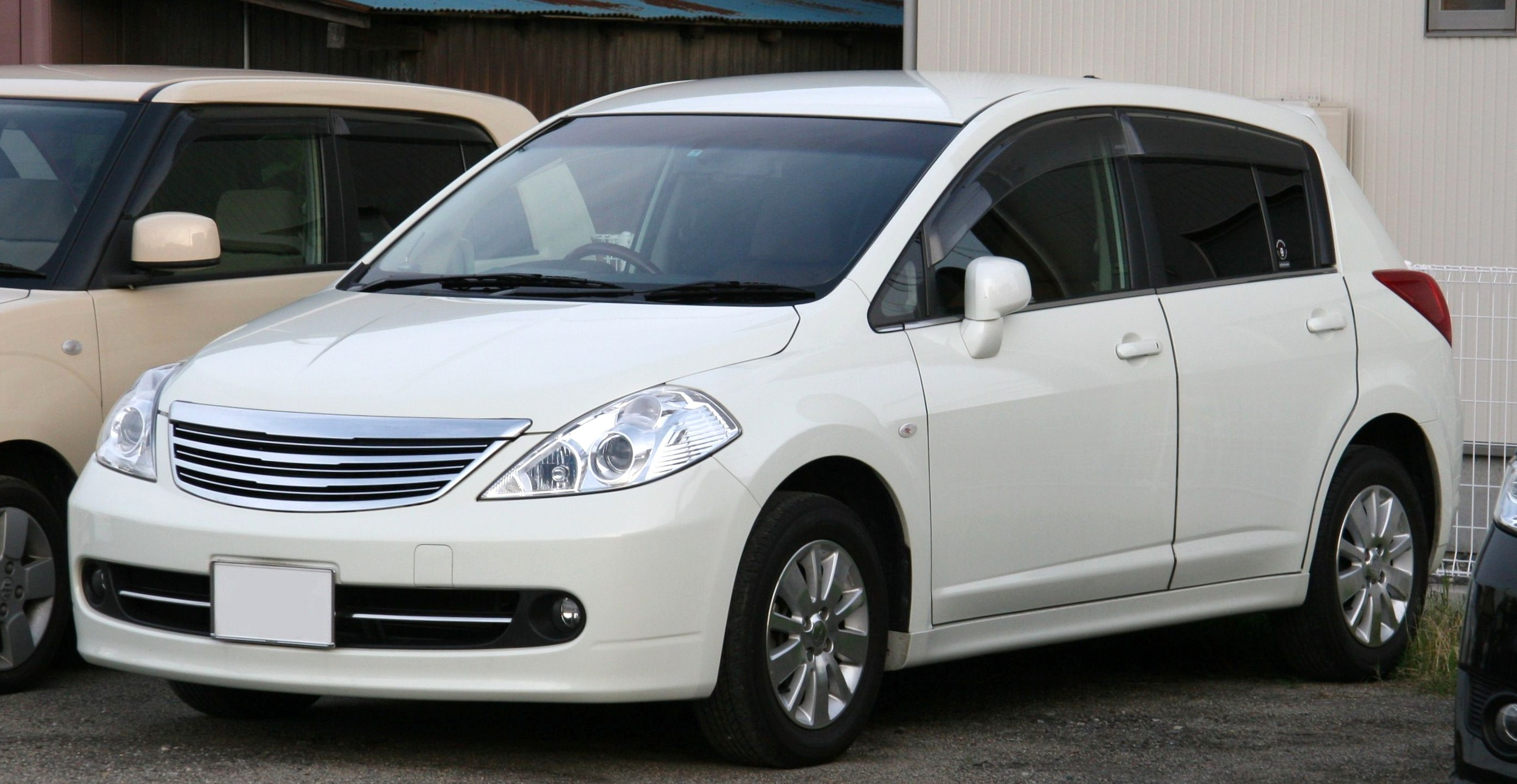
Nissan Tiida Axis hatchback

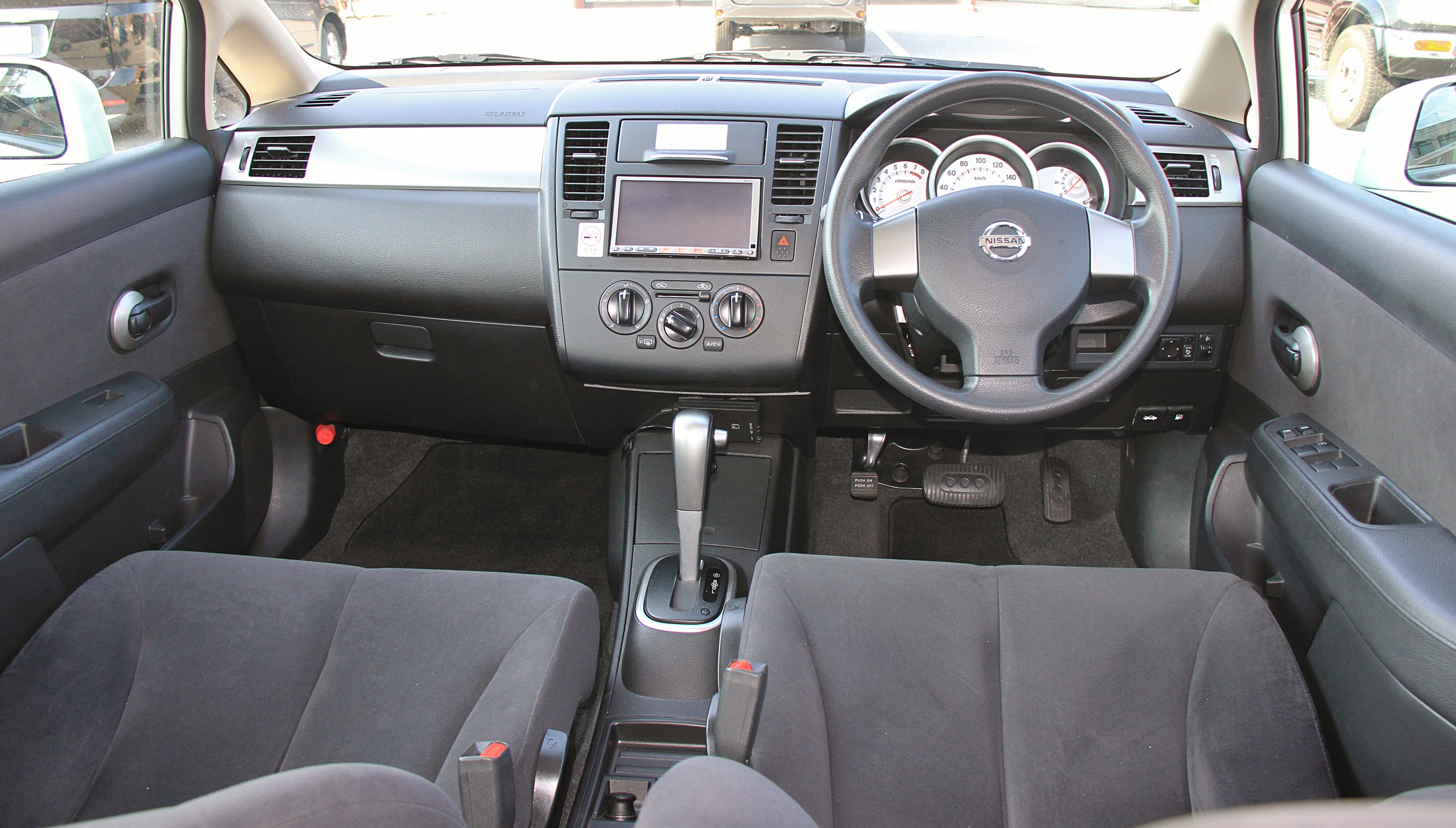
Interior

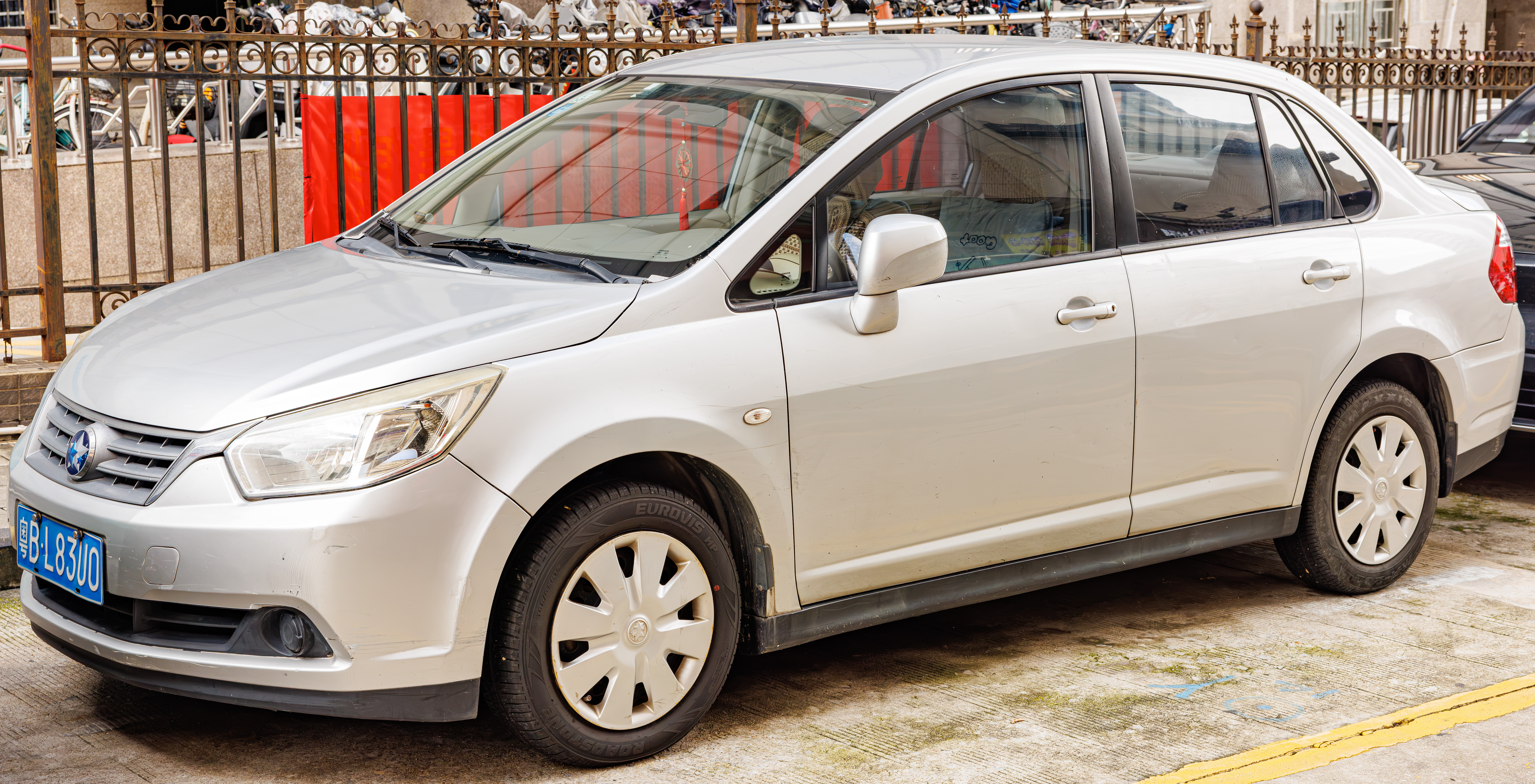
Venucia D50 (front; China)

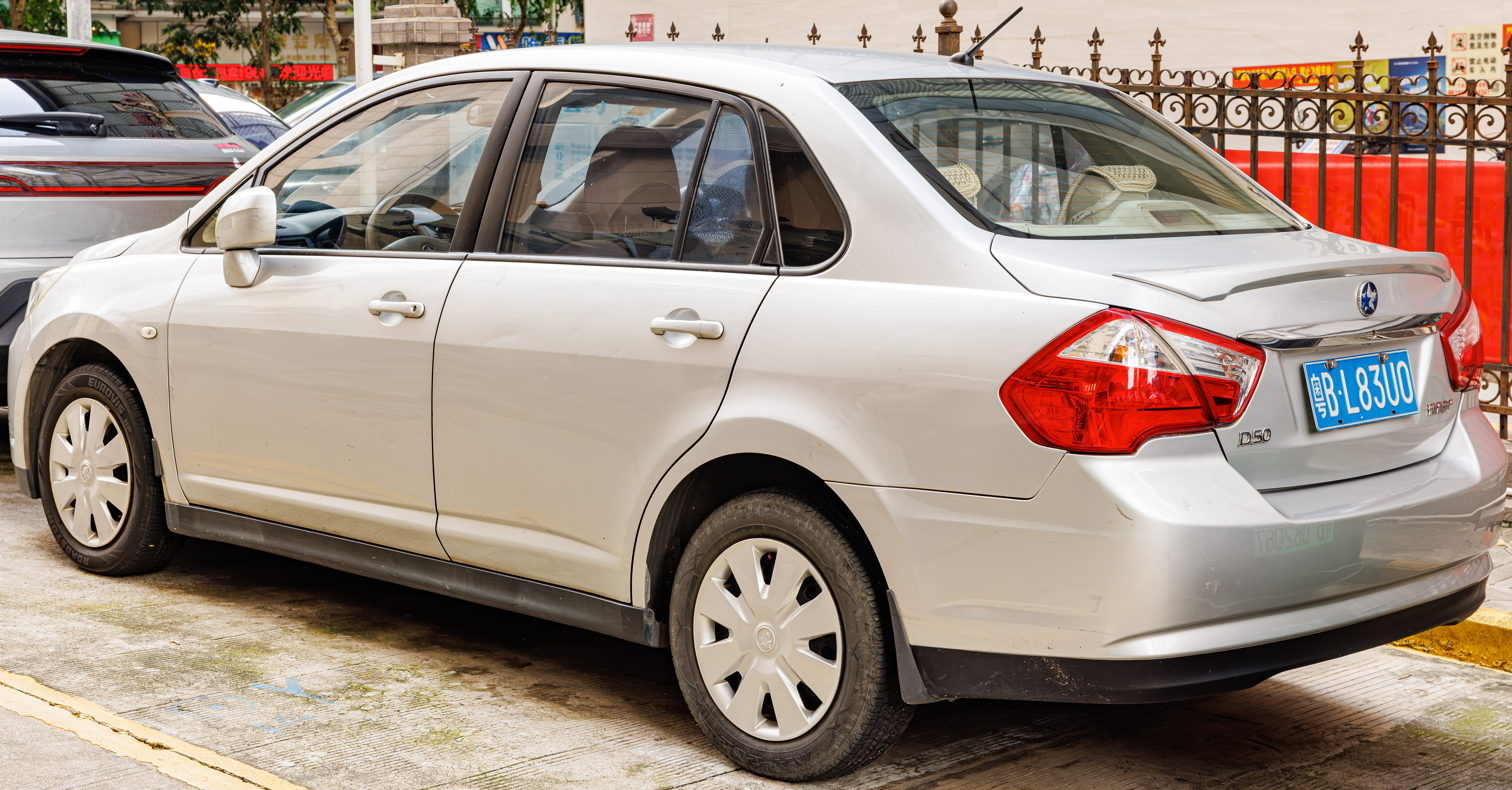
Venucia D50 (rear; China)

=== Facelift ===
In January 2008, Nissan introduced facelifted versions of both the hatchback and the sedan. They were enhanced with some key changes including new exterior features and interior designs, retuned power steering, powertrain enhancements and a new Plus navi HDD package called CarWings in Japan.

The exterior features a new grille, front bumper, headlights, tail lights, rear bumper and new wheel covers. The interior sports a more modern look as well as better visibility and usability, new instrument cluster design and metallic-finish dash panels.

The C11 started to be phased out in China first, during 2011 when partially replaced by the larger, compact class C12 Tiida/Pulsar hatchback. In 2012, the C11 began to be withdrawn from more markets as its main production bases ceased manufacture. The C11 was also replaced by the subcompact Nissan Note or Versa Note (E12) hatchback, and on the sedan fronts, by the subcompact Almera/Latio/Sunny/Versa (N17) and the compact Nissan Pulsar/Sentra/Sylphy (B17).

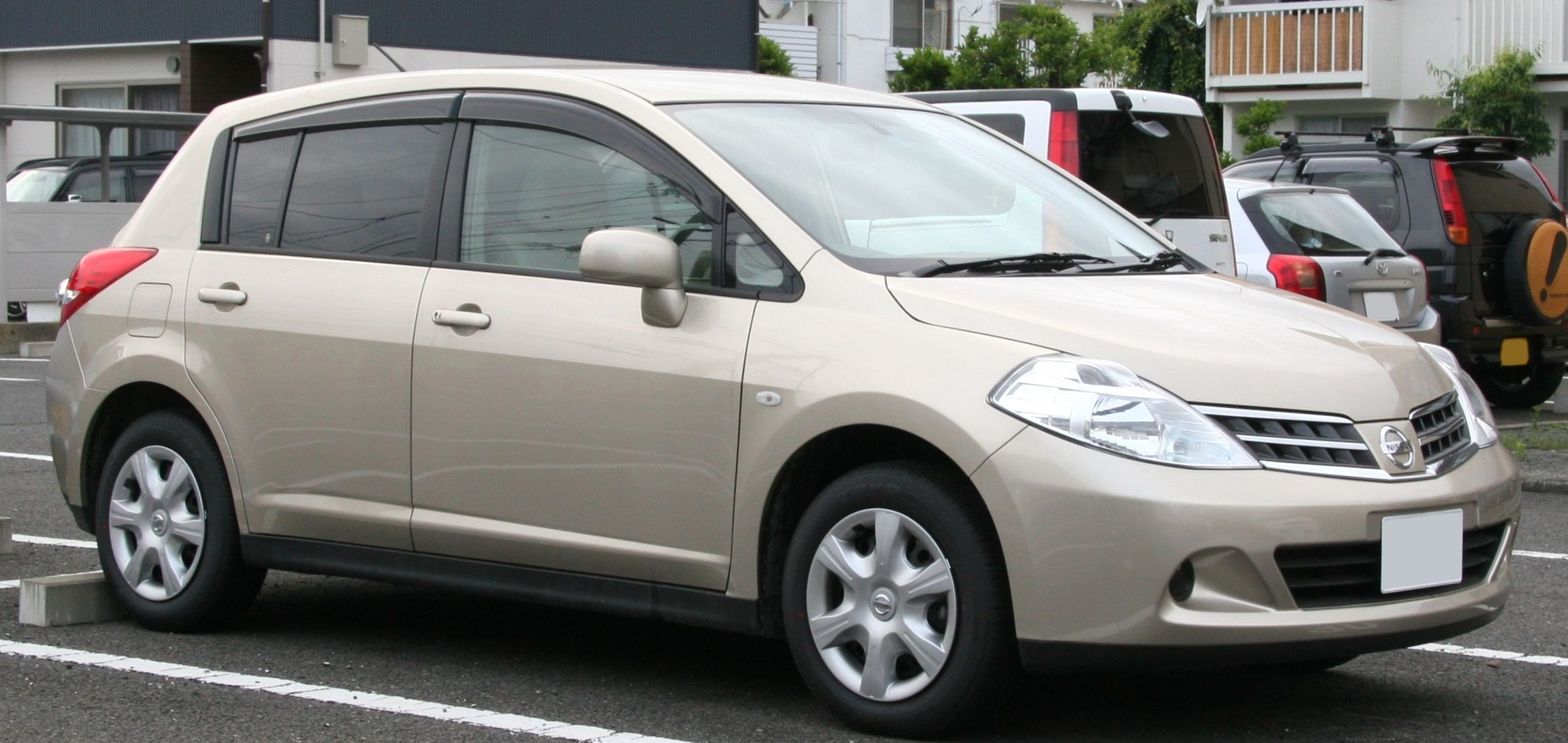
Facelift Nissan Tiida hatchback (Japan)

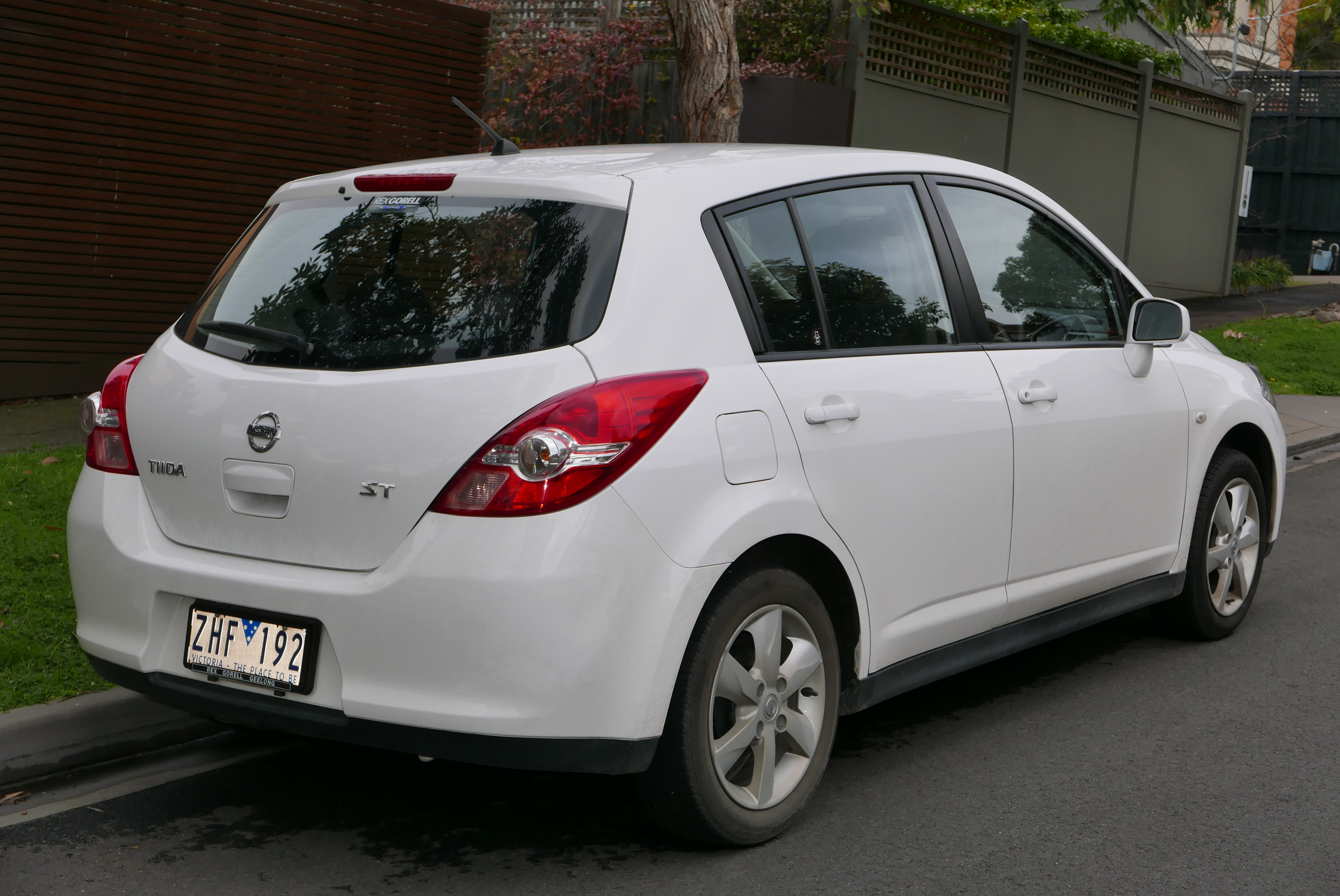
Facelift Nissan Tiida ST hatchback (Australia)

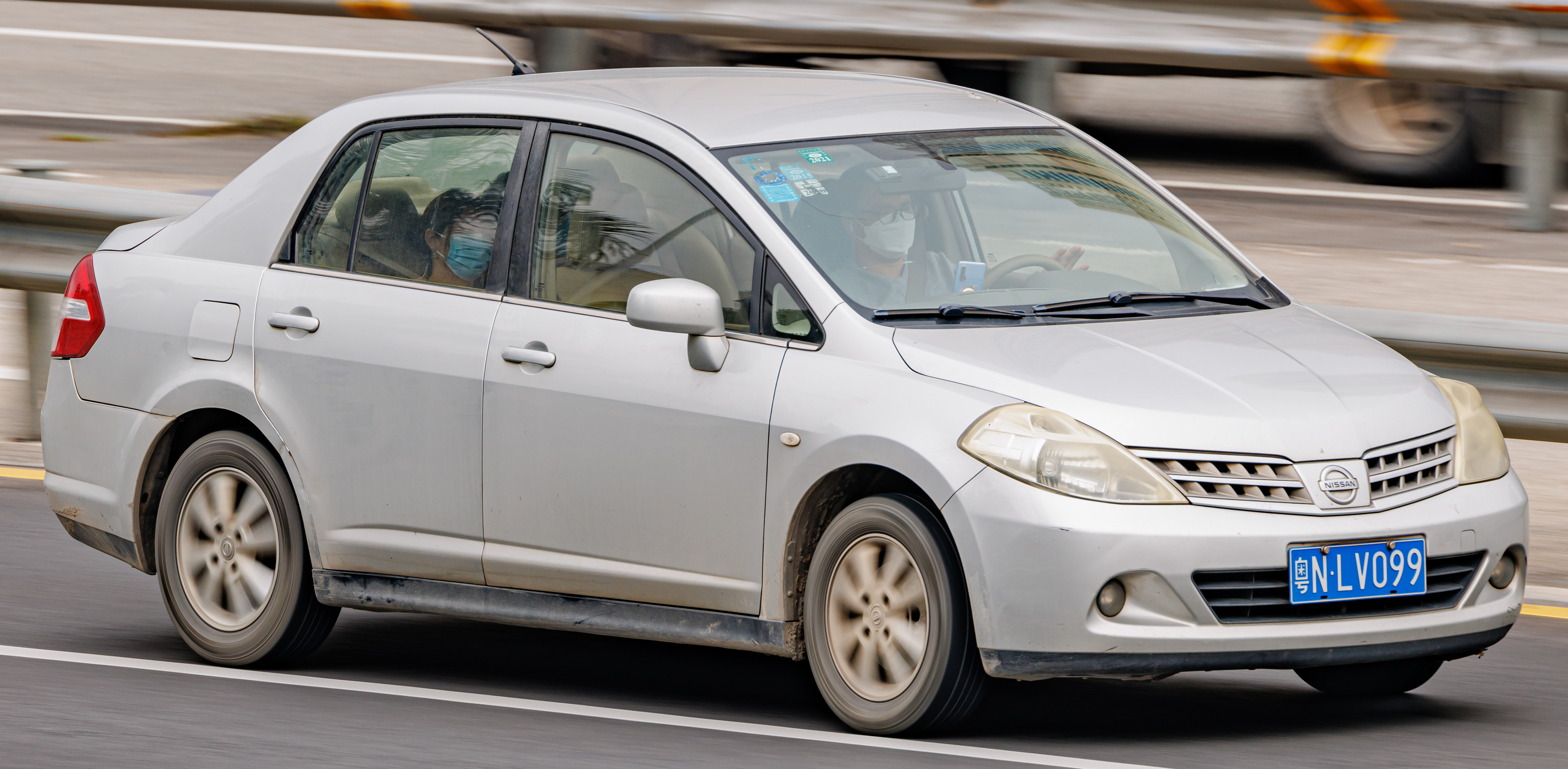
Facelift Nissan Tiida sedan (China)

=== Safety ===
The Tiida Hatch in its most basic Latin American version with one airbag received 3 stars for adult occupants and 1 star for toddlers from Latin NCAP 1.0 in May 2011.

Latin NCAP 1.0 test results Nissan Tiida hatch + 1 Airbag (2011, based on Euro NCAP 1997)
Test	Points	Stars
Adult occupant:	9.54/17.0	3 /5 stars
Child occupant:	8.00/49.00	1 /5 stars

The Tiida Hatch with two airbags received 4 stars for adult occupants and 1 star for toddlers from Latin NCAP 1.0 in November 2011.

Latin NCAP 1.0 test results Nissan Tiida Hatch + 2 Airbags (2011, based on Euro NCAP 1997)
Test	Points	Stars
Adult occupant:	13.12/17.0	4 /5 stars
Child occupant:	9.29/49.00	1 /5 stars

The Tiida Sedan in its most basic Latin American version with no airbags and no ABS received 0 stars for adult occupants and 2 stars for toddlers from Latin NCAP 1.0 in April 2015.

Latin NCAP 1.5 test results Nissan Tiida Sedan - NO Airbags (2015, similar to Euro NCAP 2002)
Test	Points	Stars
Adult occupant:	0.00/17.0	0 /5 stars
Child occupant:	16.41/49.00	1 /5 stars

The Tiida Sedan with two airbags and no ABS received 4 stars for adult occupants and 2 stars for toddlers from Latin NCAP 1.0 in September 2015.

Latin NCAP 1.5 test results Nissan Tiida Sedan + 2 Airbags (2015, similar to Euro NCAP 2002)
Test	Points	Stars
Adult occupant:	13.08/17.0	4 /5 stars
Child occupant:	18.67/49.00	2 /5 stars

ANCAP test results Nissan Tiida variants with 2 airbags (2006)
Test	Score
Overall	4 /5 stars
Frontal offset	12.22/16
Side impact	13.28/16
Pole	Not Assessed
Seat belt reminders	0/3
Whiplash protection	Not Assessed
Pedestrian protection	Marginal
Electronic stability control	Not Assessed

=== Marketing ===
Asia

In mainland China, the Tiida is produced by the Dongfeng Motor Company, a joint venture between Nissan and a local company.

In Malaysia, the first generation Tiida was sold as the Latio and was available in both sedan and hatchback body styles. The sedan was simply known as Latio while the hatchback was known as the Latio Sport. Unveiled in May 2007 and available in June 2007, four variants were initially offered for the sedan body style: 1.6 ST (M), 1.6 ST (A), 1.6 ST-L (A), 1.8 Ti (A). The hatchback was available in a sole 1.6 ST-L (A) variant. In April 2008, a limited 'Tuned By Impul' edition was available for both variants. The 'Tuned By Impul' edition featured a body kit, sports suspension, different exhaust system and different alloy wheels. In September 2011, the facelift version of Latio reduced the variant count to just two. A sole 1.6 variant for the sedan and a sole 1.8 variant for the hatchback.

In Singapore, the Tiida and Tiida Latio were initially sold alongside the older and cheaper Sunny N16 and the bigger and more expensive Sylphy.

In Indonesia, the Latio 1.8 hatchback was marketed for private use, while the 1.6 sedan was for taxi fleet only, this car imported from Thailand.

In Hong Kong, the Tiida was used as a police car by the Hong Kong police. Some were police patrol cars whereas some were airport police cars.

In Taiwan, both Tiida hatchback and Tiida sedan are produced by Yulon. The Tiida sedan was still in production until May 2018.

North America

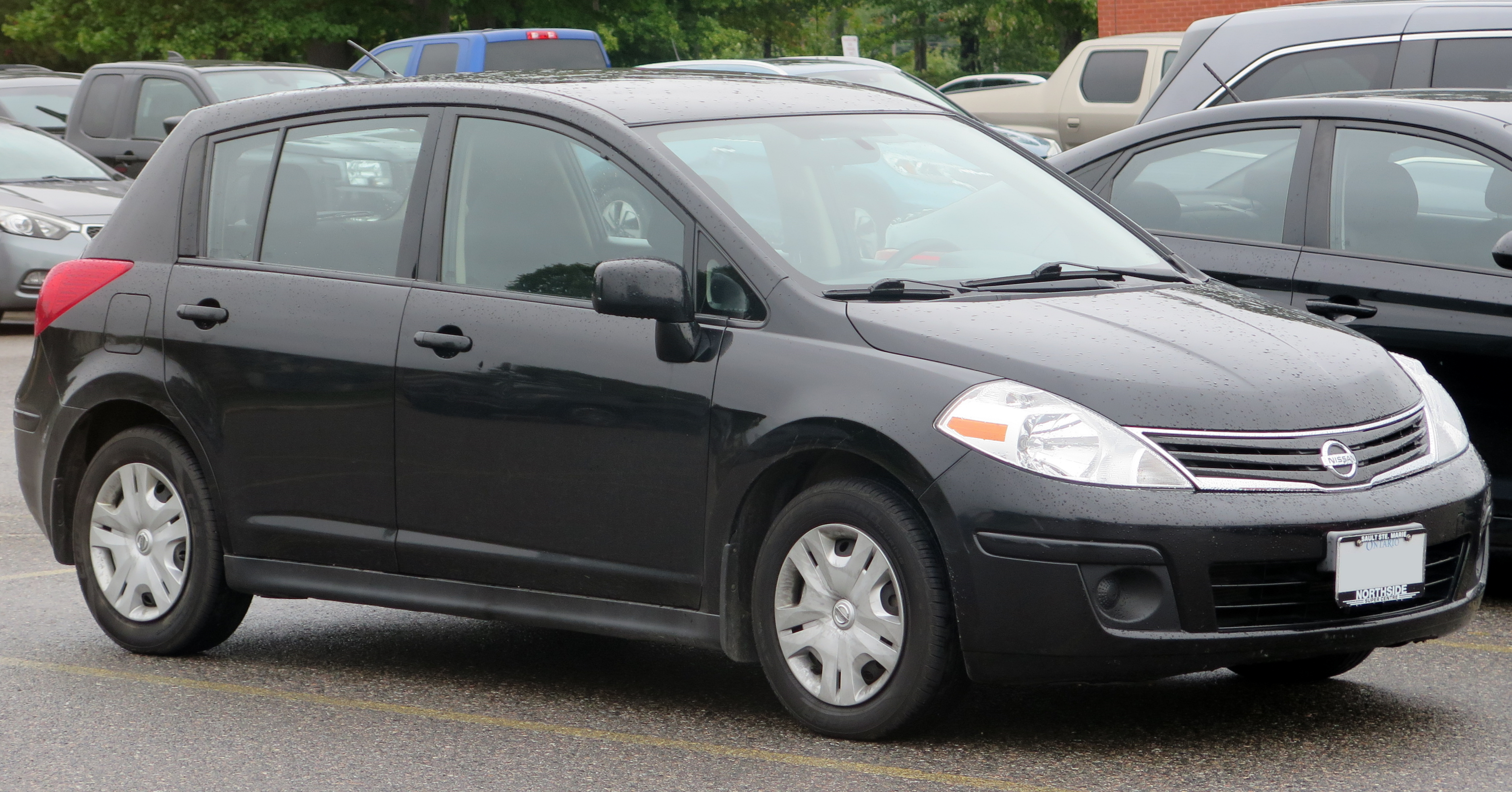

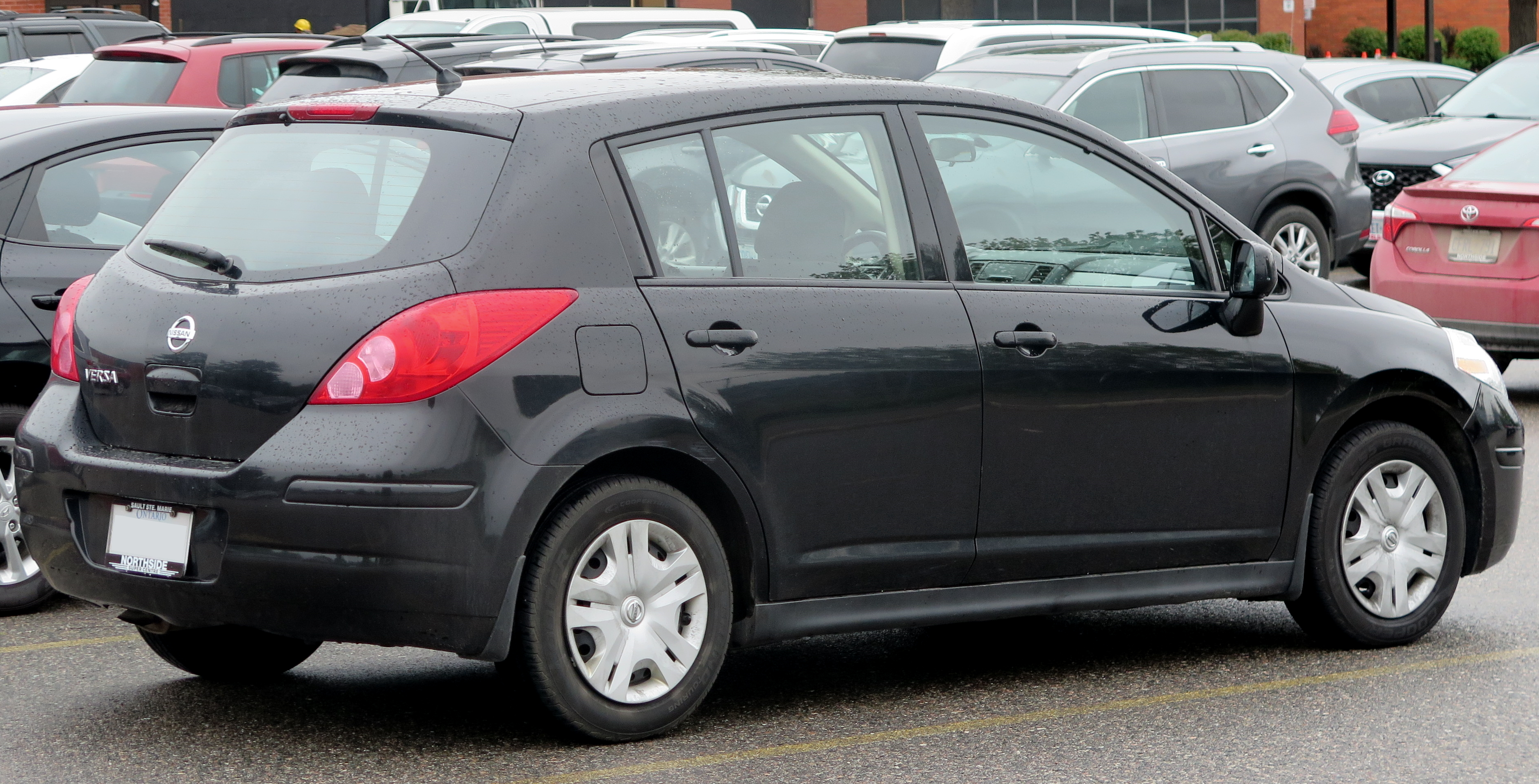
2012 Nissan Versa 1.8 S (Canada)

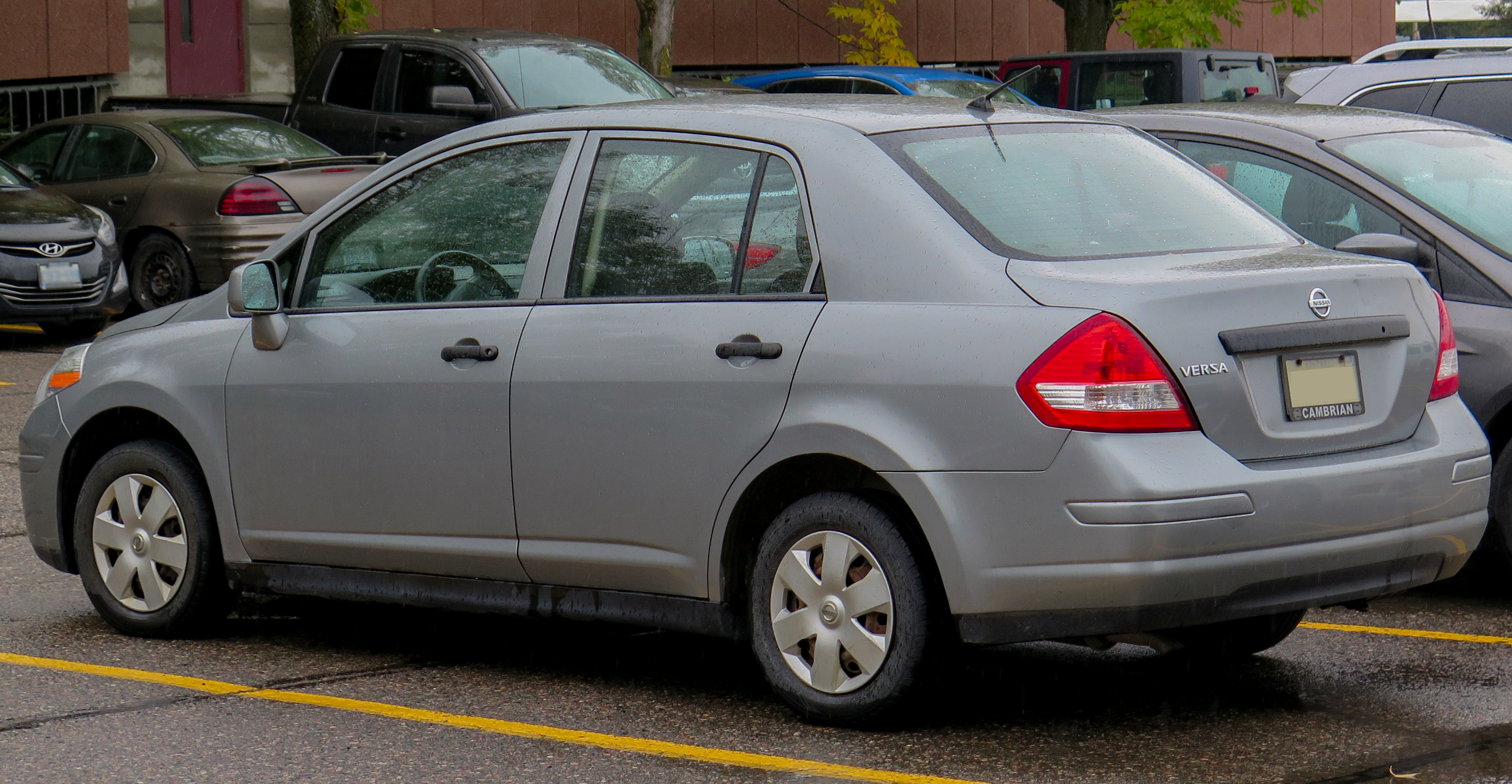
2010 Nissan Versa 1.6 S Sedan (Canada)

The Versa was introduced in the United States and Canada in July 2006 as a 2007 model. North and Latin American models of the Tiida use a DOHC 1.8-liter gasoline engine and are assembled at Nissan's Aguascalientes, Mexico assembly plant. It is also the only Nissan four-door passenger car in the United States and Canada to be sold worldwide, since the Sentra, Altima and Maxima are exclusive to North America.

According to a Nissan press release in 2008, "versa" is short for "versatile space" meant to imply the spaciousness of the interior and configurable cargo arrangements.

The North American Versa debuted at the 2006 North American International Auto Show in January of the same year. The hatchback model was introduced first, with the sedan arriving later at the end of the year, both as 2007 models. A 1.6-liter sedan replaced the 1.8-liter sedan in Canada for the 2009 model year, that year in the United States the 1.6 sedan was added to the lineup along the 1.8 sedan.

The Versa is powered by a 1.8 L I4 MR series engine producing 122 hp (91 kW) and 127 ft·lbf (170 N·m). Three transmissions are offered: a four-speed automatic, a continuously variable transmission (CVT), and a six-speed manual. Two trim levels include the S and SL—the SL offering air conditioning, power accessories and ABS, all of which are options on the S. The Versa SL also has features/options not available on the S such as cruise control (available on some S models), alloy wheels, optional CVT (the four-speed automatic is only available for the Versa S but CVT is available on some S models), optional Bluetooth connectivity for electronic devices, and a sport package which adds a power moonroof, rear spoiler, and underside aero kit.

Introduced for the 2009 model year in sedan form only, is the Versa 1.6-liter which uses the HR16DE inline-four gasoline engine, rated at 107 hp (80 kW) and 111 lb⋅ft (150 N⋅m) of torque. The base transmission is a five-speed manual; a four-speed automatic is optional.

The Versa 1.6 features black trim (instead of body-colored) for the exterior mirror housings, license plate trim, and front grille; 14-inch steel wheels; black interior; four radio speakers with pre-wiring for a radio—but no radio itself. Safety features include six airbags, active front head restraints, and a tire pressure monitoring system. Air conditioning, AM/FM/CD audio system, power windows, power door locks, power mirrors, and keyless entry are offered as part of a value package. Anti-lock brakes with electronic brake force distribution (EBD) and brake assist are optional ($250) on top of the value package.

When it was introduced in fall 2008, the Versa's base price of US$9,990 made it the least expensive new car available in the United States, but a price cut to the Hyundai Accent usurped that distinction by $20. The Versa 1.6's $12,498 Canadian base price also undercut its competitors at launch.

2010 models featured a redesigned grille and a new design for the 1.8S model's wheel covers. In North America, the sedan was replaced by its second generation starting the 2012 model year (hence, 2011 being its last). The fate of the hatchback was however extended for one more year, 2012 being its last. Production of both for that market stopped in mid-2011.

The Tiida sedan was discontinued in Mexico, and was replaced by the new Versa in October 2019.

Latin America

On 11 January 2008, Chrysler LLC and Nissan Motor Co., Ltd. announced an agreement for Nissan to supply Chrysler with a new car based on Nissan Versa sedan for limited distribution in Latin America in 2009. The model was named as Trazo by Dodge and was revealed in São Paulo International Motor Show in Brazil. However the plan failed to materialise, as it coincided with the arrival of Fiat in Chrysler capital in early 2009.

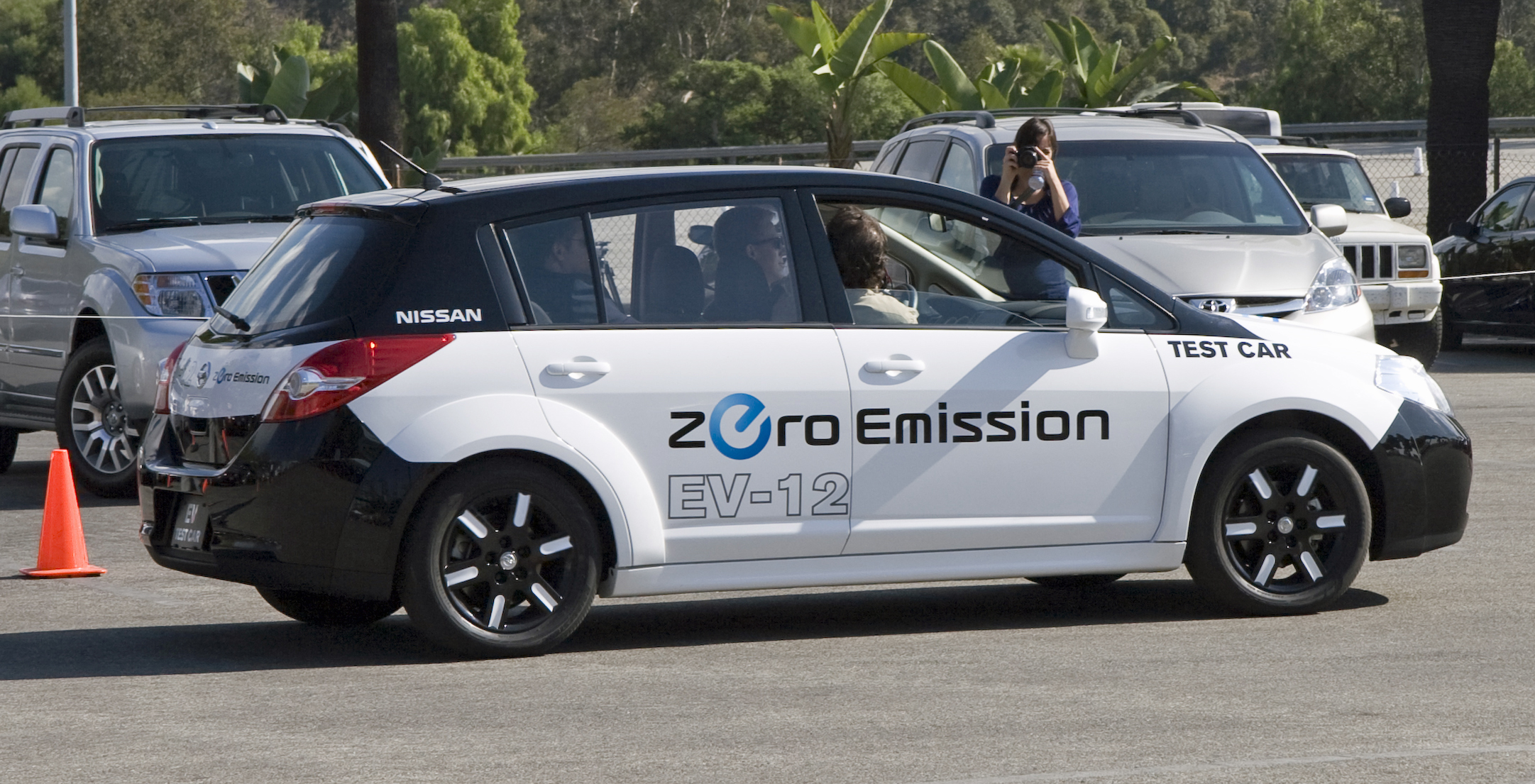
Nissan EV-12 test car

=== Electric prototype ===
The EV-11 prototype electric car was based on Tiida and used an 80 kW (107 hp) and 280 N⋅m (207 lb⋅ft) electric motor, 24 kWh lithium-ion battery pack rated 160 km (99 mi) distance, navigation system, EV remote control and monitoring.

The prototype vehicle was unveiled at Nissan's Yokohama headquarters on 8 February 2009. Production version was set to begin sale in US and Japan in 2010.

== Second generation (C12; 2011) ==
Second generation
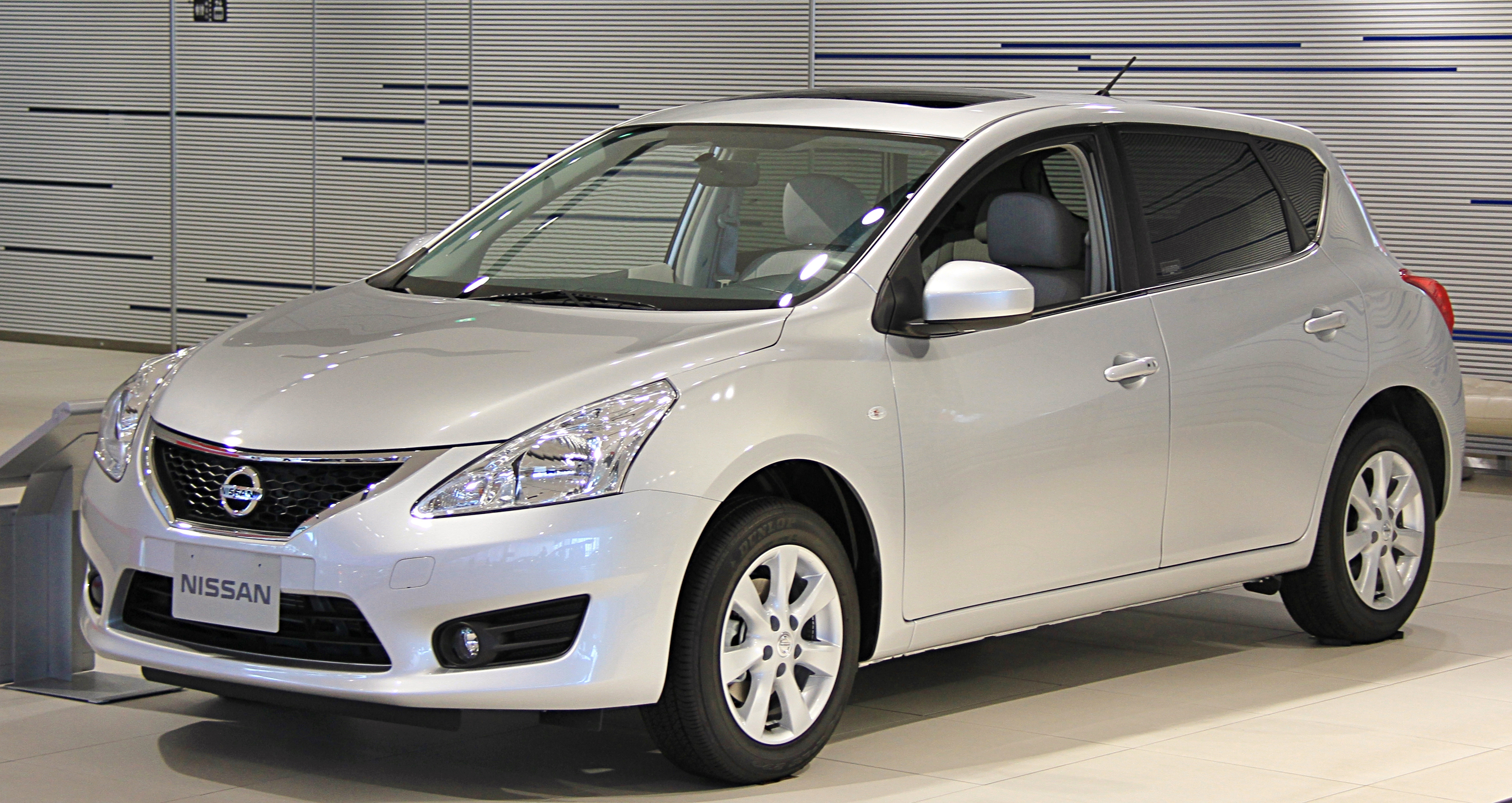
- Nissan Tiida (China)

Overview
- Model code: C12
- Also called: Nissan Pulsar (Thailand, Australia, New Zealand)
- Production: 2011–2016 (China); 2013–2018 (Thailand); 2013–2023 (Taiwan)
- Assembly: Japan: Kanda, Fukuoka (Kyushu Plant); China: Guangzhou (DMCL); Taiwan: Miaoli County; Thailand: Samut Prakan

Body and chassis
- Body style: 5-door hatchback
- Layout: Front-engine, front-wheel-drive
- Platform: Nissan V platform
- Related: Nissan Pulsar (C13); Nissan Sylphy/Sentra/Pulsar (B17)

Powertrain
- Engine: Petrol: 1.6 L HR16DE I4; 1.6 L MR16DDT I4 turbo; 1.8 L MRA8DE I4; Diesel: 1.5 L K9K764 I4
- Transmission: 5-speed manual CVT

Dimensions
- Wheelbase: 2,700 mm (106.3 in)
- Length: 4,295 mm (169.1 in)
- Width: 1,760 mm (69.3 in)
- Height: 1,520 mm (59.8 in)
- Curb weight: 1,206–1,257 kg (2,659–2,771 lb)

The second generation, C12 series of the Nissan Tiida was unveiled in April 2011 at the Shanghai Auto Show. Sales in China commenced in June 2011. It is available only as a five-door hatchback, and is notably not sold in Japan. The C11 Tiida sedan was instead replaced by the Nissan Almera/Latio/Sunny/Versa (N17) and Nissan Pulsar/Sentra/Sylphy (B17). The C12 Tiida is in fact heavily related to the Sylphy B17—both base their construction on the Nissan V platform and share substantial mechanicals. The Thai manufactured versions even share the Sylphy B17's interior, while the original Chinese and Taiwanese models feature a distinctive design. Powertrains also remain common between C12 and B17 models.

Instead of being sized and marketed as both a subcompact or a compact car depending on the country, the second-generation Tiida was marketed as a C-segment worldwide as the March/Micra hatchback and the N17 series sedan took the role to serve the B-segment market.

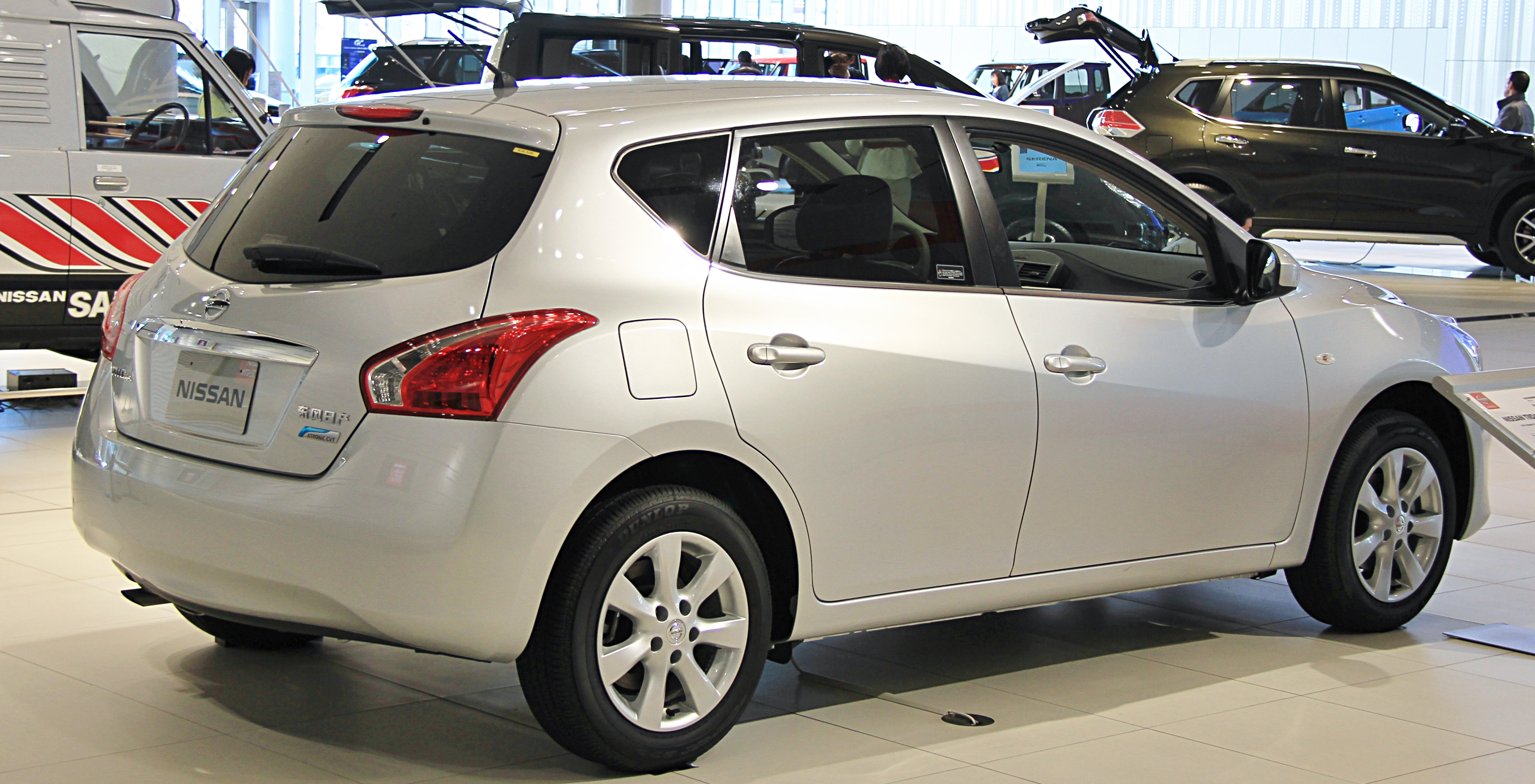
Rear view

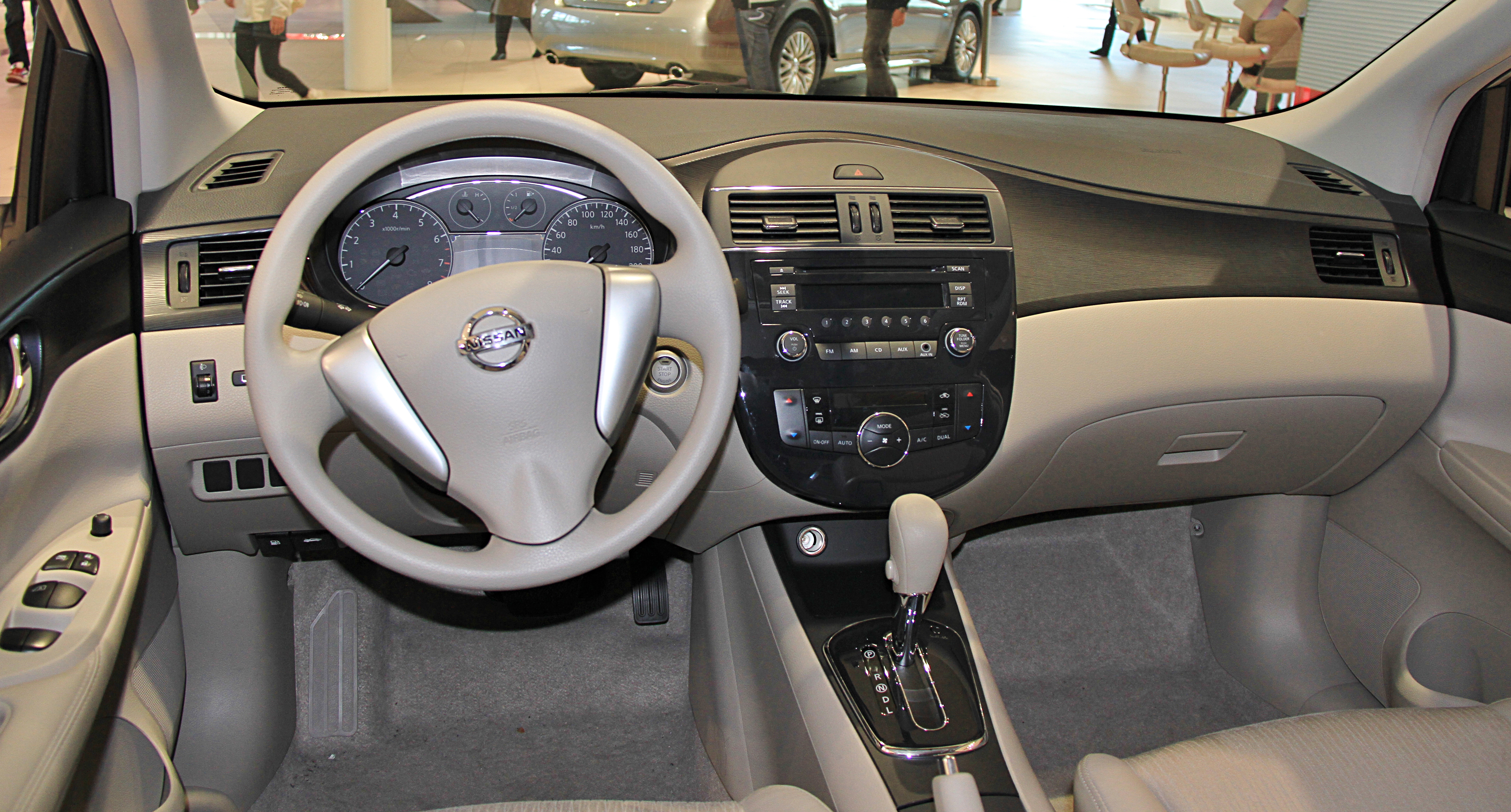
Interior (China-built model)

=== Marketing ===
Asia

In Thailand, the Tiida hatchback is called the Nissan Pulsar, which went on sale by February 2013. The Tiida hatchback comes with MRA8DE 1.8-litre engine, which it shares with the Nissan Sylphy. In Taiwan, the Tiida hatchback is known as the "Big Tiida" in advertisement due to the size upgrade and went on sale in January 2013.

Australia

In Australia, the Tiida name was dropped in favour of a return to using Nissan Pulsar, which was a very popular nameplate up to 2005.

The SSS high performance version with a 1.6-litre turbocharged engine arrived in late 2013. It was aimed at the "warm" hatch market which is a category placed between standard and hot hatches. It featured a 140 kilowatt turbocharged MR16DDT engine found in the Nissan Pulsar ST-S variant. It is also found in the Nissan Juke ST-S and TI-S. The engine was connected to either a close ratio 6-speed manual transmission or Continuously Variable Transmission (CVT). Premium features included push start ignition, keyless entry, dusk sensing headlights, dual climate control and satellite navigation.

Middle East

In the Middle East, the Tiida was available with a 1.6 or 1.8-litre engine.

=== Facelift (Taiwan) ===
Instead of updating to the C13 Tiida/Pulsar, the C12 Tiida was facelifted exclusively in the Taiwanese market conducted by Yulon Motors. The facelift was a budget update to keep the appearance of the C12 Tiida in Taiwan in line with the C13 Tiida in other markets. The facelift replaces the front and rear light units with redesigned set up and light strips, front and rear bumpers, and the front grille. The new front grille features the updated Nissan V motion styling and the rear bumper was designed to mimic those on the C13 Tiida.

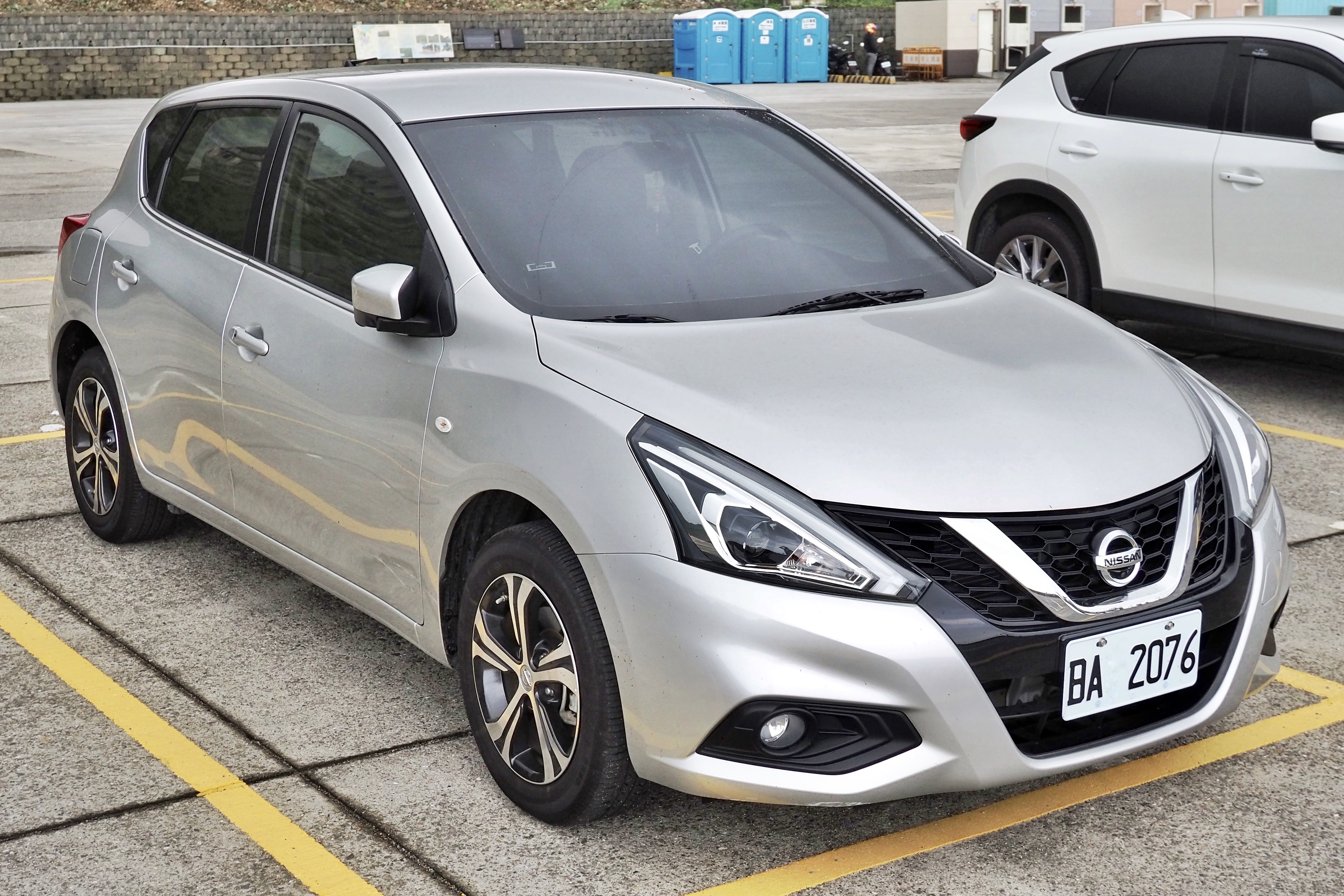
Front view of Nissan iTiida (2017 facelift)

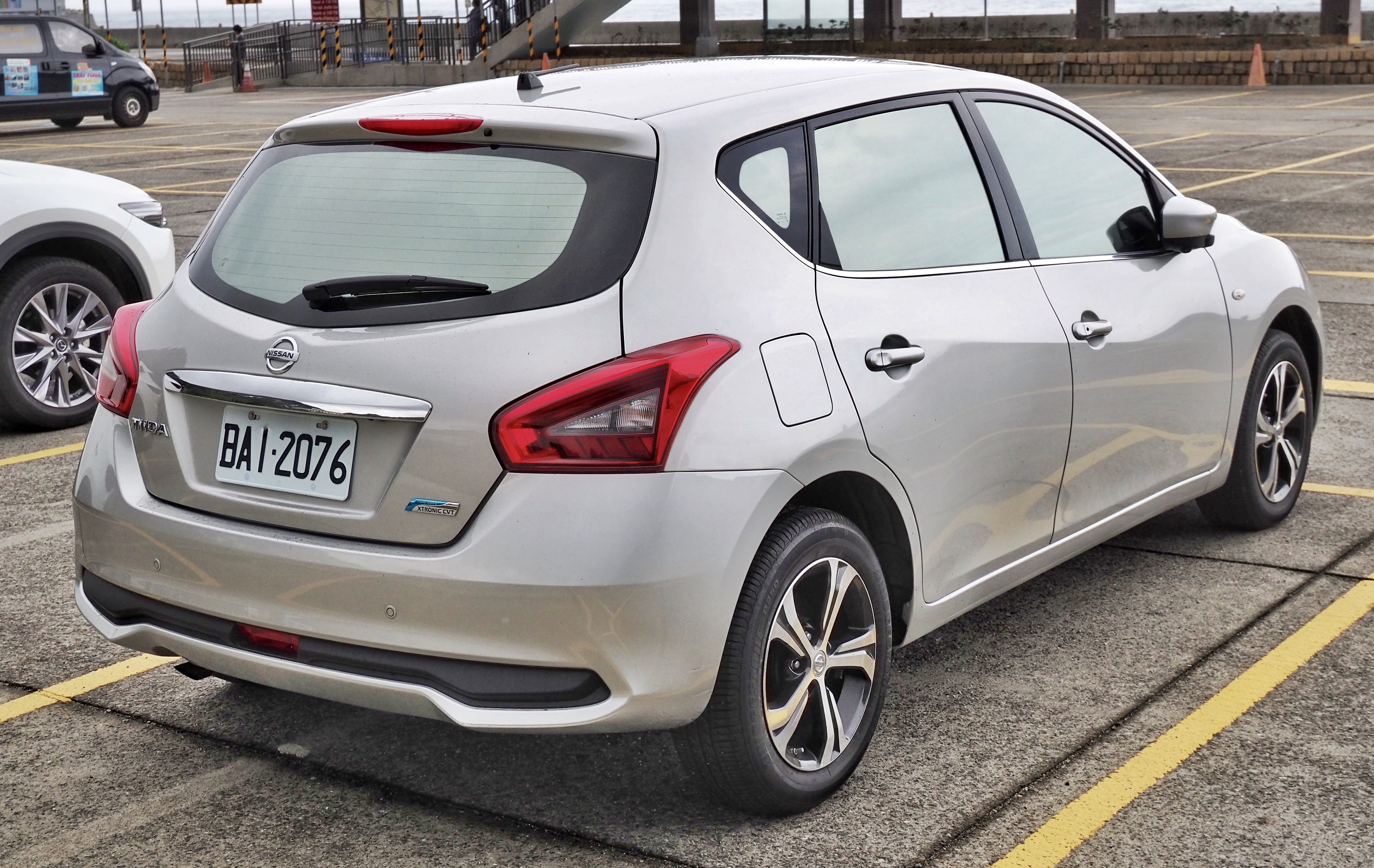
Rear view of Nissan iTiida (2017 facelift)

==== Tiida J ====
The Taiwanese market Tiida received another facelift for the 2021 model year called the Tiida J. The Tiida J features redesigned front and rear bumpers.

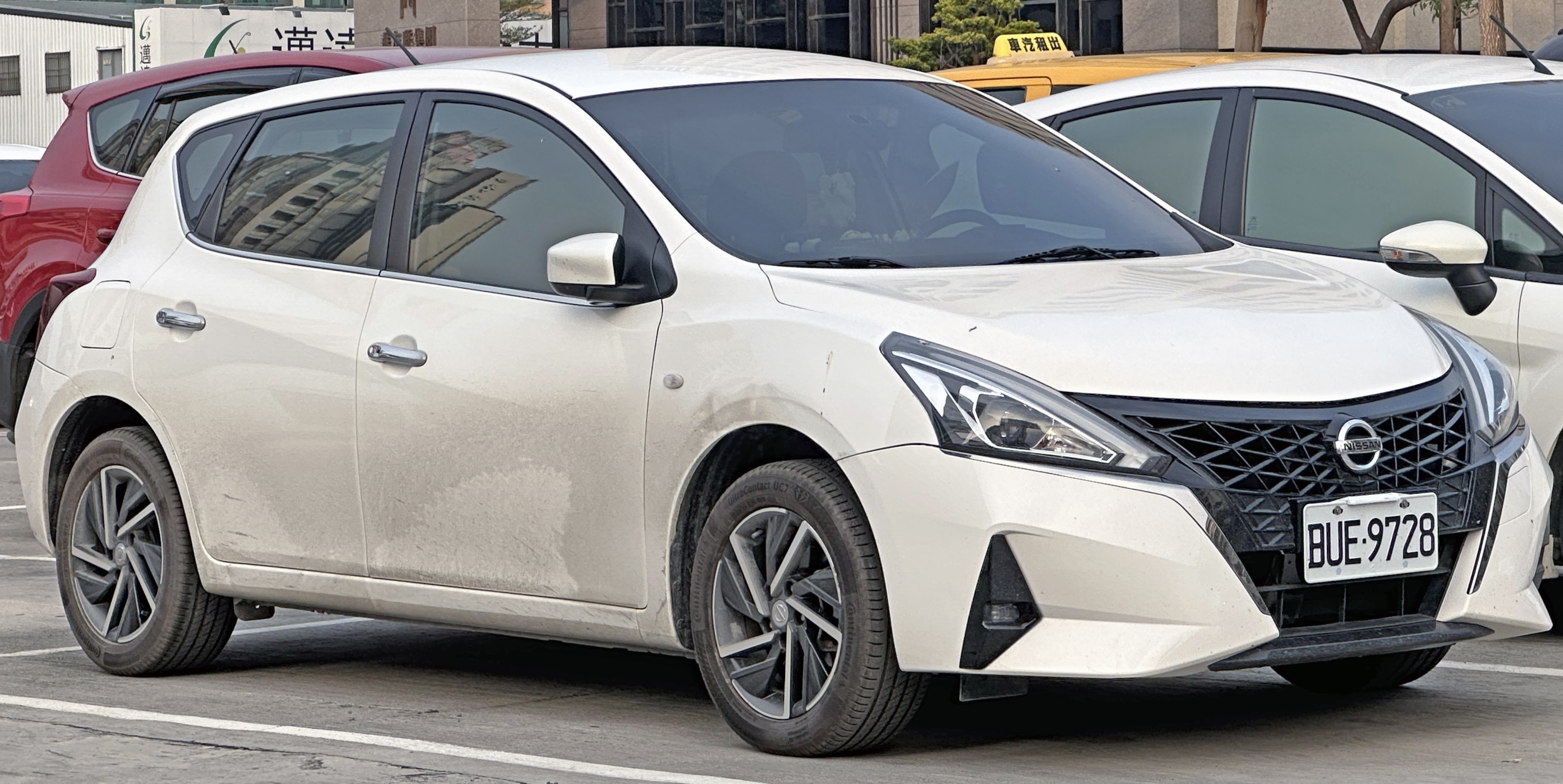
Front view of Nissan Tiida J (2021 facelift)

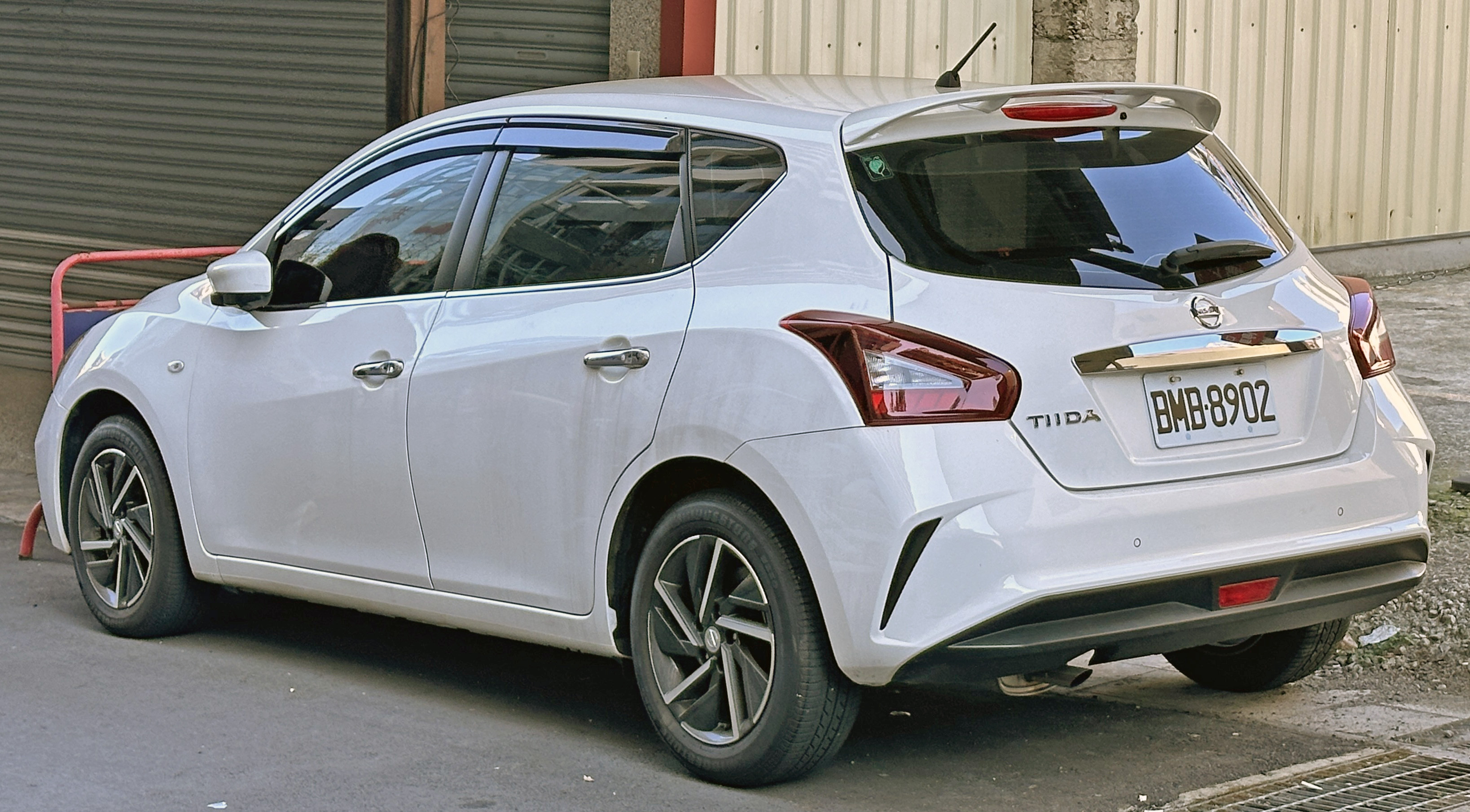
Rear view of Nissan Tiida J (2021 facelift)

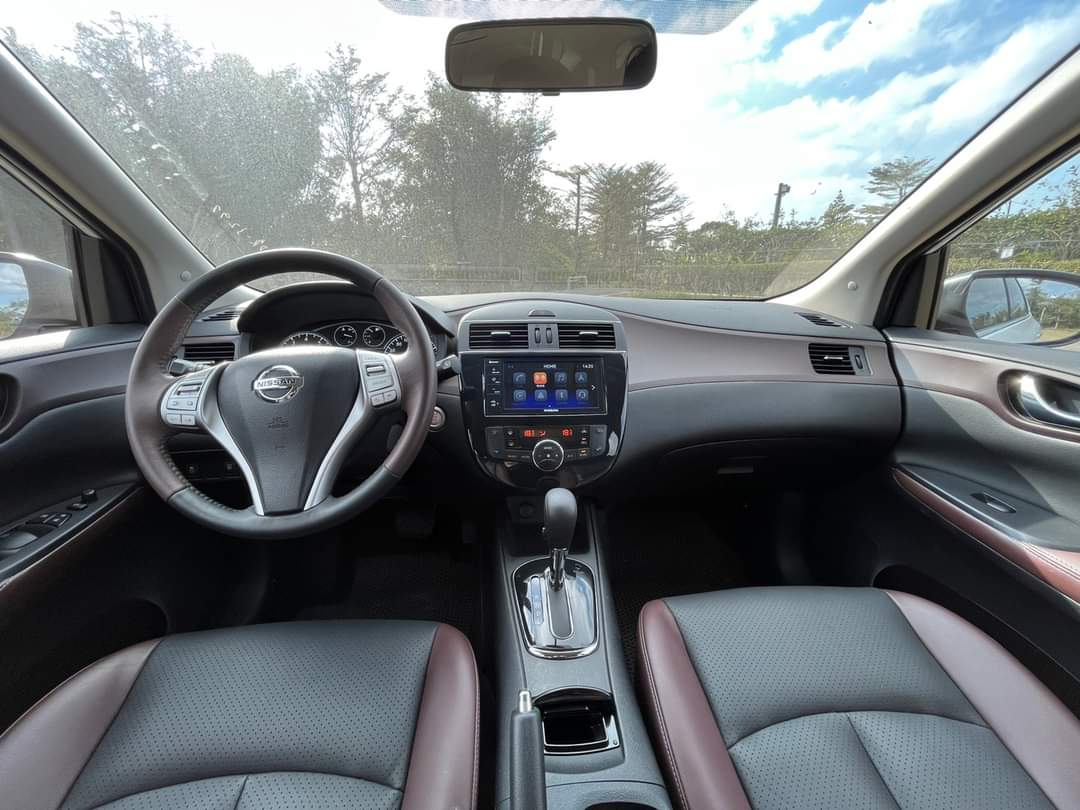
Interior of the Nissan Tiida J (2021 facelift)

== Third generation (C13; 2015) ==
Since March 2015, the Nissan Pulsar (C13), as sold in most of Europe, is sold in Russia, China and Africa under the Tiida nameplate.

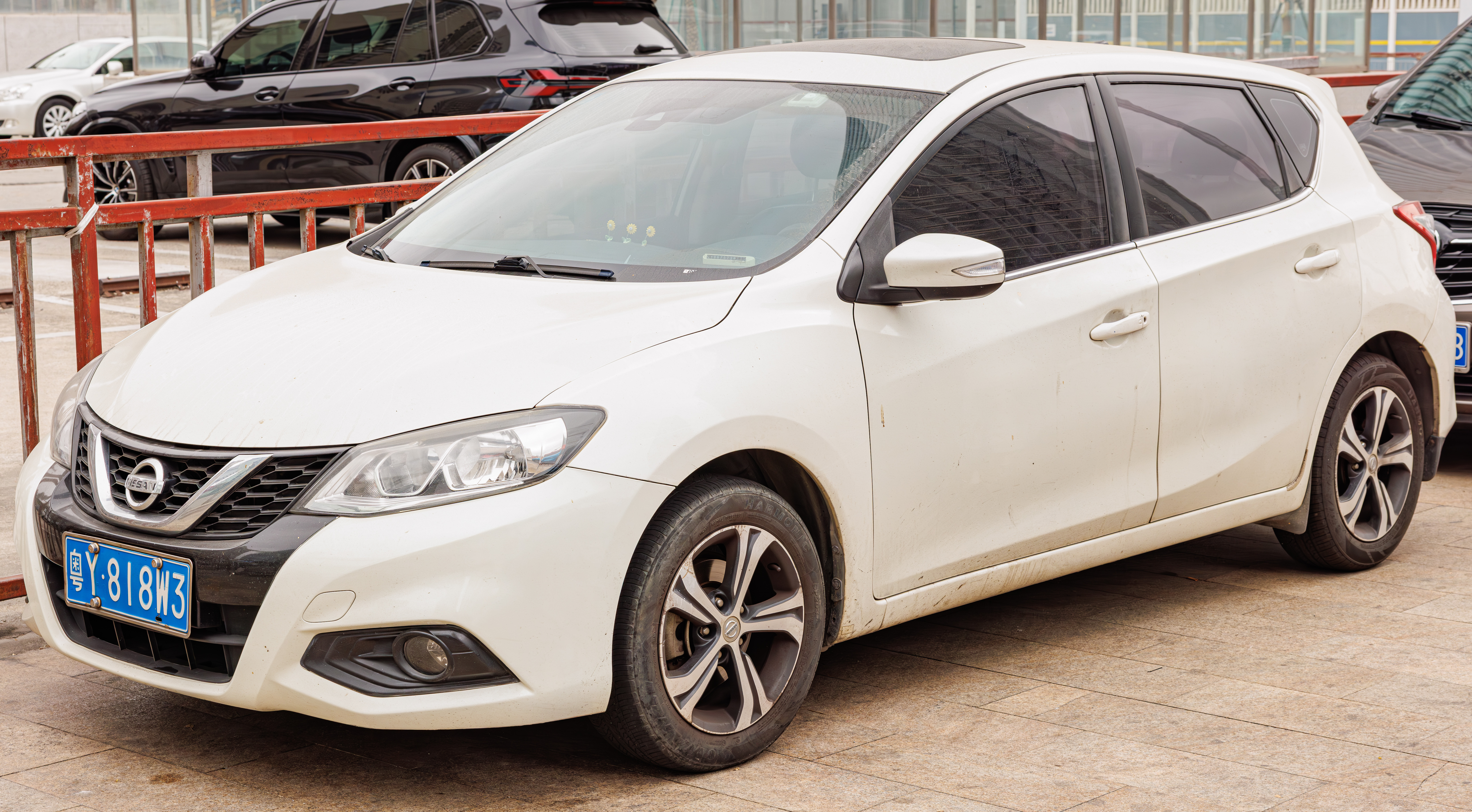
Nissan Tiida (China)

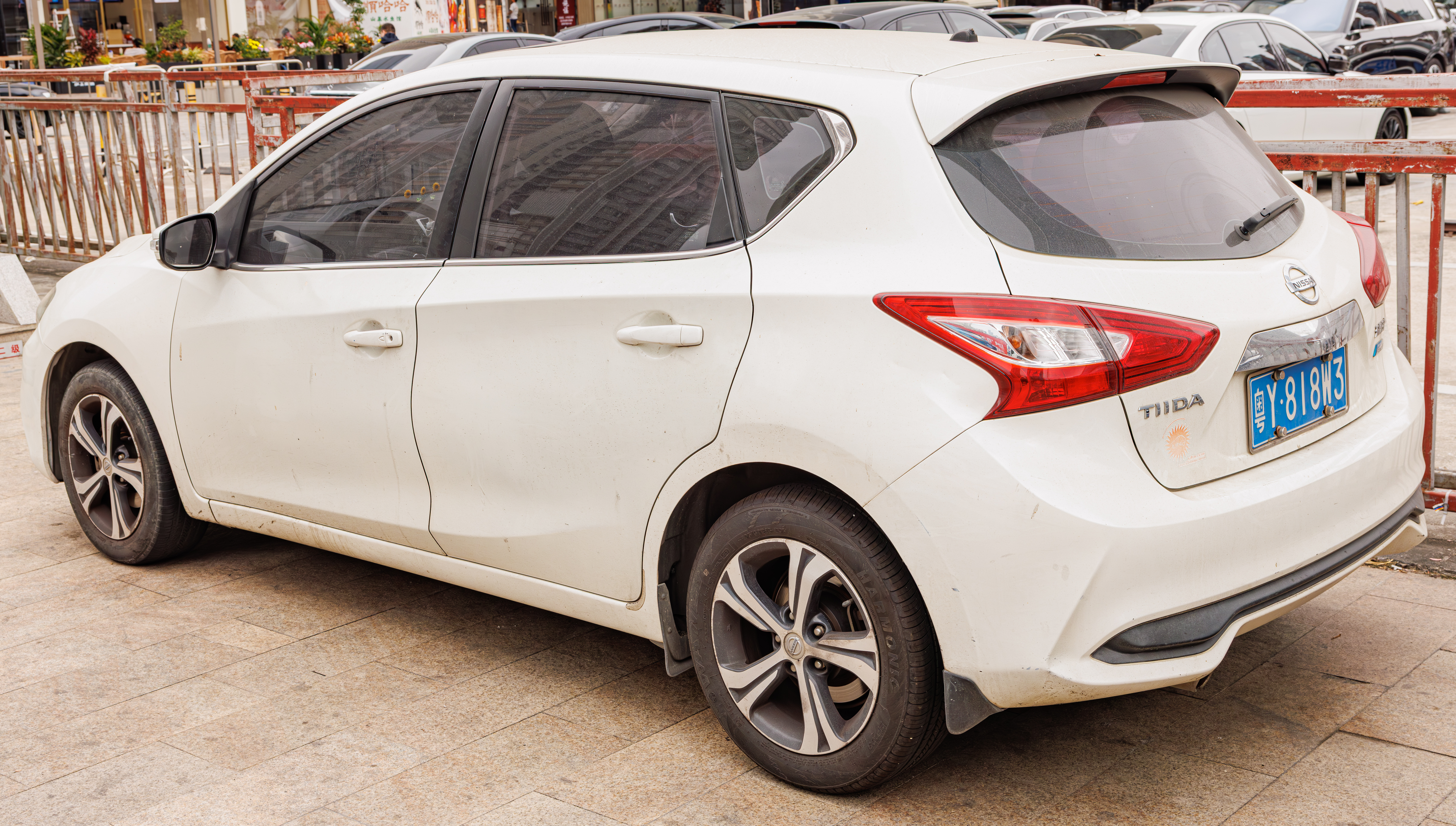
Nissan Tiida (China)

== Sales ==
Year	China		Brazil	
Year	Hatchback	Sedan	Hatchback	Sedan
2005	19,304	36,251	—N/a	—N/a
2006	57,300	49,398	—N/a	—N/a
2007	64,880	58,430	—N/a	—N/a
2008	68,214	68,979	3,280	—N/a
2009	80,282	75,568	3,882	—N/a
2010	84,617	69,289	5,663	1,473
2011	110,078	1,828	10,103	5,966
2012	144,215	1	9,103	1,509
2013	129,346	—N/a	744	14
2014	92,465	—N/a	23	—N/a
2016	40,320	—N/a	—N/a	—N/a
2017	78,712	—N/a	—N/a	—N/a
2018	59,738	—N/a	—N/a	—N/a
2019	76,195	—N/a	—N/a	—N/a
2020	60,374	—N/a	—N/a	—N/a
2021	51,448	—N/a	—N/a	—N/a
2022	25,140	—N/a	—N/a	—N/a
2023	16,689	—N/a	—N/a	—N/a
2024	15,308	—N/a	—N/a	—N/a
2025	3,490	—N/a	—N/a	—N/a
