= Nissan Versa =

Nissan Versa is an automobile nameplate used by the Japanese manufacturer Nissan in the Americas for the following models:

According to a Nissan press release in 2008, "versa" is short for "versatile space" meant to imply the spaciousness of the interior and configurable cargo arrangements.

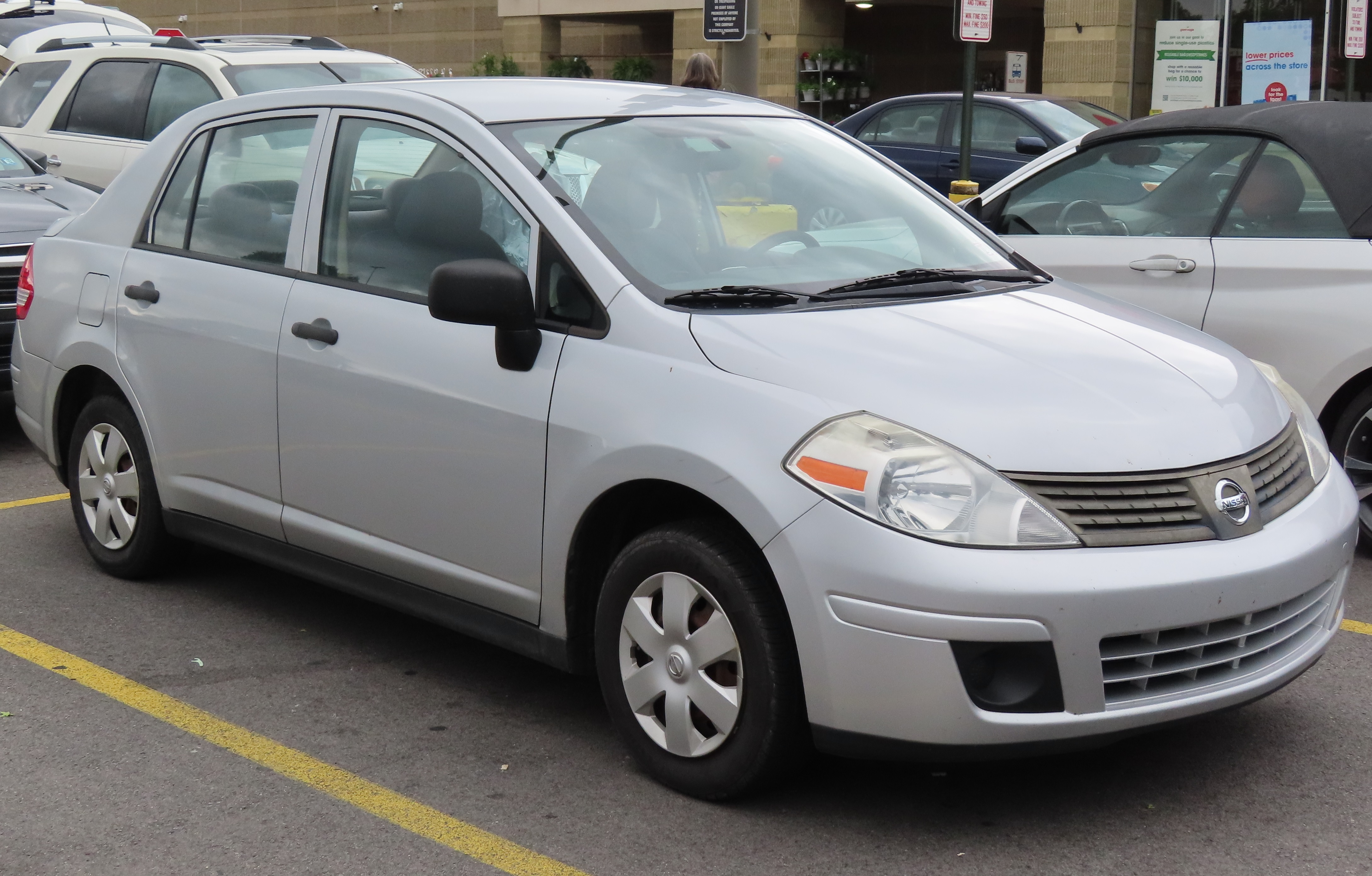
First-generation Versa sedan (C11; 2006–2012)

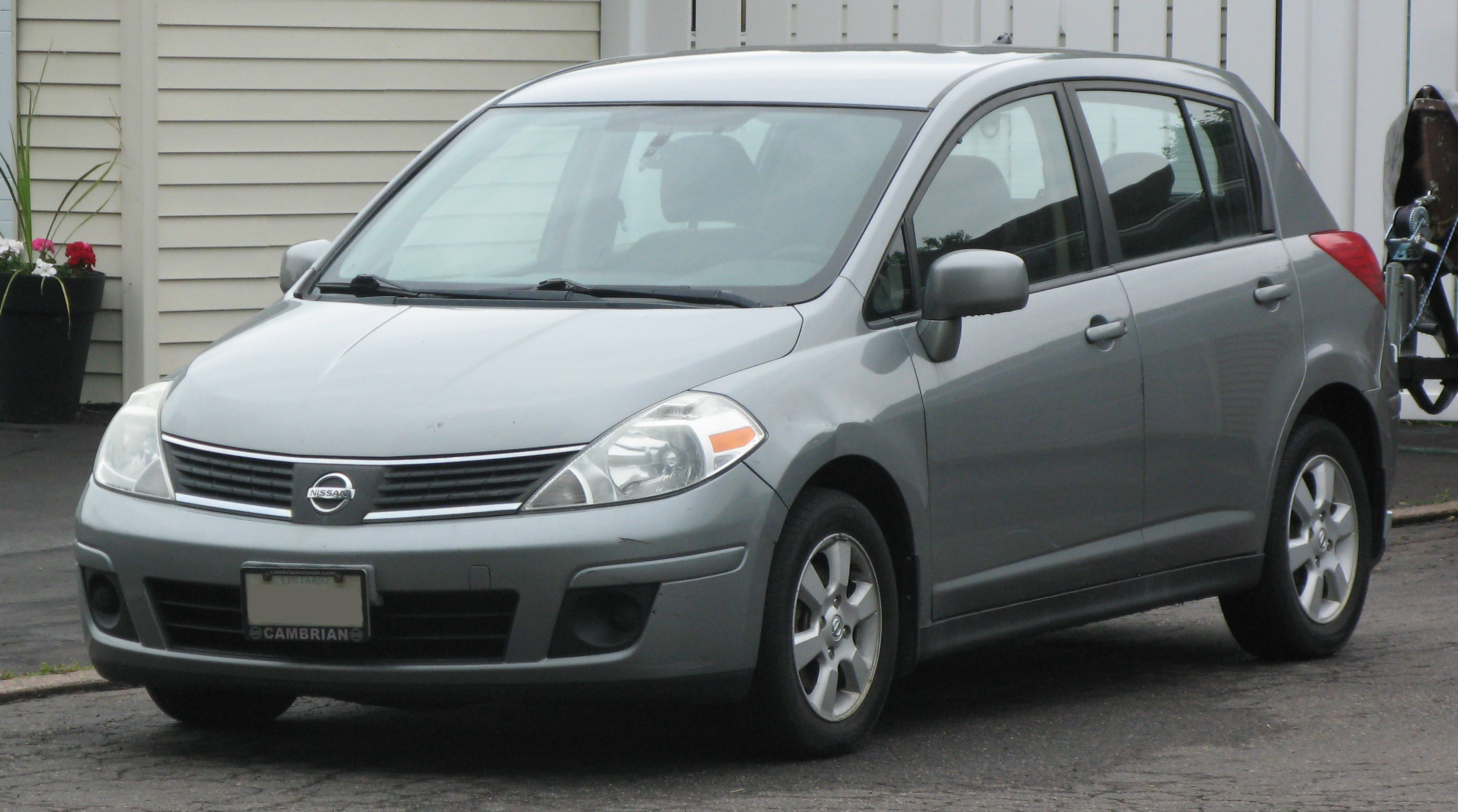
First-generation Versa hatchback (C11; 2006–2013)

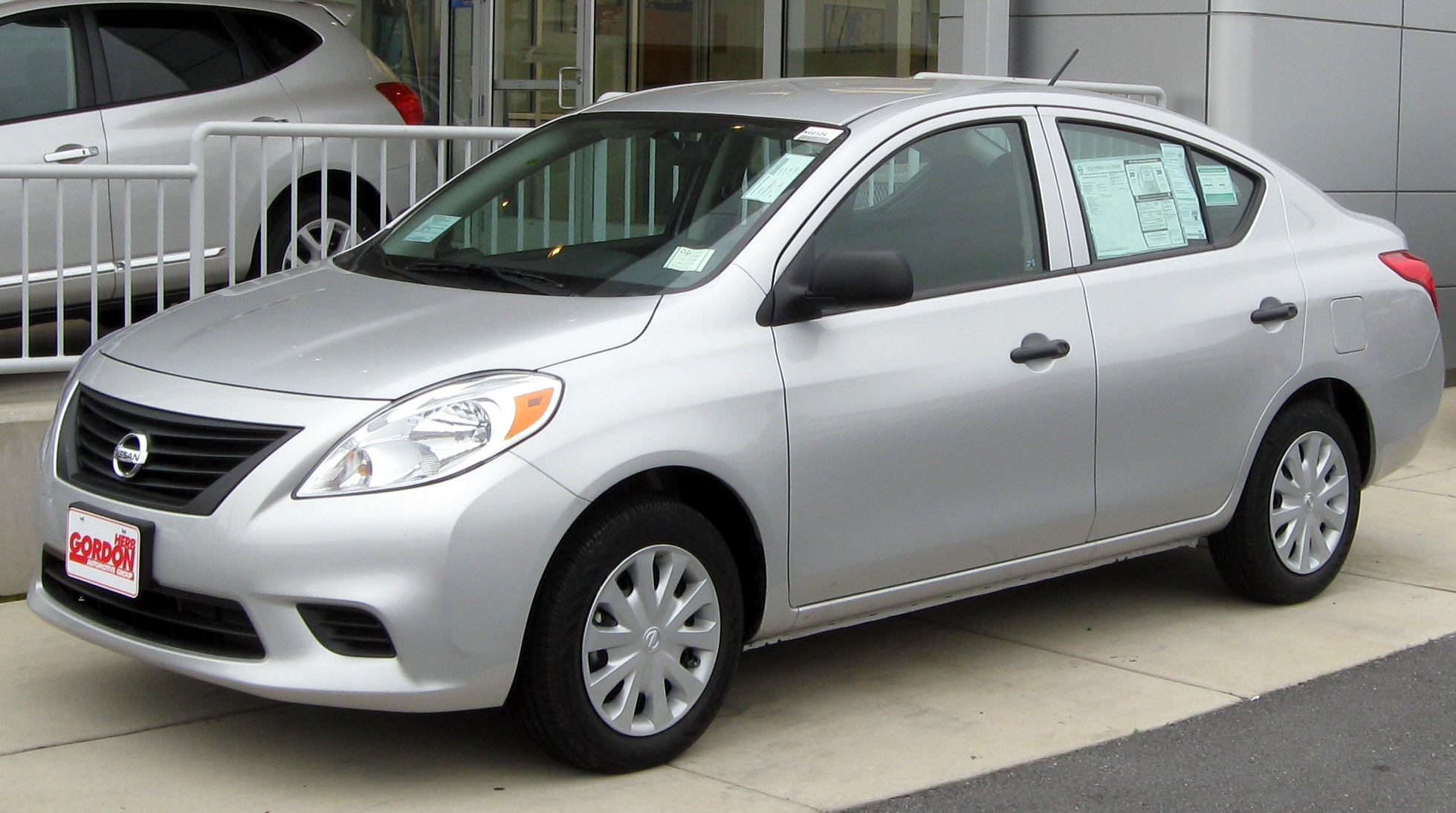
Second-generation Versa sedan (N17; 2012–2019)

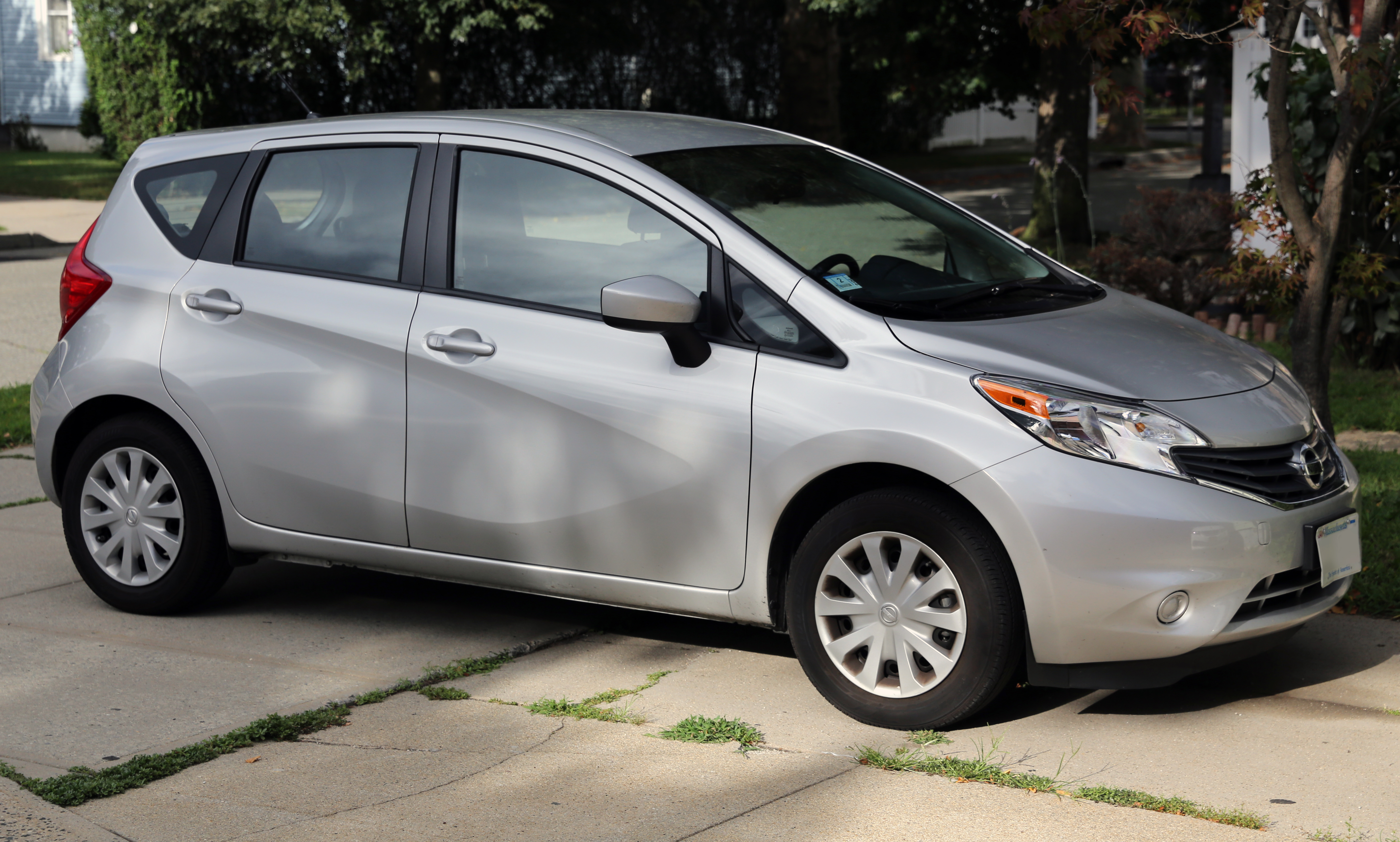
Versa Note (E12; 2013–2019)

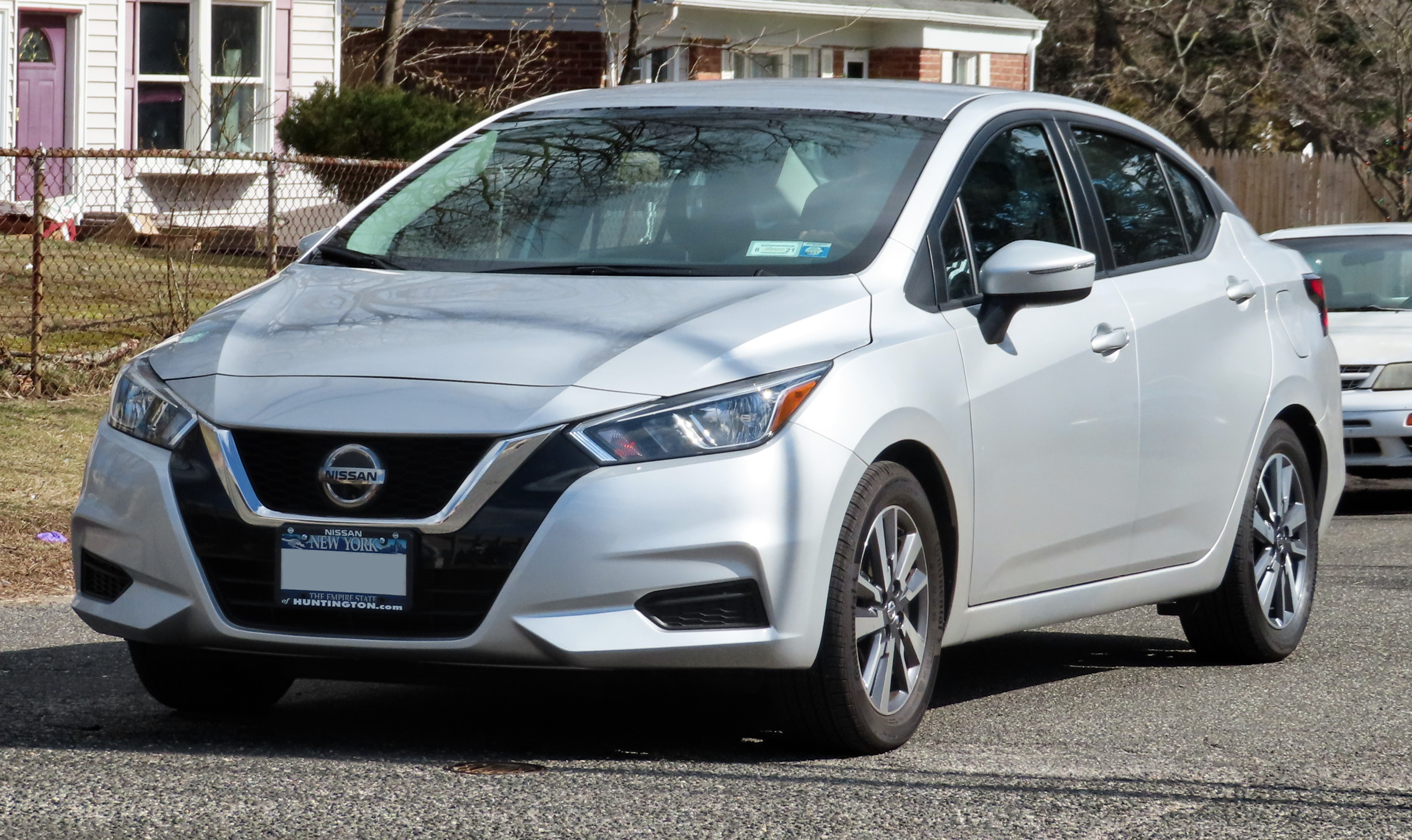
Third-generation Versa sedan (N18; 2019–present)

== Discontinuation in the U.S. market ==
Nissan has discontinued the Versa for the U.S. market after the 2025 model year, with production ending in December 2025. No 2026 model will be available stateside, ending its run as America's cheapest new car under $20,000. Nissan cites its product strategy shift toward higher-margin vehicles like the Sentra and Kicks.

== Sales ==
Calendar year	U.S.	Canada	Mexico	Brazil
2006	22,044	6,727	—N/a	—N/a
2007	79,443	21,940	—N/a	—N/a
2008	85,182	21,845	—N/a	—N/a
2009	82,906	20,097	—N/a	—N/a
2010	99,705	15,743	—N/a	—N/a
2011	99,730	14,497	20,894	3,218
2012	113,327	12,476	47,506	19,670
2013	117,352	12,297	49,004	20,730
2014	139,781	13,314	53,777	15,400
2015	144,528	9,120	64,454	17,412
2016	132,214	7,720	90,543	21,898
2017	106,772	7,865	93,041	23,370
2018	75,809	6,430	91,320	27,995
2019	66,596	2,369	88,707	21,781
2020	48,273	126	68,013	9,907
2021	60,913	2,897	69,775	11,107
2022	13,396	1,286	48,055	5,637
2023	24,807	1,634	76,926	8,860
2024	42,589	2,710	93,278	11,621
2025	51,310	3,776	90,223	9,264
