= Nissan Juke =

Subcompact crossover SUV

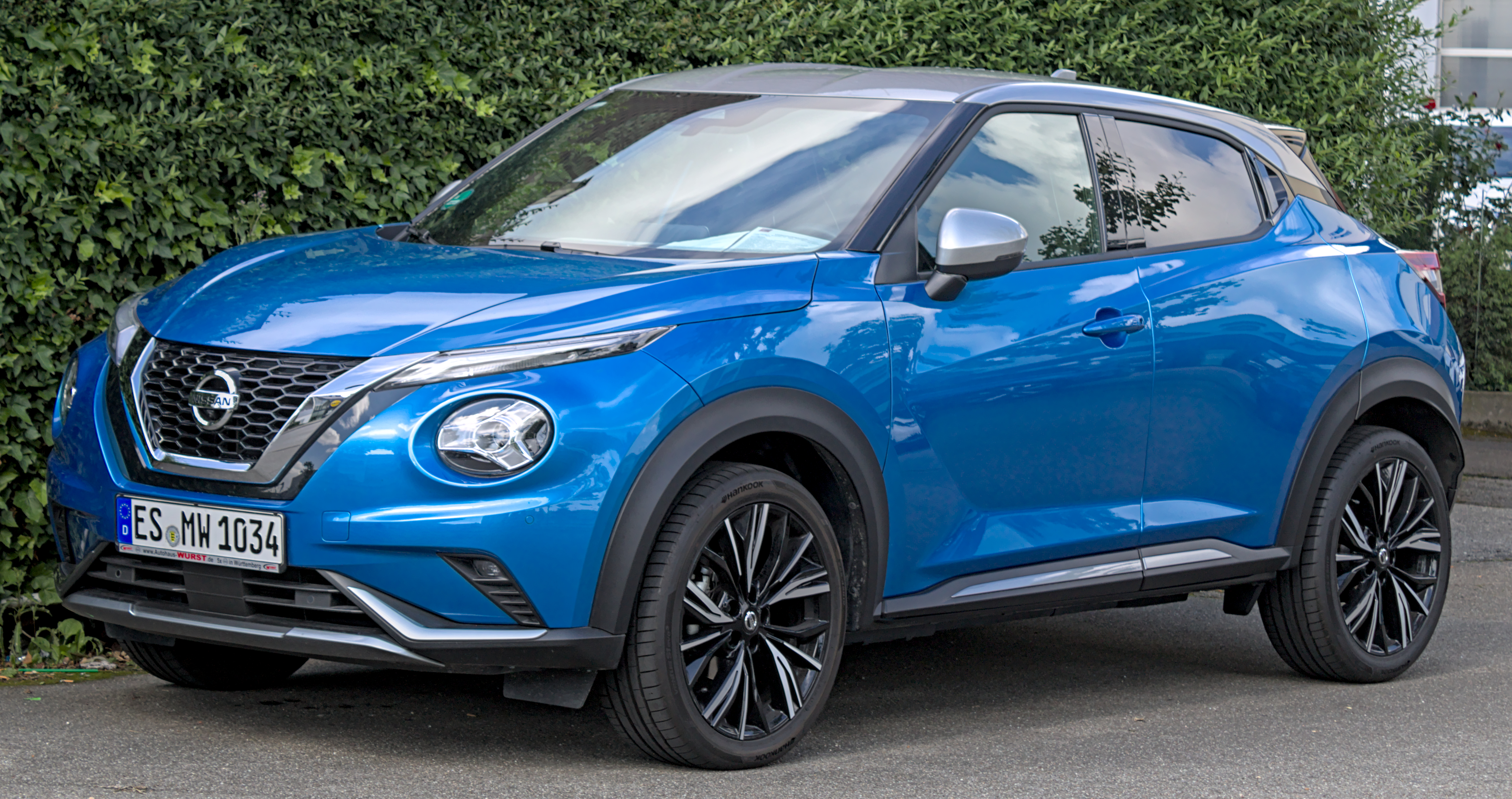
- Nissan Juke (F16)

Overview
- Manufacturer: Nissan
- Production: 2010–present

Body and chassis
- Class: Subcompact crossover SUV (B)
- Body style: 5-door SUV
- Layout: Front-engine, front-wheel-drive Front-engine, all-wheel-drive (2010–2019); Front-motor, front-wheel-drive (2026–present)

The Nissan Juke (Japanese: 日産・ジューク, Hepburn: Nissan Jūku) is a subcompact crossover SUV (B-segment) produced by the Japanese car manufacturer Nissan since 2010. Debuted as a production vehicle at the 2010 Geneva Motor Show in March, it was introduced to North America at the 2010 New York International Auto Show to be sold for the 2011 model year as the smallest crossover in Nissan's lineup prior to the introduction of the Nissan Magnite in 2020.

The second-generation model was revealed for the European market in September 2019, offering larger dimensions by utilising the newer Renault–Nissan CMF-B platform. The second generation marks the withdrawal of the model from most markets outside Europe and Australasia to make way for the Nissan Kicks.

The name juke means to "dance or change directions demonstrating agility", and is also derived from the word jukebox.

== First generation (F15; 2010) ==
First generation
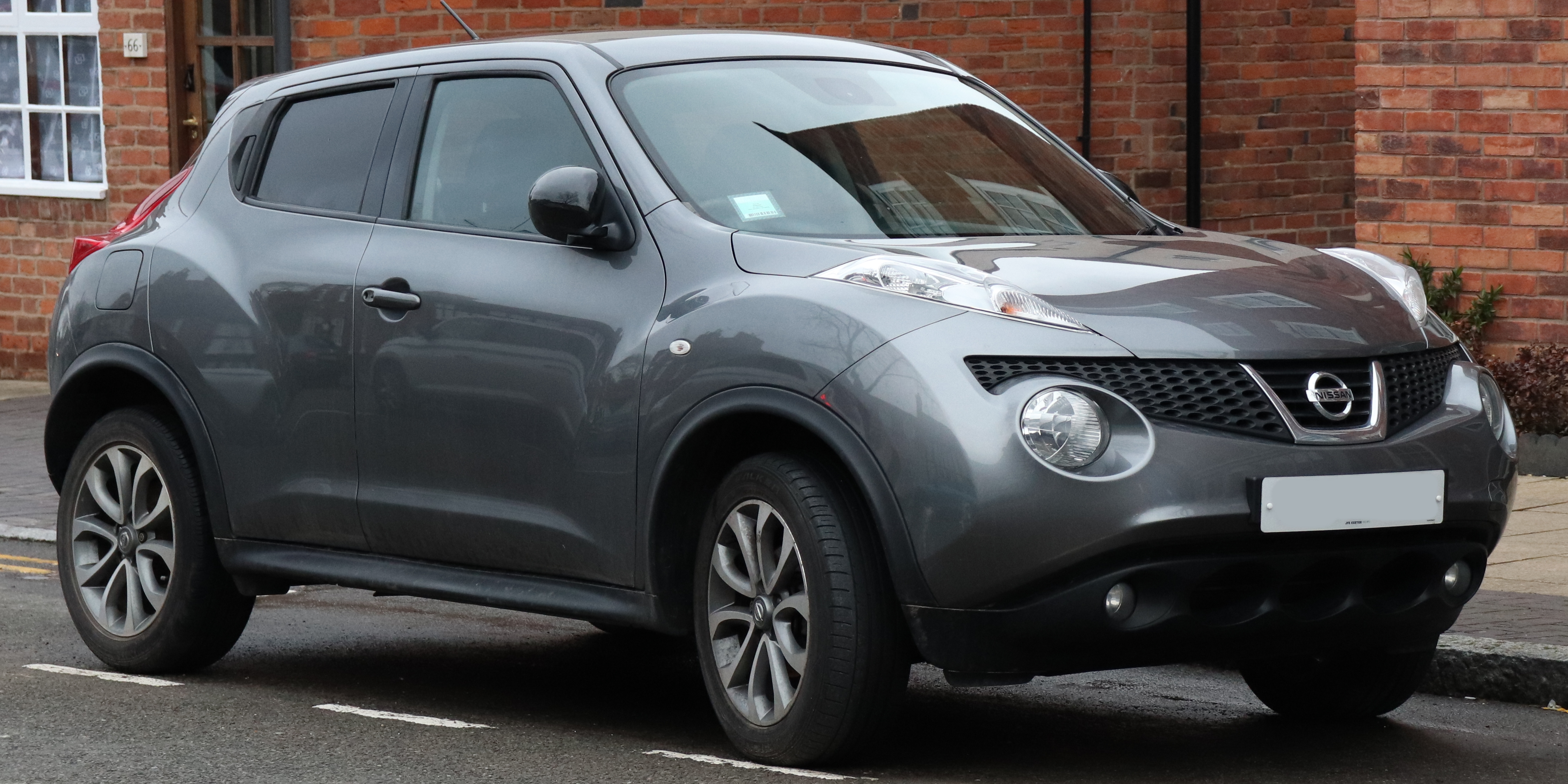

Overview
- Model code: F15
- Also called: Infiniti ESQ (China)
- Production: June 2010 – 2019
- Model years: 2011–2017 (North America)
- Assembly: Japan: Yokosuka, Kanagawa (Oppama Plant); United Kingdom: Sunderland (NMUK); Indonesia: Purwakarta (NMI)
- Designer: Matthew Weaver; Kenji Kawasaki (pre-facelift Juke Nismo)

Body and chassis
- Layout: Front-engine, front-wheel-drive Front-engine, all-wheel-drive
- Platform: Nissan B platform
- Related: Nissan Micra (K13); Nissan Note (E12); Nissan Cube; Renault Captur; Nissan GT-R (for Juke-R only)

Powertrain
- Engine: Petrol: 1.5 L HR15DE I4; 1.6 L HR16DE I4; 1.6 L MR16DDT I4 turbo; 3.8 L VR38DETT V6 twin-turbo (Juke-R); Diesel: 1.5 L Renault K9K I4
- Transmission: 5-speed manual 6-speed manual Xtronic CVT; 6-speed dual-clutch automatic (Juke-R)

Dimensions
- Wheelbase: 2,530 mm (99.6 in)
- Length: 4,125–4,135 mm (162.4–162.8 in)
- Width: 1,765 mm (69.5 in)
- Height: 1,565–1,570 mm (61.6–61.8 in)
- Curb weight: 1,321–1,456 kg (2,912–3,210 lb)

Chronology
- Predecessor: Nissan Dualis (Japan)
- Successor: Nissan Kicks (Americas & Asia)

=== Nissan Qazana concept (2009) ===
On 11 February 2009, Nissan announced that the model would go into production at the Nissan Motor Manufacturing UK (NMUK) plant in Sunderland, United Kingdom, during 2010 following its appearance as the Nissan Qazana concept car at the 2009 Geneva Motor Show.

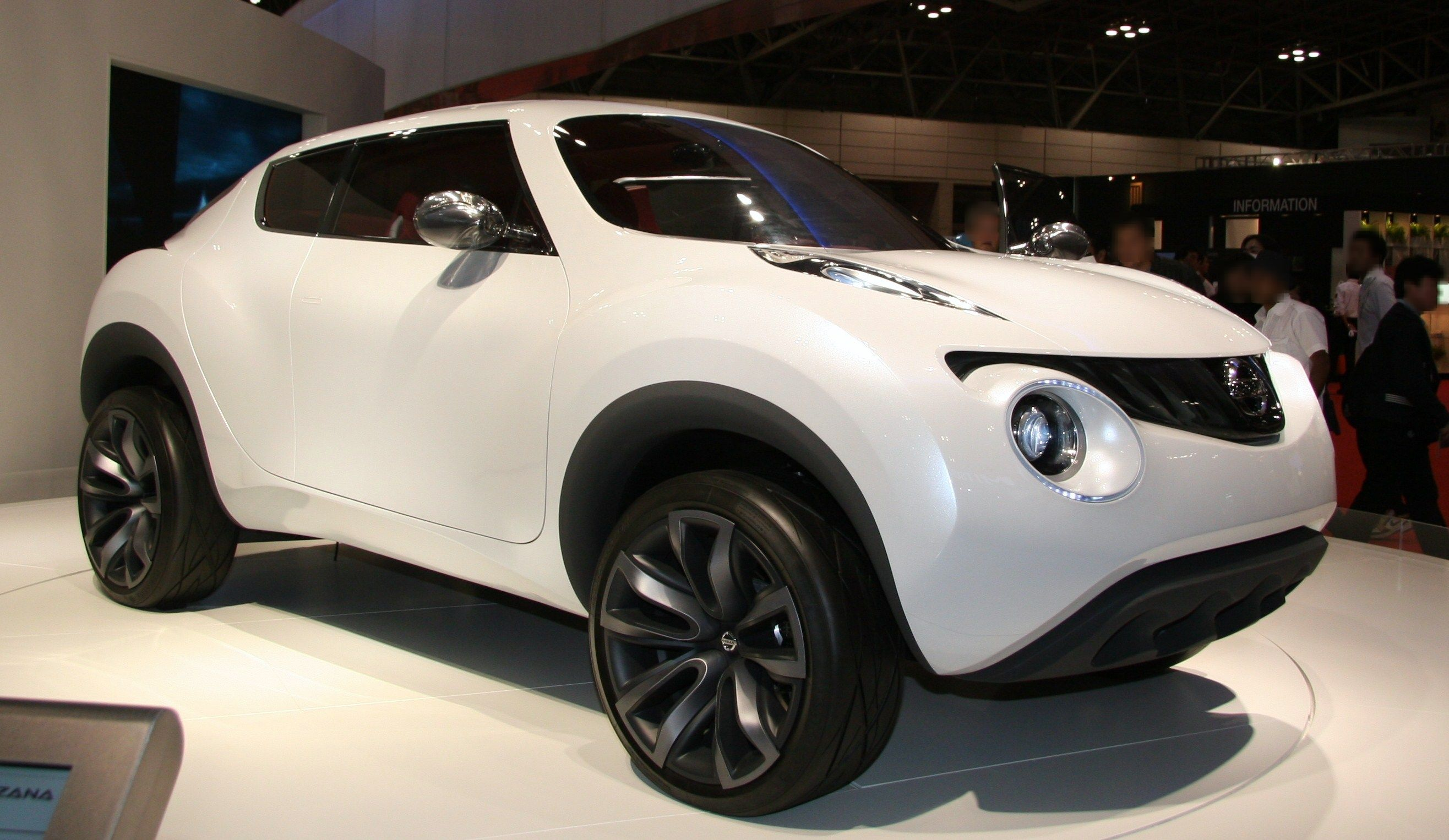
Nissan Qazana concept

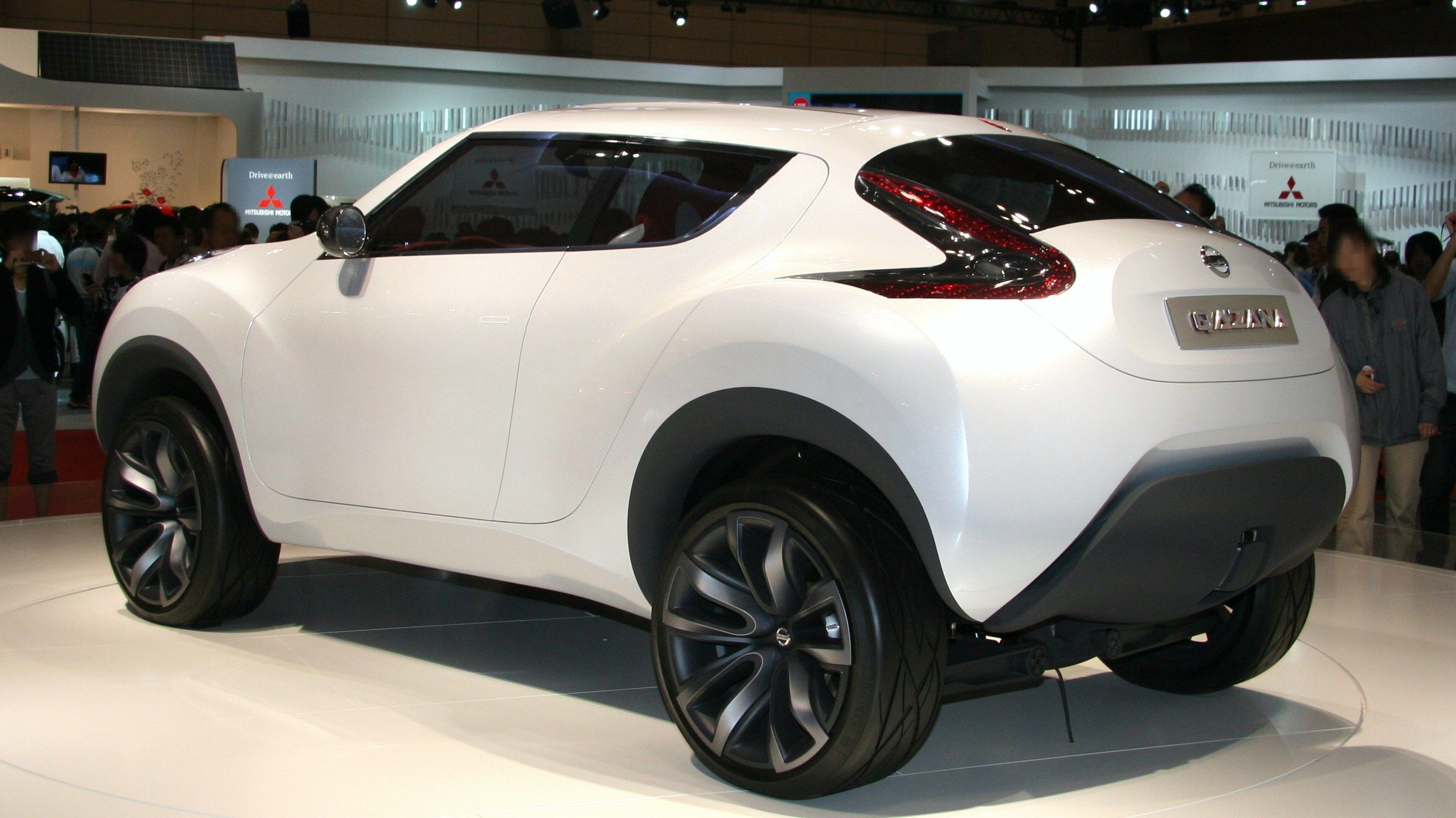
Rear view

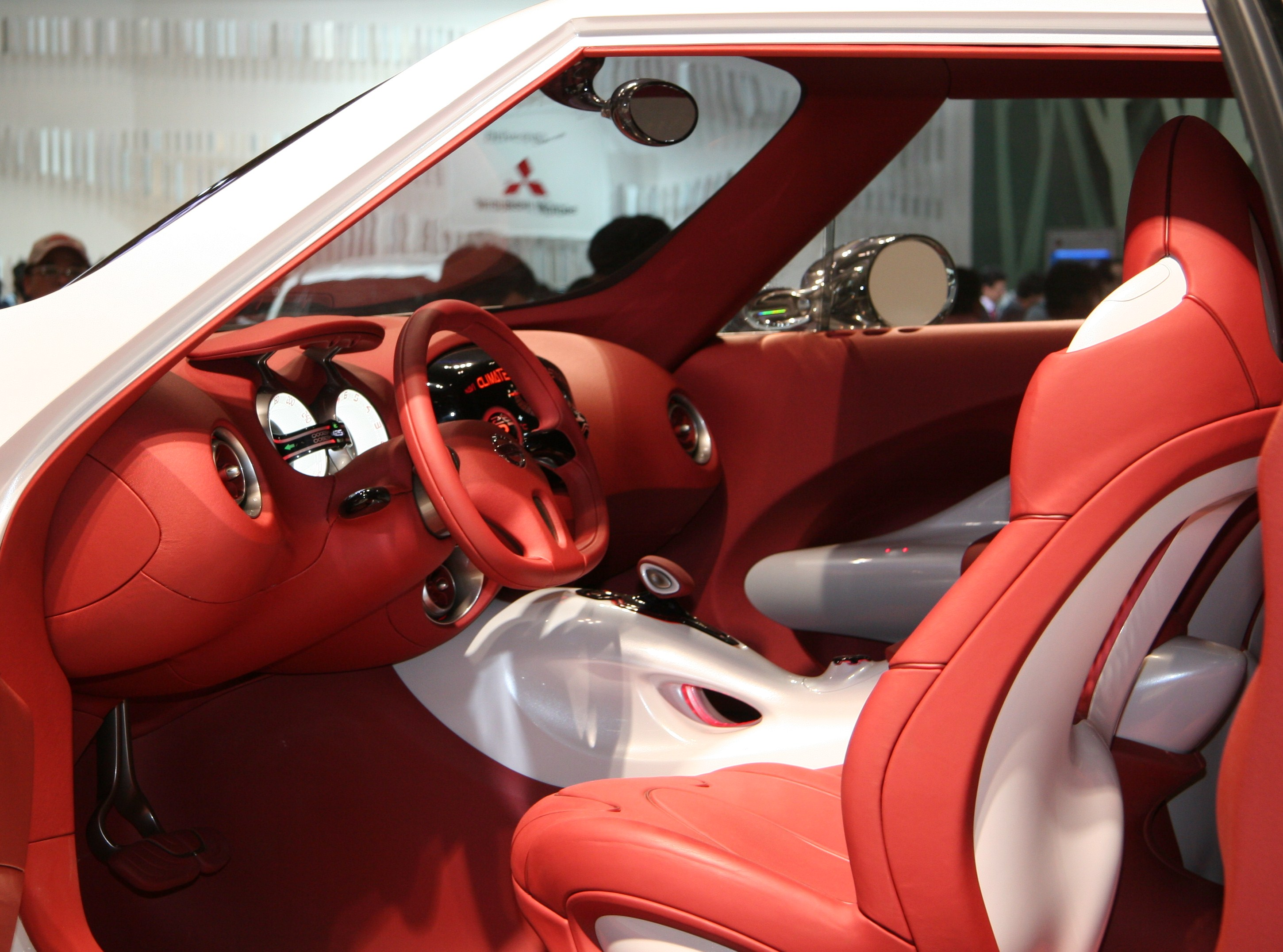
Interior

=== Overview ===
The Juke was designed at Nissan Design Europe in London and refined at Nissan's Design Centre in Japan. It is based on the Nissan B platform. The Sunderland plant (NMUK) manufactures for the European market, Australia and New Zealand, while Nissan's facility in Oppama, Japan, produces the vehicle for all other countries. Both Sunderland and Oppama are suppliers of the all-wheel drive variant. The Purwakarta plant (NMI) in Indonesia assembled the Juke for the domestic market and Thailand with a local content of 40 percent, front-wheel-drive only.

A rebadged version of the first-generation Juke was sold in China as the Infiniti ESQ.

=== Design ===
The car's profile is dominated by the prominent wheel arches and the body's high waistline which contrast with the slim side windows, which is a modern interpretation of "coke bottle styling" popular during the 1960s and 1970s. Echoing a style first seen Nissan's high performance electric coupé concept shown at the 2007 Frankfurt Motor Show, the glasshouse resembles a racing helmet visor. A coupé-like appearance is achieved by the rear door handles being located near the C-pillars, within the window frame. Locating the rear door handles within the window frame is a Nissan styling tradition, begun with the 1985 Nissan Pathfinder. The sport motif continues inside with the red or grey-painted centre console bearing similarity to a motorcycle fuel tank.

The front end features a stacked array of lights. Running lamps and indicators are mounted atop the front wings, their lenses visible from inside the cabin as an aid to maneuvering. Below them, under the lower edges of an expansive, curved grille, the main headlamps are intended to be reminiscent of those fitted to rally cars during the 1960s and 1970s. Where fitted, fog lamps are situated on a third level within the sump guard at the bottom.

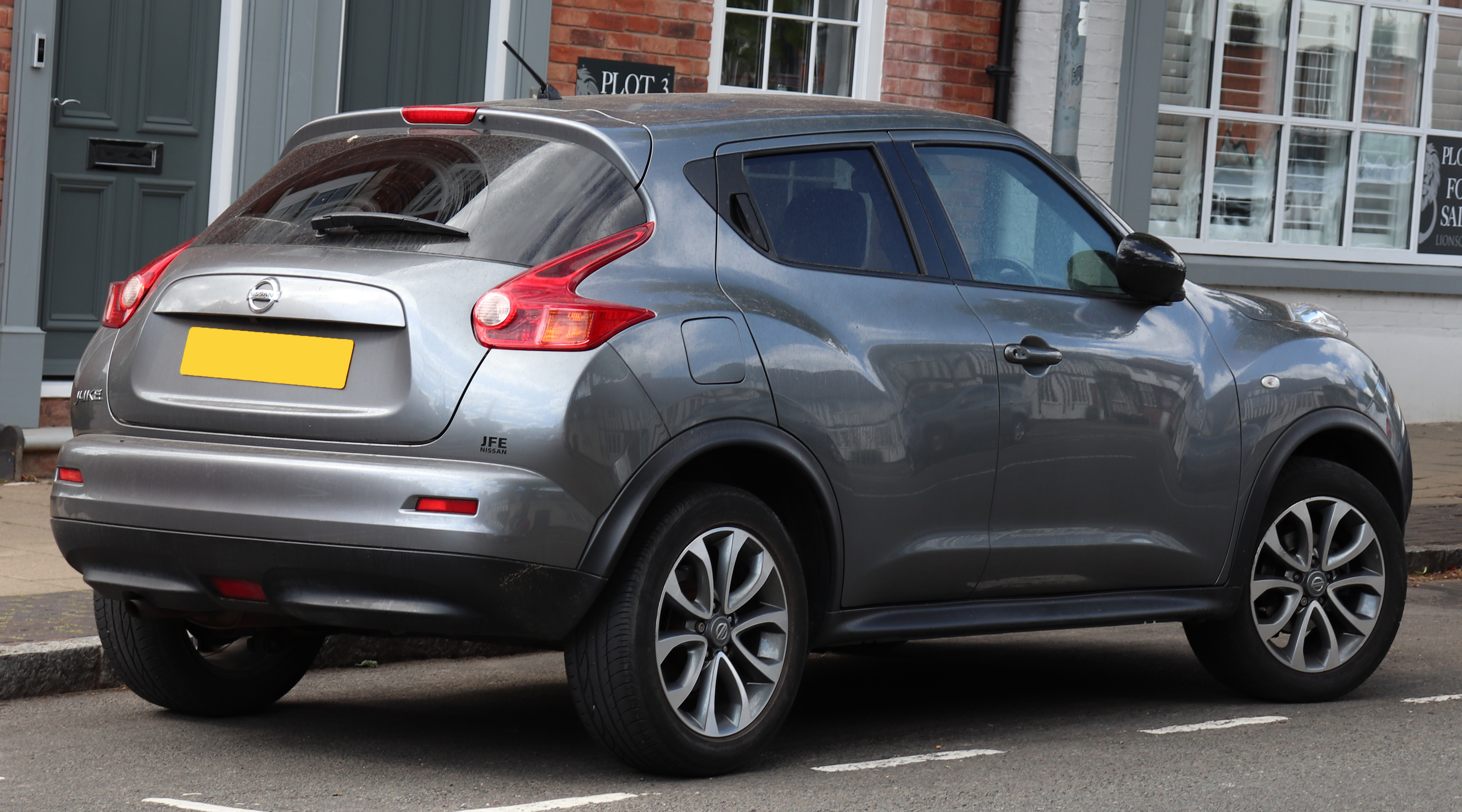
2013 Nissan Juke Tekna 1.6 (rear view)

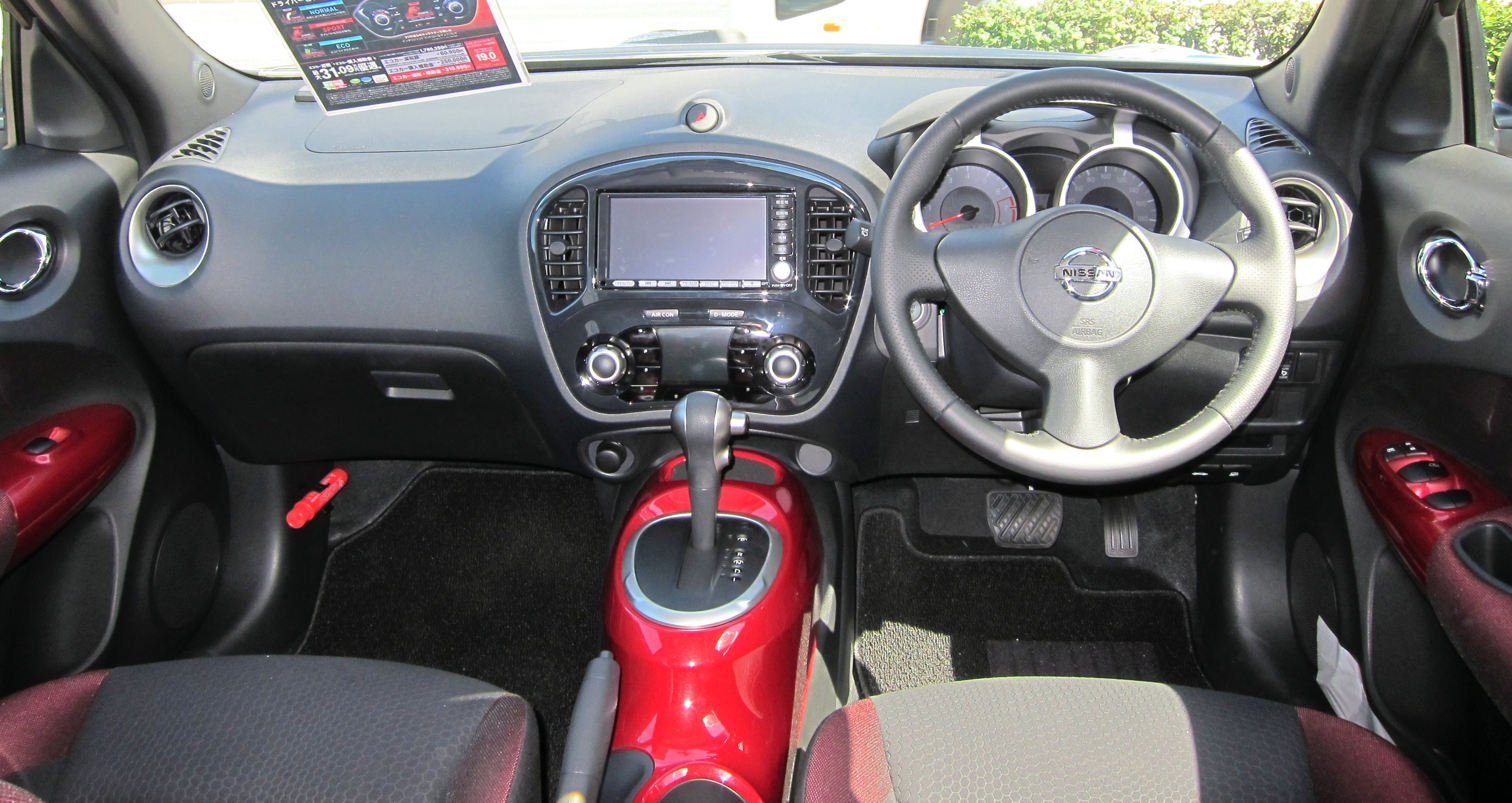
Interior

=== Cabin ===
The Juke features seating for five (two in front, three in back). The rear seats have a 60/40 split and can be folded down independently in order to carry larger objects. The rear cargo area is small but features additional storage beneath the floor (front wheel drive models only).

The steering column instrumentation cluster features a tachometer, speedometer, and a small display between them that displays real-time fuel efficiency, odometer and trip odometer.

The centre portion of the dashboard contains the radio and the I-CON control (if equipped). Depending on market and trim level the Juke may be equipped with iPod or USB connectivity, NissanConnect GPS navigation, rear-view camera and Bluetooth audio. A relatively deep glovebox on the passenger side houses an iPod connector (if equipped).

All but base models are equipped with Nissan's Integrated Control System, dubbed I-CON: a command module that sits in the lower dashboard, which manages both the climate control and the vehicle's drive mode (Normal, Sport or Eco). Its display and nomenclature change according to the function selected. Among the available display data are fuel efficiency stats, real-time G-force measurements and turbo boost pressure.

=== Markets ===
==== Japan ====
In Japan, where the car was launched on 9 June 2010, orders totalled 10,943 units in its first month, surpassing Nissan's monthly target of 1,300. By 5 October 2010, Japanese sales had increased to 20,000 while European and US figures also exceeded expectations with orders for 30,000 and 17,500 cars taken for the respective markets. Four levels are specified. The RX and RS models are equipped with the HR15DE I4 engine, while the MR16DDT was supplied for the 16GT and 16GT FOUR.

==== United States and Canada ====
Three trim levels were initially available in the US with the 1.6-litre turbocharged MR16DDT petrol engine: S, SV and SL. The base engine is rated at 188 hp (140 kW) at 5,600 rpm and 177 lb⋅ft (240 N⋅m) of torque at 2,000 rpm. The base S model was available only with a CVT and lacks the I-CON display. The SV model adds I-CON, optional 6-speed manual transmission and moonroof. The SL model adds leather seats, USB connectivity and a rear-view camera. All-wheel drive with torque vectoring was optional on all trims but cannot be paired with a manual transmission.

With sales continually dipping after 2014, the Juke was discontinued in the United States and in Canada after the 2017 model.

==== Europe ====
The car was launched in the UK, where it was manufactured, on 24 September 2010.

Five trim levels are indicated for the 1.6-litre HR16DE petrol, 1.5-litre K9K diesel and 1.6-litre MR16DDT petrol engines: Visia, Acenta (also available with Sport and Premium packs), Tekna, Nismo and Nismo RS. In 2012, Nissan replaced the limited edition Juke Kuro with the Juke Shiro model. The Shiro was a limited edition Juke with white accents throughout the interior including white stitching on the leather seats, gear shifter and steering wheel as well as several other aesthetic options.

==== Indonesia ====
Locally assembled by Nissan Motor Indonesia (NMI), the Juke for the Indonesian market comes with two trim levels: RX and Red, with one engine option, the 1.5-litre HR15DE inline-four. Both trims are only available with a CVT. The Red model, only available in Indonesia, adds roof spoiler, different grille colour and bigger audio display screen. On 12 February 2015, Nissan Motor Indonesia added "Revolt" trim to the lineup, while introducing facelift for Indonesian Juke. Between 2014 and 2017, the locally assembled Juke was exported to Thailand. Production ceased in September 2018.

=== Facelift ===
At the 2014 Geneva Motor Show, Nissan unveiled the revised Nissan Juke for 2015 model year, which went on sale in the summer of 2014. On the exterior, the revision has new L-Shaped LED Daytime Running and Indicator clusters, new front and rear bumper styling and new colour options. New standard equipment includes a rear-view camera, keyless entry and Bluetooth hands-free phone system.

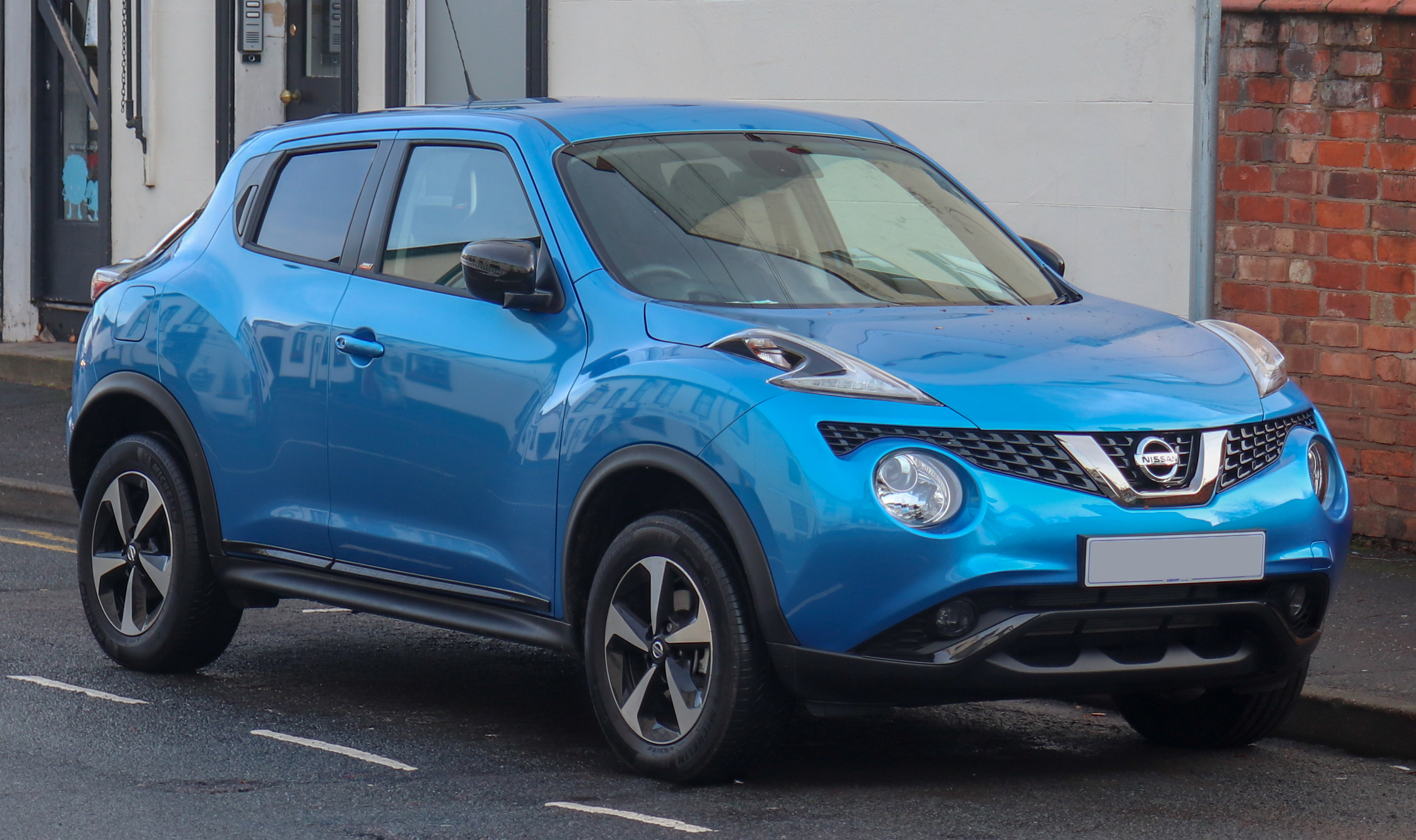
2018 Nissan Juke (UK; facelift)

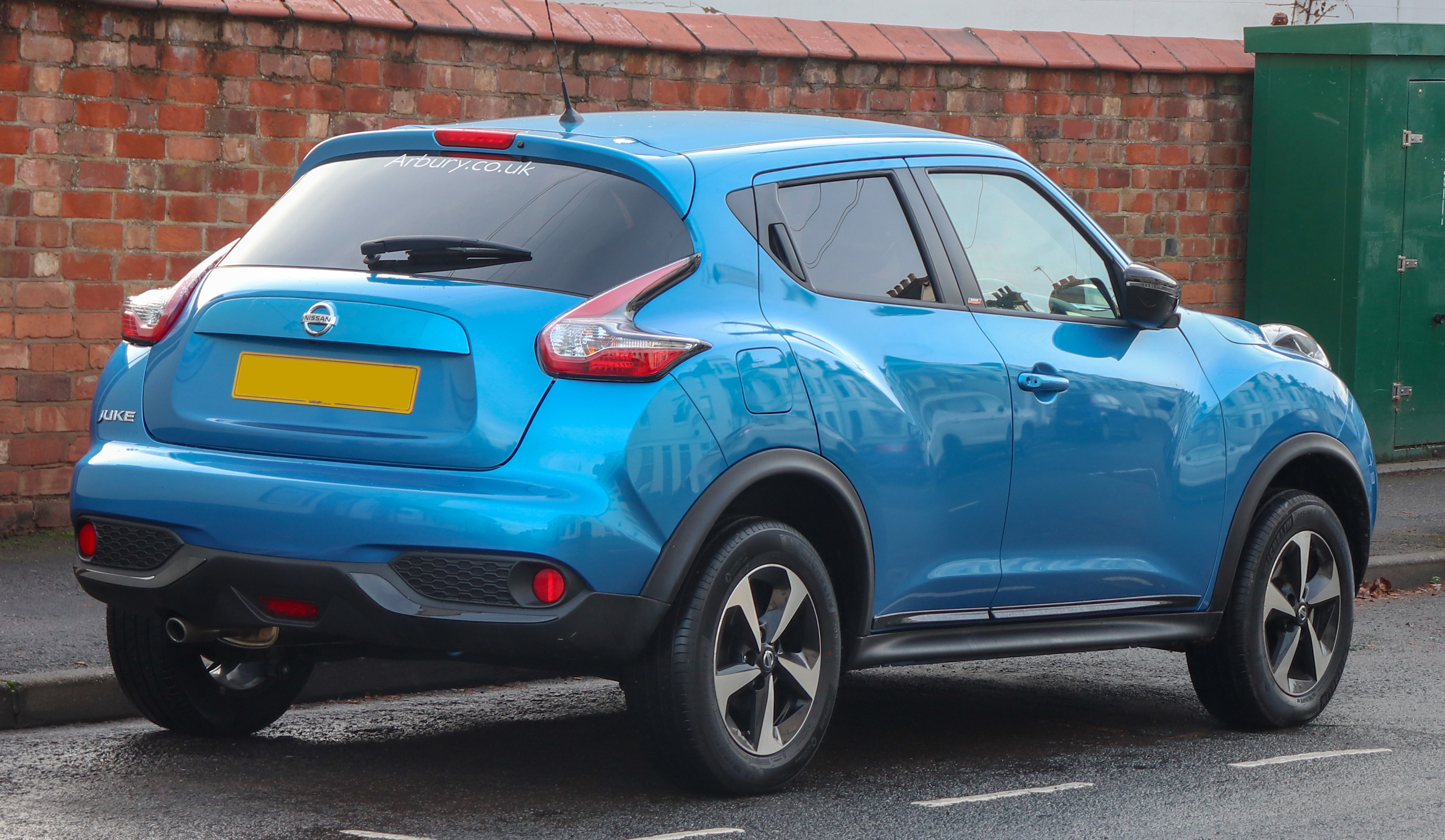
2018 Nissan Juke (UK; facelift)

=== Juke Nismo ===
New for 2013, the NISMO version differs from the base Juke in styling changes to the bumpers and side skirts, interior styling, modified suspension and steering, 18 in (46 cm) wheels, an unspecified "torque vectoring" option, and engine tuning. The engine is rated at 197 hp (147 kW) at 6,000 rpm and 184 lb⋅ft (249 N⋅m) of torque at 2,000 rpm. There was also a higher-end Nismo RS variant available, with upgraded standard equipment (Recaro front seats, carbon fibre). The engine is upgraded to 215 hp (160 kW) at 6,300 rpm and 210 lb⋅ft (285 N⋅m) at 3,600 rpm.

The New York Times review was generally positive, but: "About that styling: I love it, but you might hate it. The face is dominated by bug-eye headlamps, and the running lights bulge up above the hood such that they’re in the driver’s line of sight. At night, the effect is of large bio-luminescent slugs lounging atop the front fenders. Admittedly, it’s more appealing than I’m making it sound."

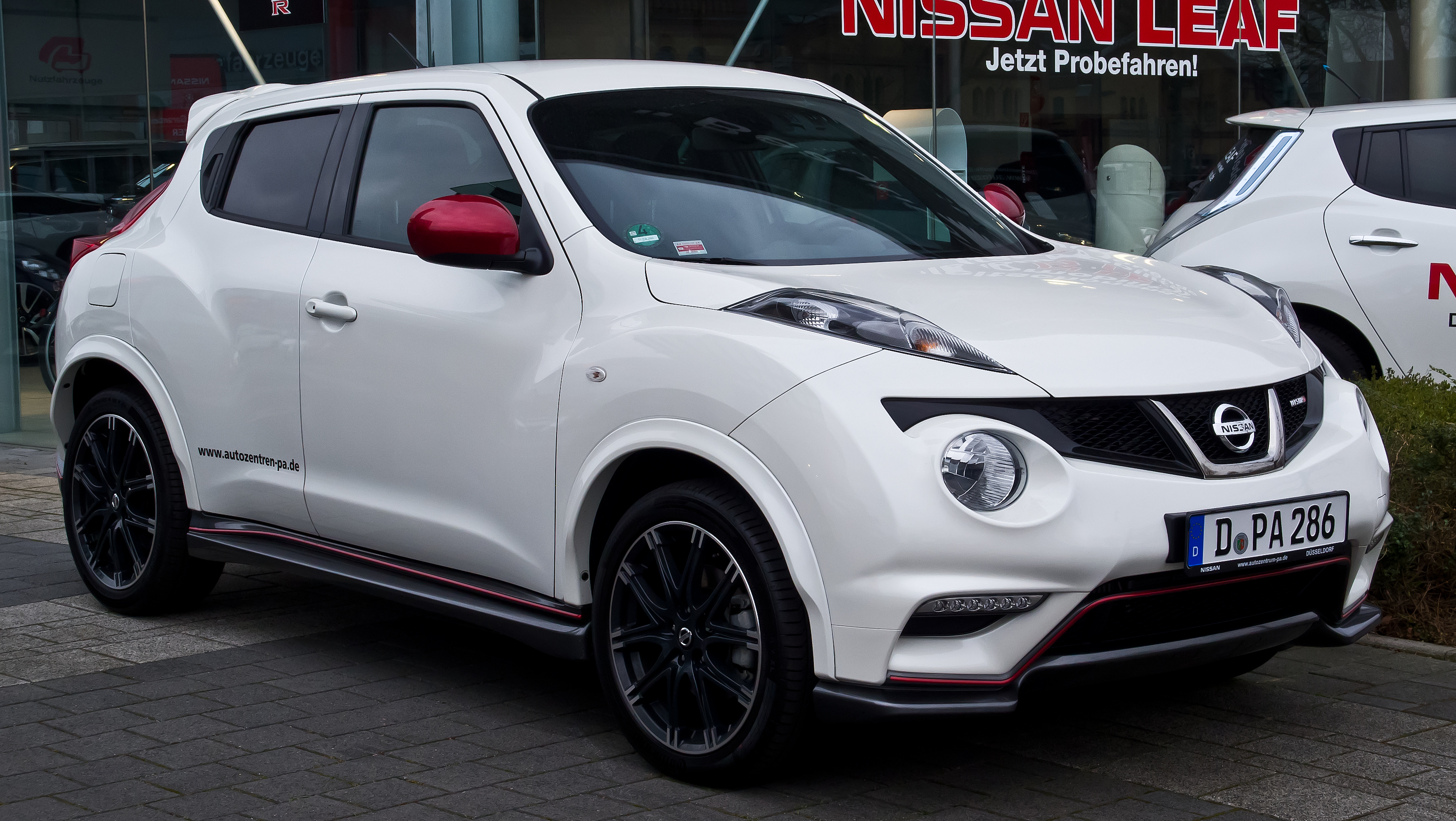
Nissan Juke 1.6 DIG-T Nismo (pre-facelift)

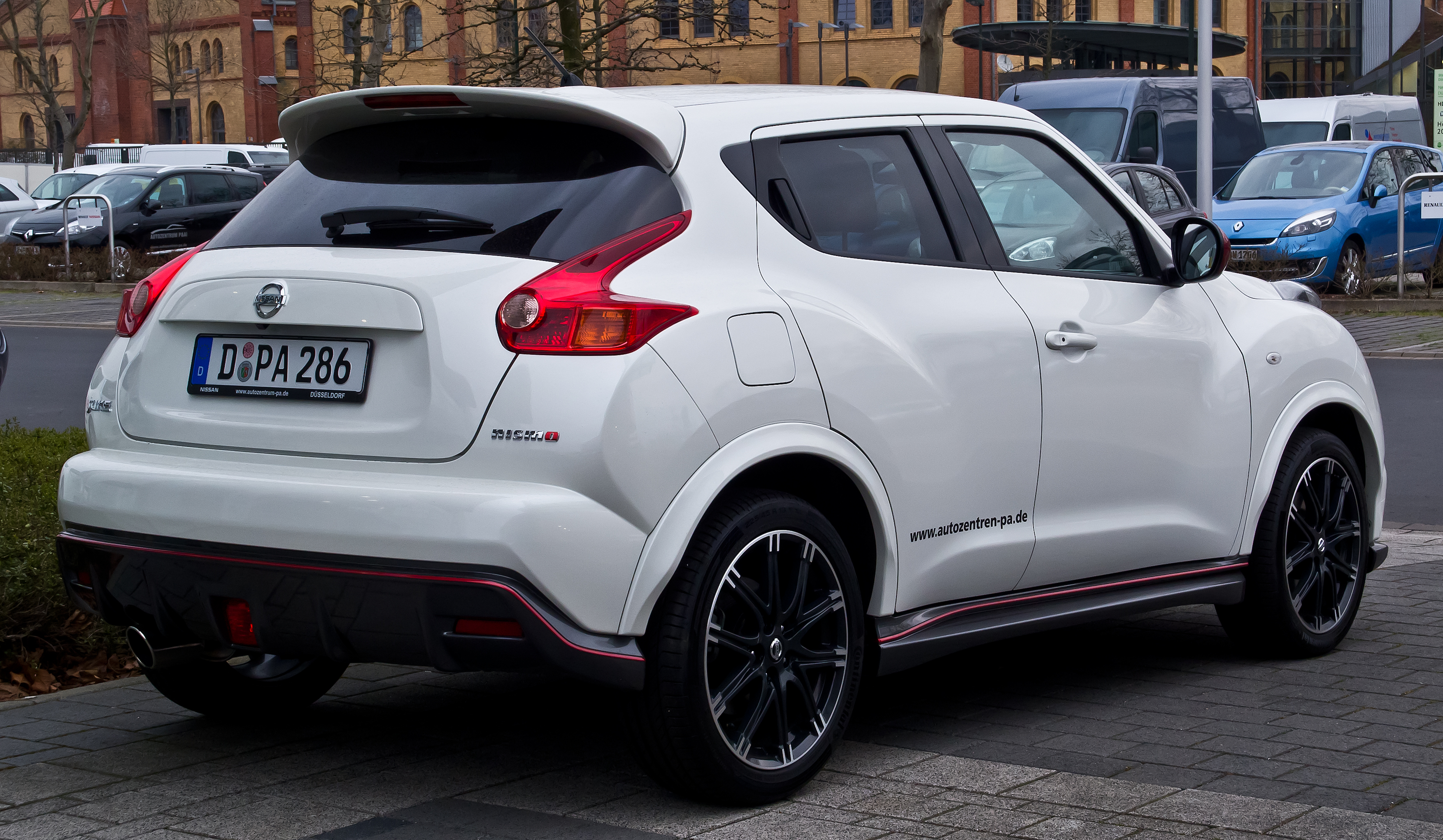
Nissan Juke 1.6 DIG-T Nismo (pre-facelift)

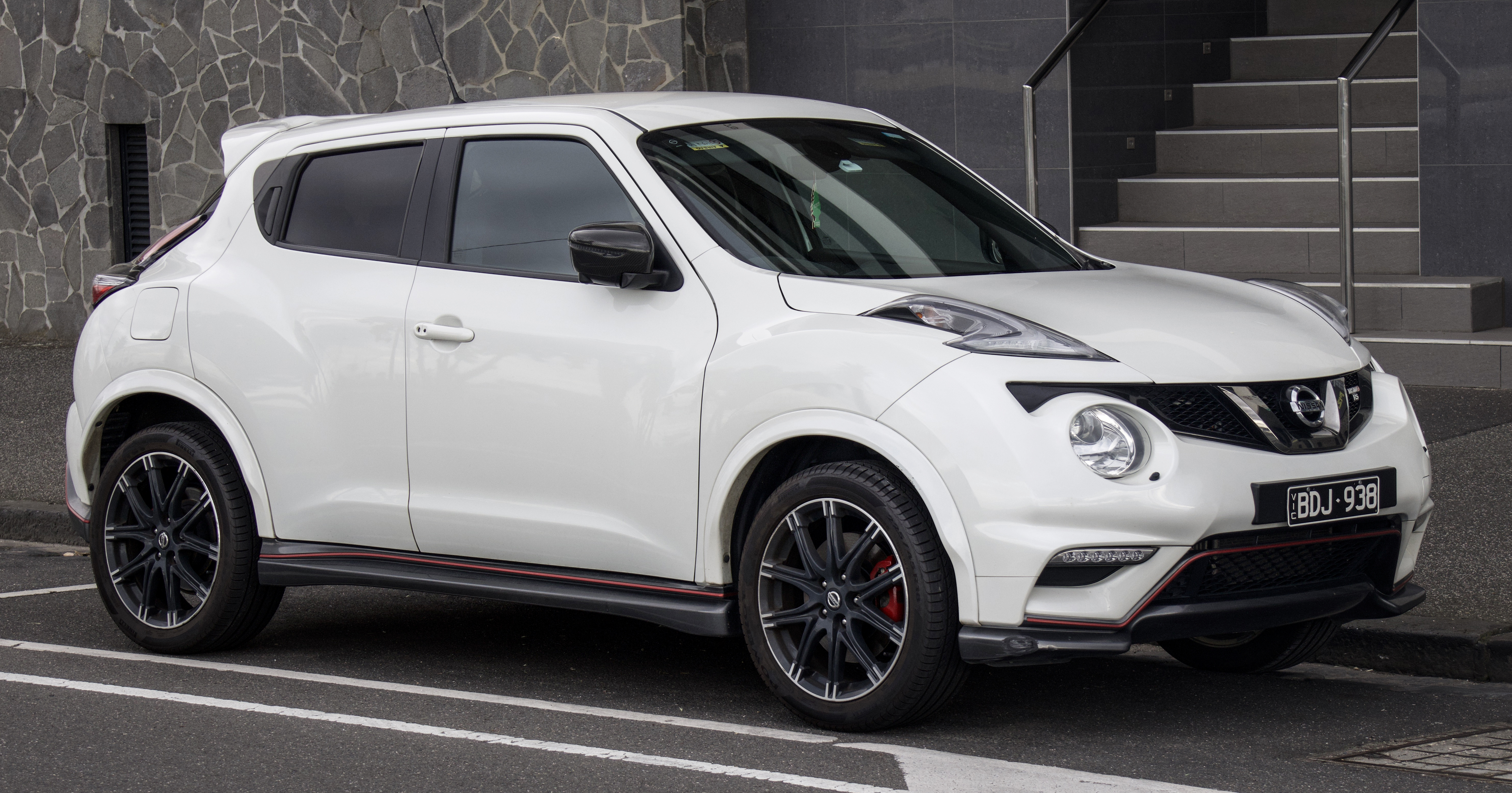
2018 Nissan Juke Nismo RS (facelift)

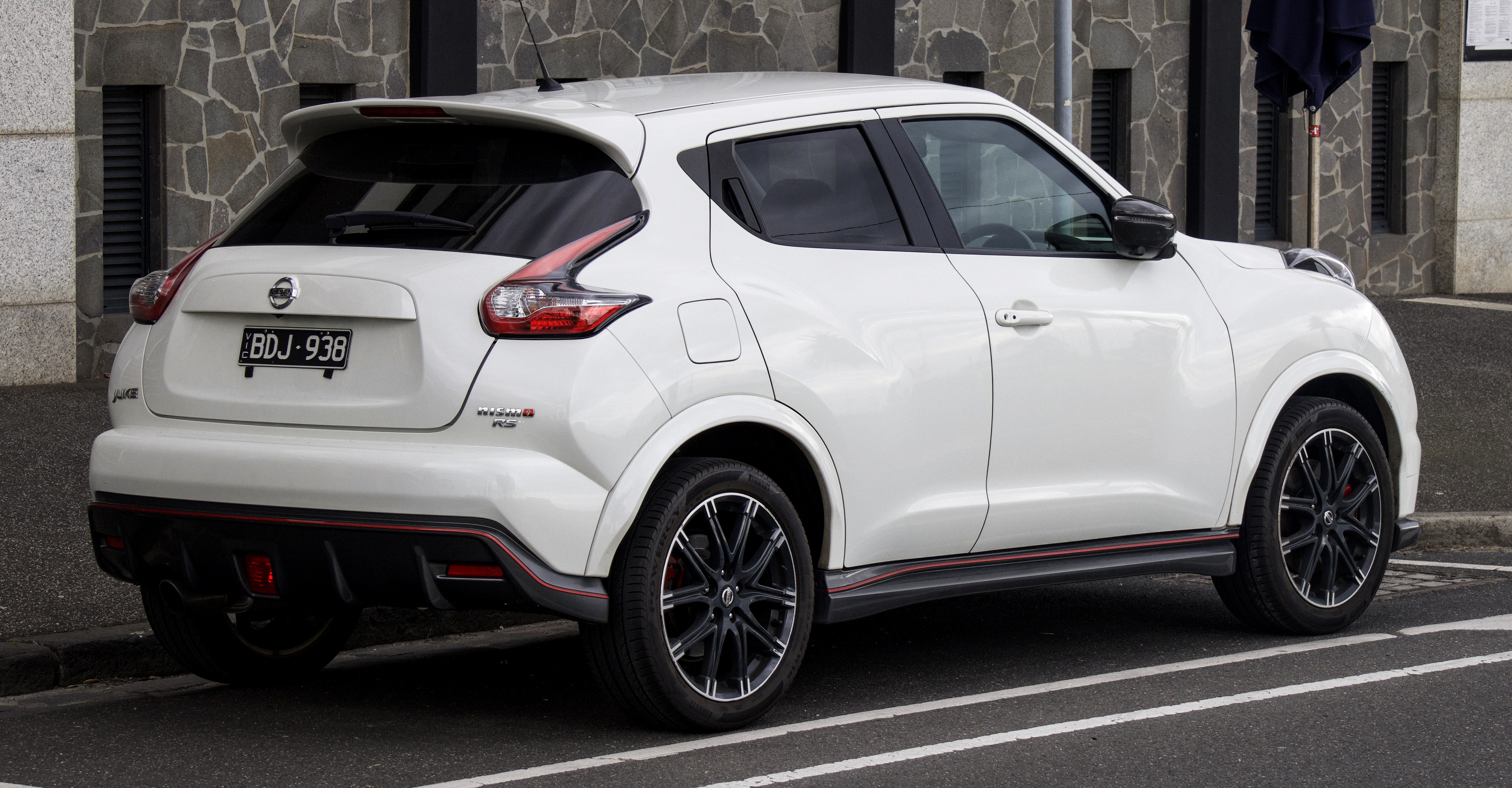
2018 Nissan Juke Nismo RS (facelift)

=== Juke-R ===
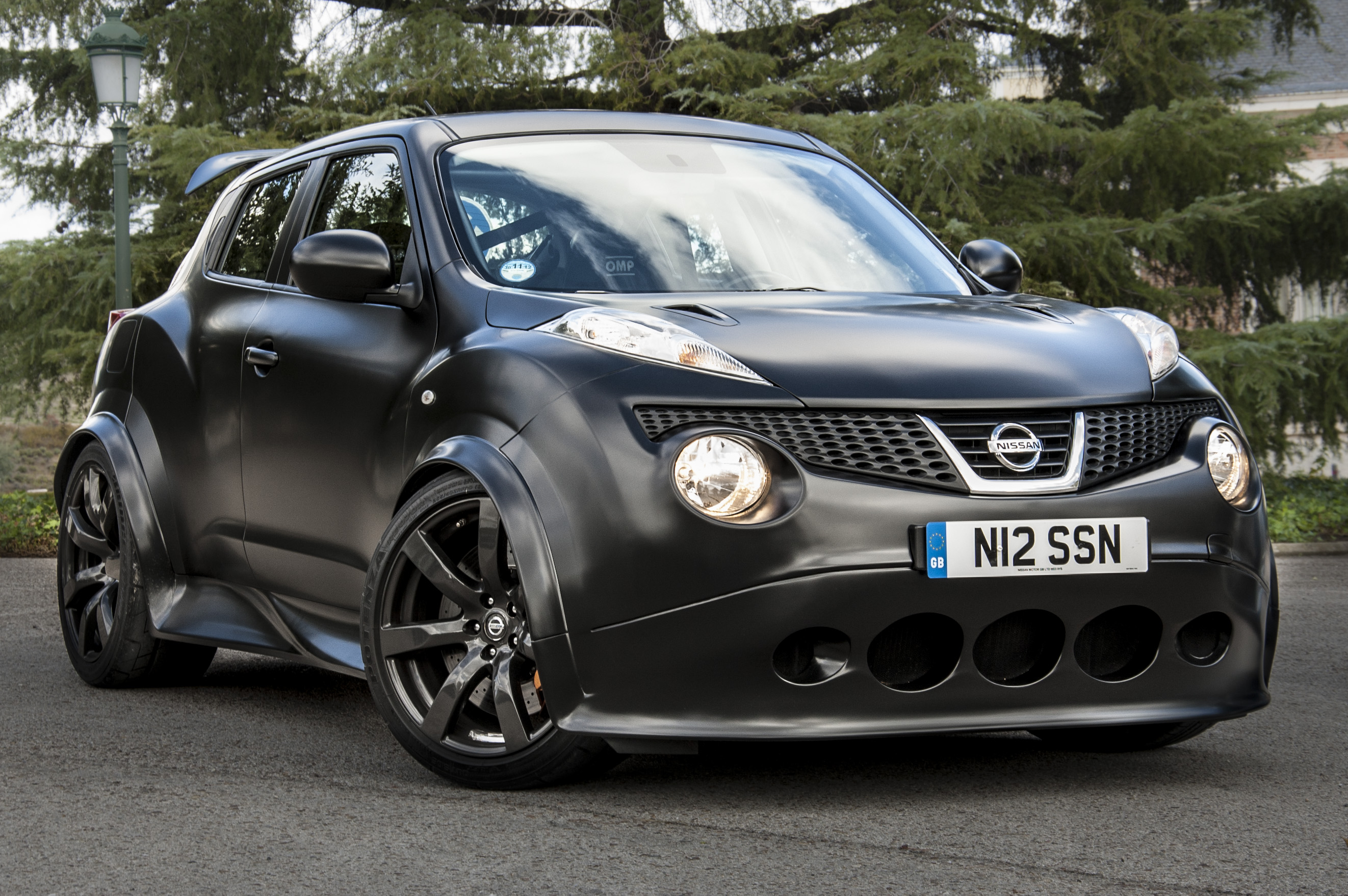
Juke-R Prototype

The Juke-R is a limited production run Juke with the drivetrain, chassis, and the 3.8-litre VR engine from the Nissan GT-R that produces 545 hp (406 kW). The car was developed after hours by a group of Nissan engineers and motorsport engineering company RML Group (a Nissan partner); the production was handled by tuners Severn Valley Motorsport. Although Nissan planned to produce 17 or 23 units, only a total of two Juke-Rs were produced; one right-hand-drive, and one left-hand-drive.

=== Infiniti ESQ ===
Beginning in 2014, the Juke has been sold in China as the Infiniti ESQ. Debuted at 2014 Chengdu Auto Show, it is based on the pre-facelift Juke Nismo with its upgraded suspension, aero enhancements and 18-inch wheels. It uses the turbocharged 1.6-litre four-cylinder engine with 147 kW (200 PS; 197 hp).

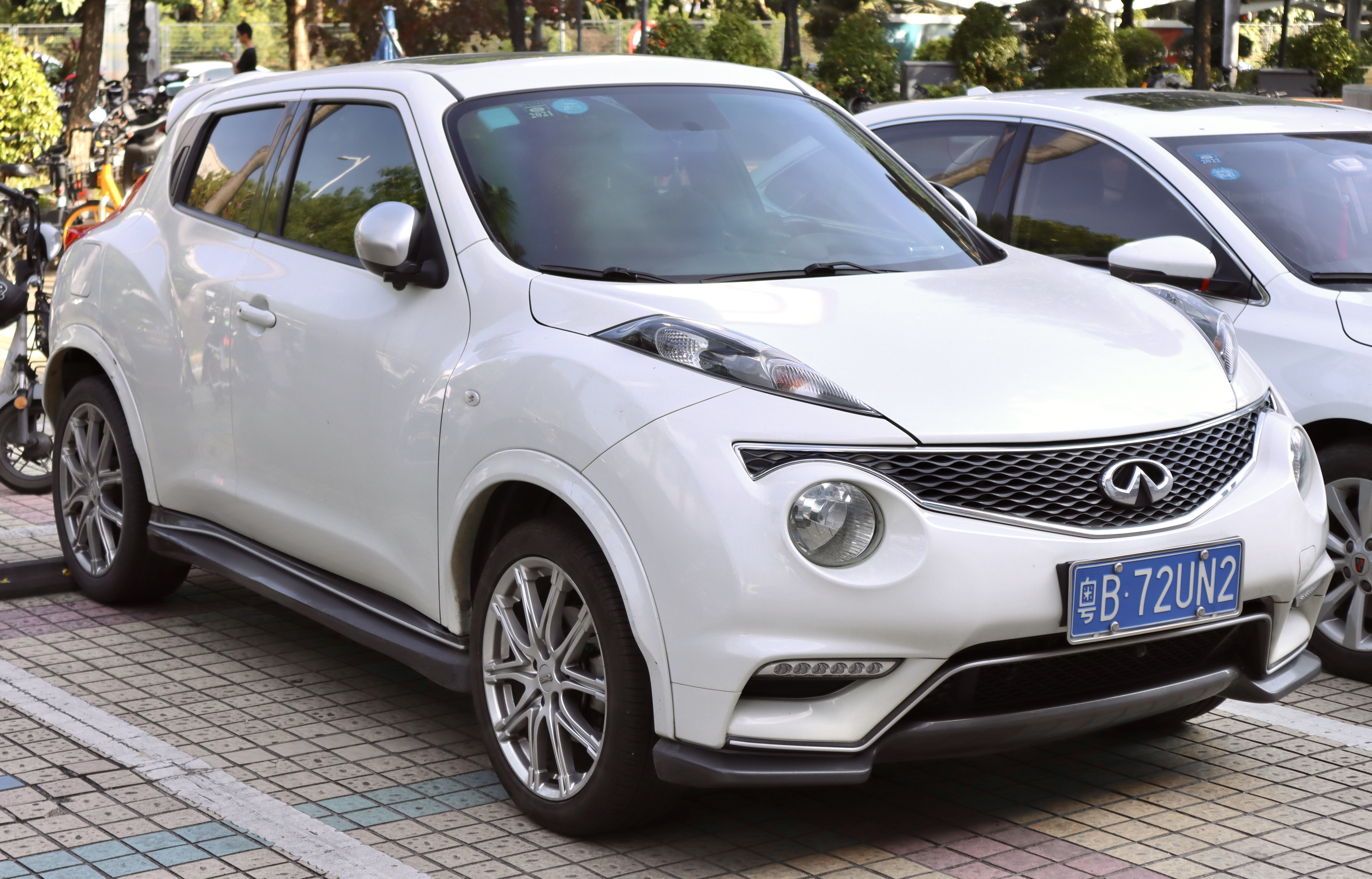
2014 Infiniti ESQ

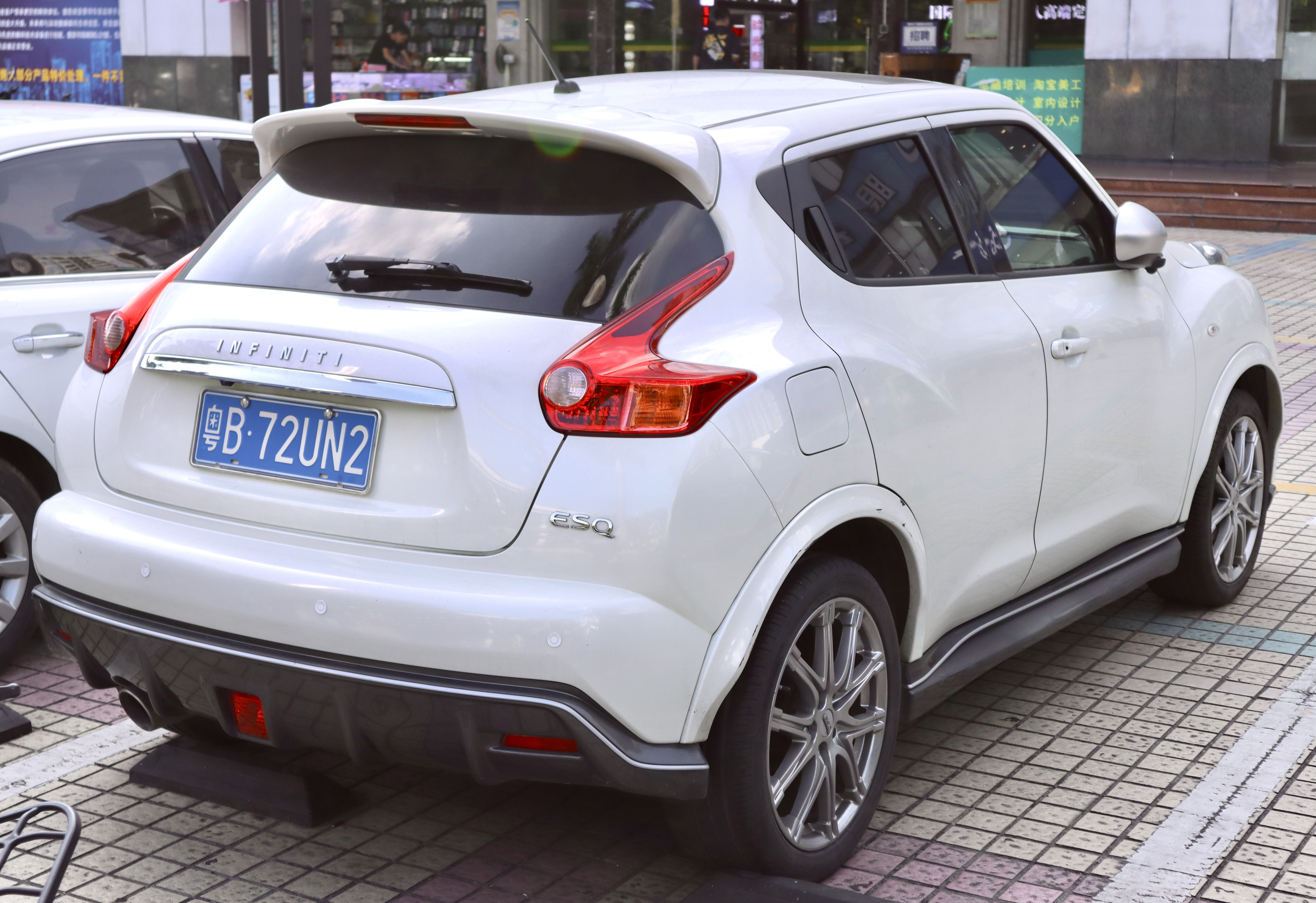
2014 Infiniti ESQ

=== Specifications ===
	1.6	1.6	1.6 DIG-T	1.6 DIG-T (Nismo)	1.5 dCi DPF
In Production Since	02/2013	10/2010	10/2010	03/2013	10/2010
Engine Type	Inline-4		Inline-4, Turbocharged		Inline-4 Turbodiesel, Common rail
Displacement	1598 cc		1618 cc		1461 cc
Power	69 kW (94 PS; 93 hp) @ 5400 rpm	86 kW (117 PS; 115 hp) @ 6000 rpm	140 kW (190 PS; 188 hp) @ 5600 rpm	147 kW (200 PS; 197 hp) @ 6000 rpm	81 kW (110 PS; 109 hp) @ 4000 rpm
Torque	140 N⋅m (103 lbf⋅ft) @ 3200-4400 rpm	157 N⋅m (116 lbf⋅ft) @ 4000 rpm	240 N⋅m (177 lbf⋅ft) @ 2000-5600 rpm	250 N⋅m (184 lbf⋅ft) @ 2000-4800 rpm	240 N⋅m (177 lbf⋅ft) @ 1750 rpm
Standard Drivetrain	Front-wheel drive				
Optional Drivetrain	—N/a		All-wheel drive		—N/a
Standard Transmission	5-Speed Manual		6-Speed Manual		
Optional Transmission	—N/a	Xtronic CVT			—N/a
Weight	1,195–1,225 kg (2,635–2,701 lb)	1,215–1,272 kg (2,679–2,804 lb) or 1,217–1,290 kg (2,683–2,844 lb) (Note: with optional CVT)	1,325–1,350 kg (2,921–2,976 lb) or 1,455–1,475 kg (3,208–3,252 lb) (Note: with optional AWD)		1,320–1,360 kg (2,910–3,000 lb)
Maximum Payload	420–450 kg (930–990 lb)	380–458 kg (838–1,010 lb)	385–410 kg (849–904 lb)	385–410 kg (849–904 lb)	390–430 kg (860–950 lb)
0–100 km/h (0–62 mph)	12.0 s	11.1 s 11.5 s	8.2 s 8.8 s	7.8 s 8.2 s	11.2 s
Top Speed	168 km/h (104 mph)	178 km/h (111 mph); 170 km/h (110 mph)	215 km/h (134 mph); 200 km/h (120 mph)		175 km/h (109 mph)
Fuel Consumption (Combined)	6.0 L/100 km (39 mpg_{‑US})	6.0 L/100 km (39 mpg_{‑US}); 6.3 L/100 km (37 mpg_{‑US})	6.9 L/100 km (34 mpg_{‑US}); 7.4 L/100 km (32 mpg_{‑US})		4.8 L/100 km (49 mpg_{‑US})
CO_{2}-Emission, combined	138 g/km	139 g/km 145 g/km	159 g/km 175 g/km	159-169 g/km 175 g/km	124 g/km
Euro Emissions Classification	Euro 5				

=== Safety ===
==== Euro NCAP ====
Euro NCAP test results* Nissan Juke 1.6 Acenta (LHD) (2011)
Test	Points	%
Overall:	5 /5 stars	
Adult occupant:	31.5	87%
Child occupant:	39.7	81%
Pedestrian:	14.7	41%
Safety assist:	5	71%

==== IIHS ====
The 2011 model year Juke received Insurance Institute for Highway Safety (IIHS) Top Safety Pick.

IIHS scores (2011 model year)
Small overlap front (driver)	Poor
Moderate overlap front (original test)	Good
Side impact (original test)	Good
Roof strength	Good
Head restraints and seats	Good

==== ANCAP ====
ANCAP test results* Nissan Juke front-wheel-drive variants with H16 engine (2011)
Test	Score
Overall	5 /5 stars
Frontal offset	13.69/16
Side impact	15.34/16
Pole	2/2
Seat belt reminders	2/3
Whiplash protection	Good
Pedestrian protection	Marginal
Electronic stability control	Standard

=== Marketing ===
In August 2013, Nissan launched a commercial for the Juke, featuring Stormtroopers from the Star Wars franchise

== Second generation (F16; 2019) ==
Second generation
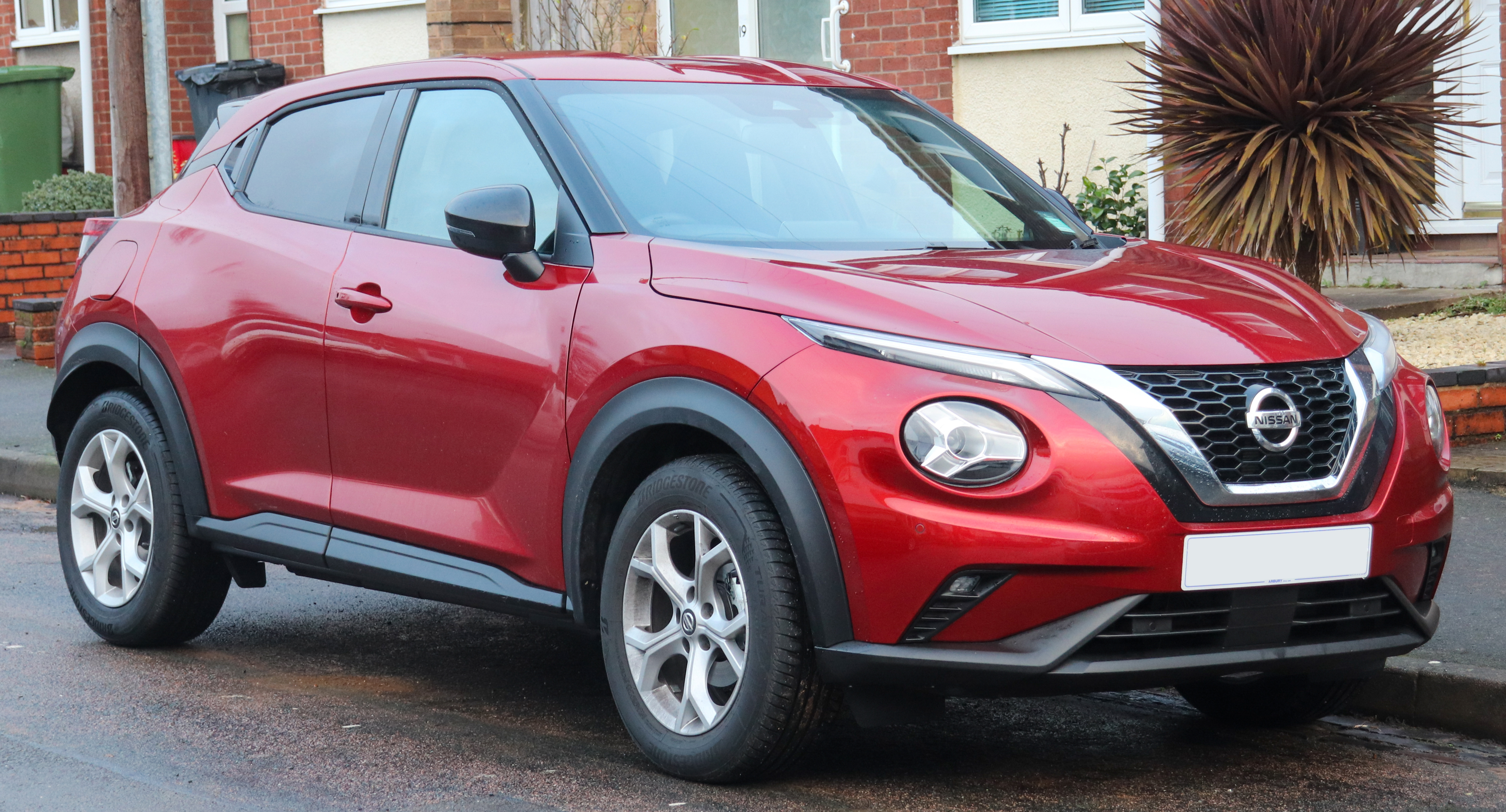

Overview
- Model code: F16
- Production: 2019–present
- Assembly: United Kingdom: Sunderland (NMUK)
- Designer: Koji Wakabayashi, Takashi Utsunomiya and Marten Wallgren

Body and chassis
- Layout: Front-engine, front-wheel-drive
- Platform: Renault–Nissan CMF-B HS platform
- Related: Renault Captur II; Renault Clio V

Powertrain
- Engine: Petrol: 1.0 L HR10DDT DIG-T I3 turbo; Petrol hybrid: 1.6 L HR16DE I4
- Electric motor: Permanent magnet synchronous motor (hybrid)
- Power output: 86 kW (115 hp; 117 PS); 69 kW (93 hp; 94 PS) (hybrid, petrol engine only); 105 kW (141 hp; 143 PS) (hybrid, combined system output)
- Transmission: 6-speed manual 7-speed dual-clutch automatic eCVT
- Hybrid drivetrain: Power-split (hybrid)
- Battery: 1.2 kWh lithium-ion (hybrid)

Dimensions
- Wheelbase: 2,636 mm (103.8 in)
- Length: 4,210 mm (165.7 in)
- Width: 1,800 mm (70.9 in)
- Height: 1,595 mm (62.8 in)

=== Nissan Gripz concept ===
The Nissan Gripz Concept was showcased on 15 September 2015, which was previewed the second-generation Juke.

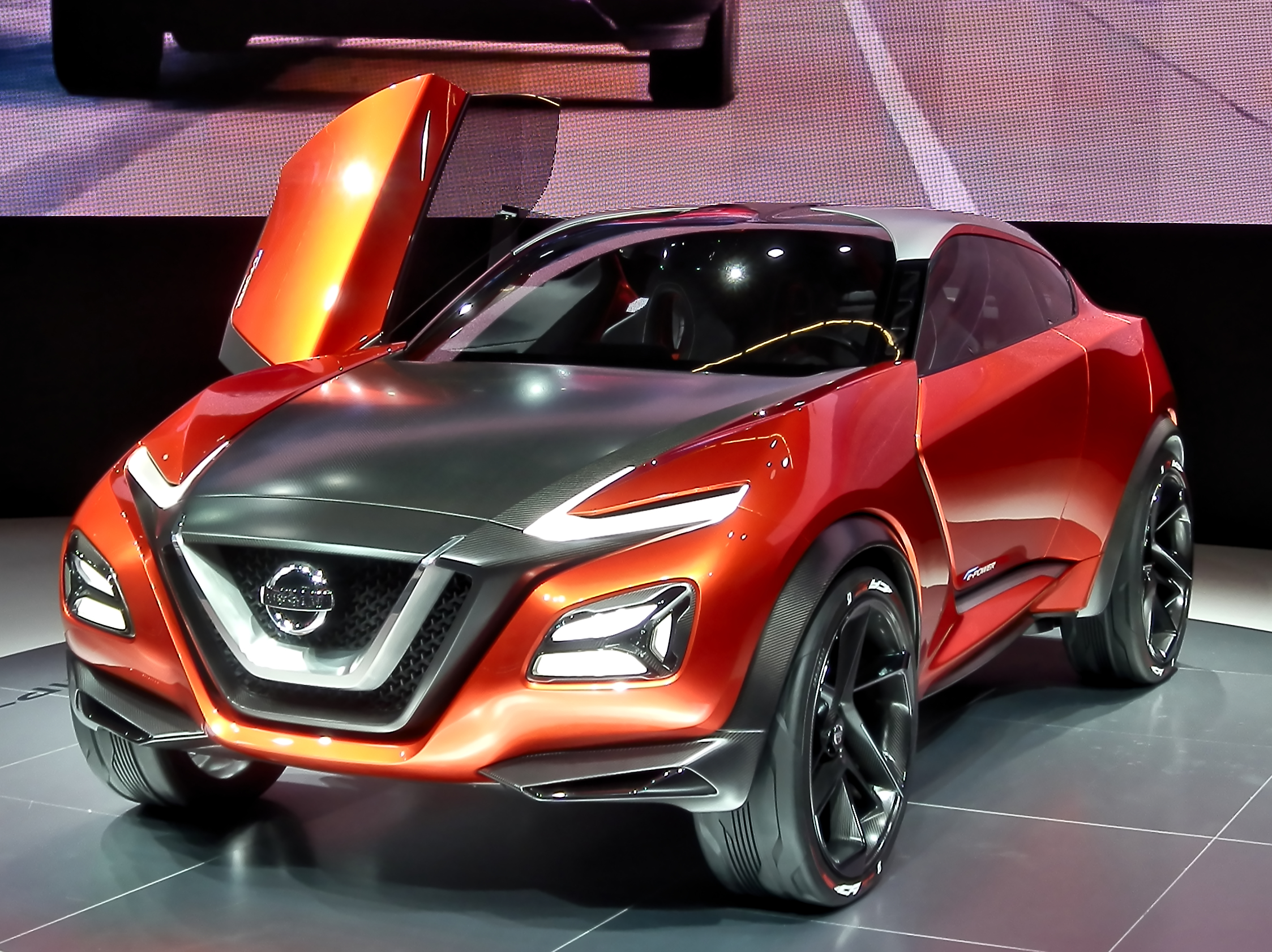
Nissan Gripz concept

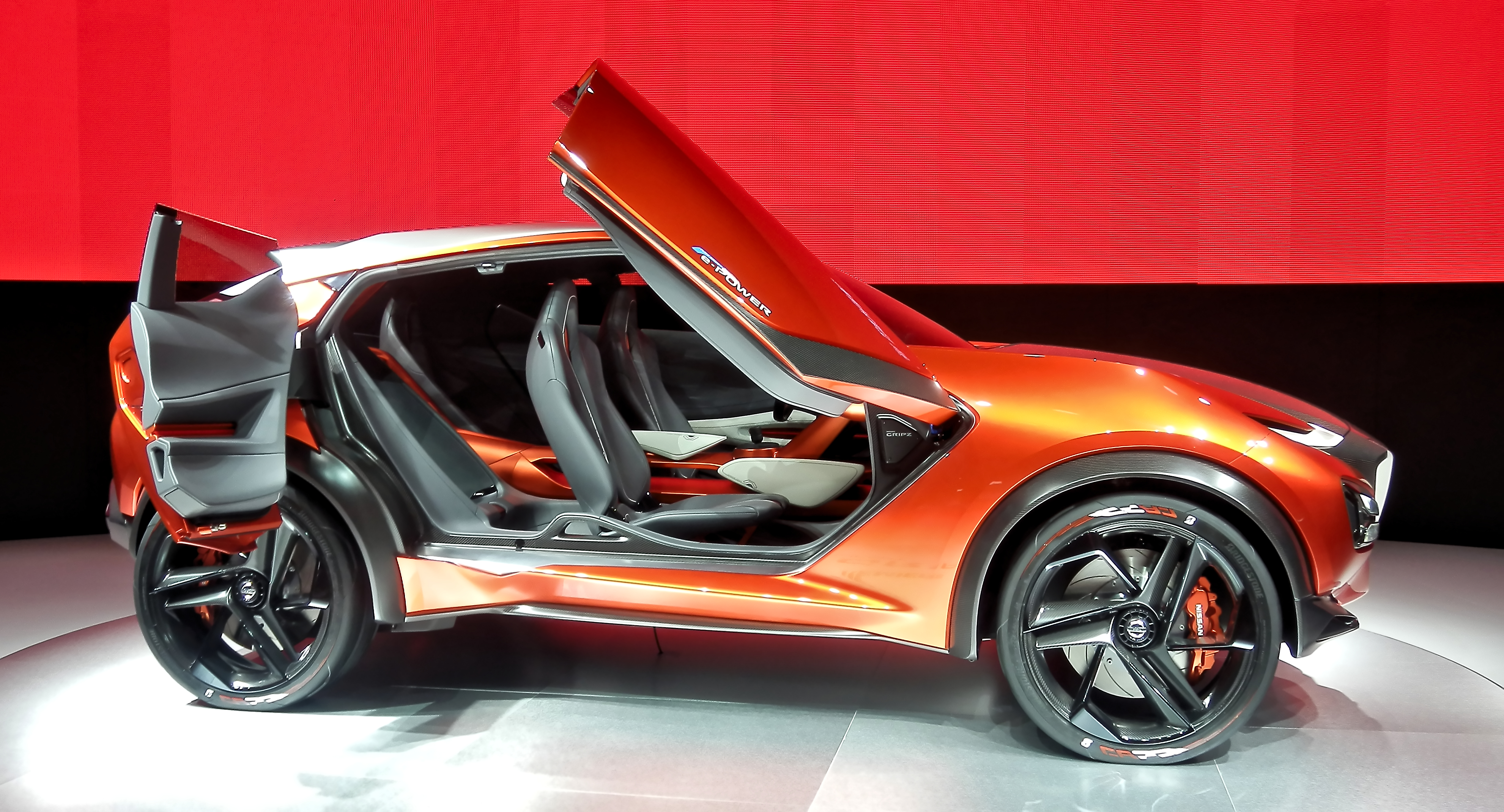
Side view

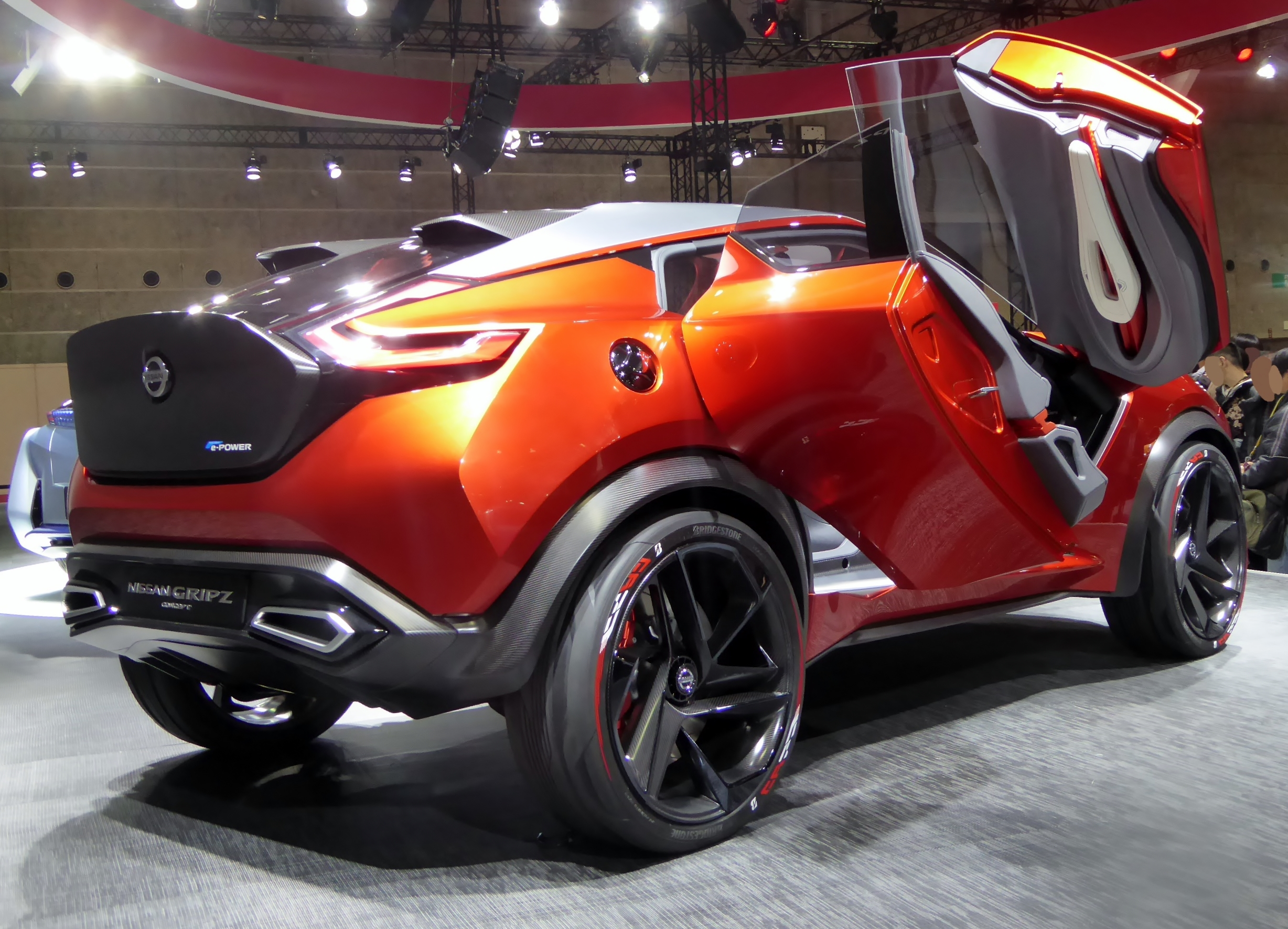
Rear view

=== Overview ===
The second-generation Juke was unveiled on 3 September 2019 in London, Paris, Milan, Barcelona and Cologne. It went in production in October 2019. Nissan continued to build the Juke at its plant in Sunderland, UK. Customer deliveries begun in late November in European markets.

The vehicle is larger than its predecessor, and based on an all-new CMF-B platform shared with the second-generation Renault Captur and the fifth-generation Renault Clio. The new platform makes extensive use of high-strength steel which is claimed to offer better stability, performance, and cornering capabilities. Despite that, the second-generation Juke is lighter by around 23 kg (51 lb) compared to the previous-generation model.

Nissan claims rear-seat knee room is increased by 58 mm (2.3 in), rear head room by 11 mm (0.4 in), and the boot capacity is now 20 percent bigger at 422 L (14.9 cu ft) because of its larger size. The new Juke adopts an all-new dashboard layout with a 'floating' central display, a new multifunction steering wheel, and a reduced number of buttons on the centre console.

Initial engine option is the 1.0-litre three-cylinder DIG-T turbocharged petrol engine which produces 117 PS (115 hp; 86 kW) and 180 N⋅m (18.4 kg⋅m; 133 lb⋅ft). In March 2022, a 1.6-litre petrol hybrid engine option from the Renault Captur was introduced alongside the 2022 improved model.

For most markets outside Europe and Australasia, the second-generation Juke was never introduced as it was replaced by the V platform-based Kicks. The Kicks was revealed in North America in 2017 for 2018 model year, directly replacing the Juke. The Juke was also phased out in Japan and several Southeast Asian markets in favour of the Kicks e-Power.

The second-generation Juke was released in Australia in May 2020, with four trim levels available. It was also launched in Taiwan in November 2020, and sold alongside the locally assembled Kicks.

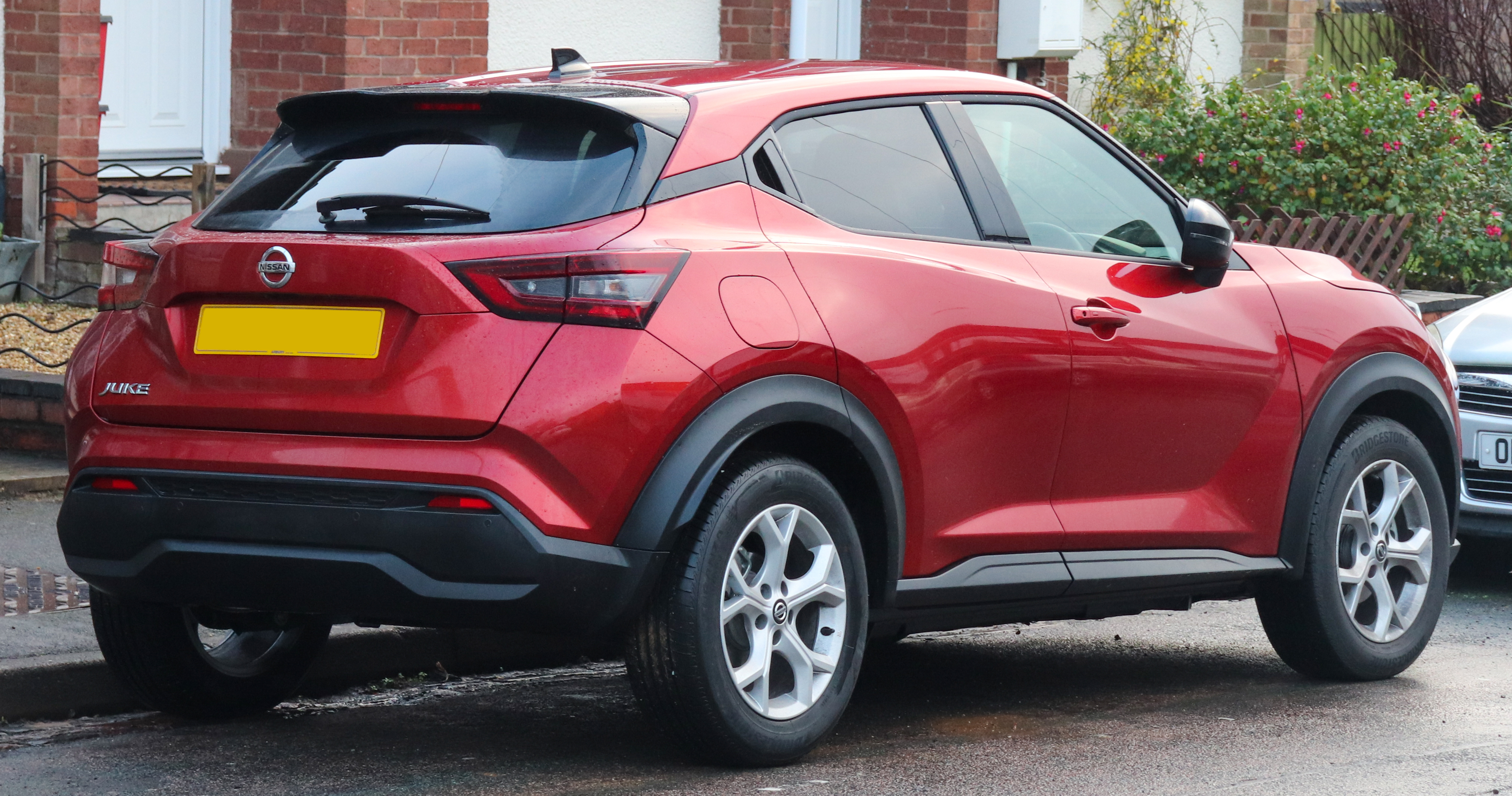
Rear view (pre-facelift)

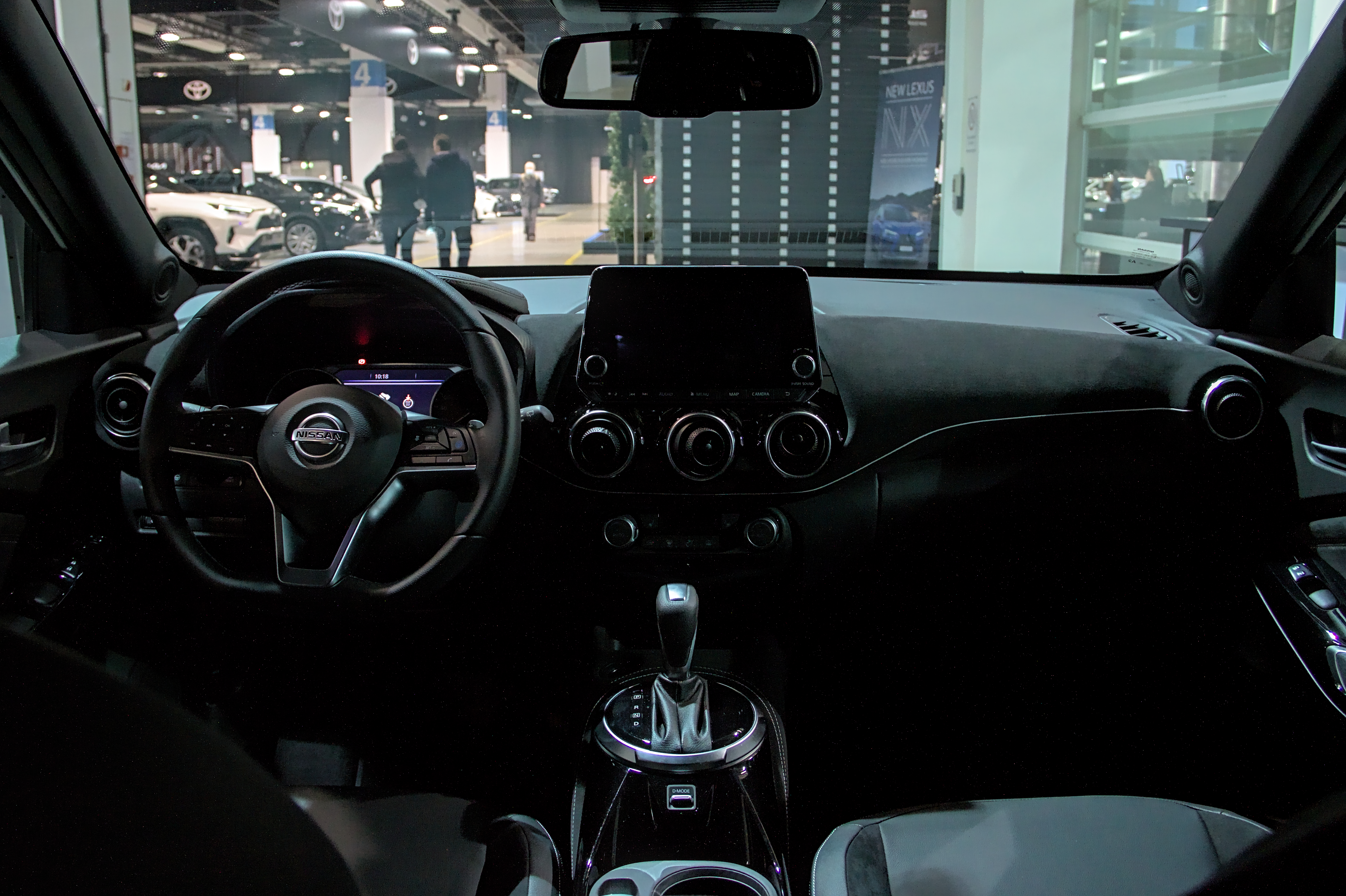
Interior

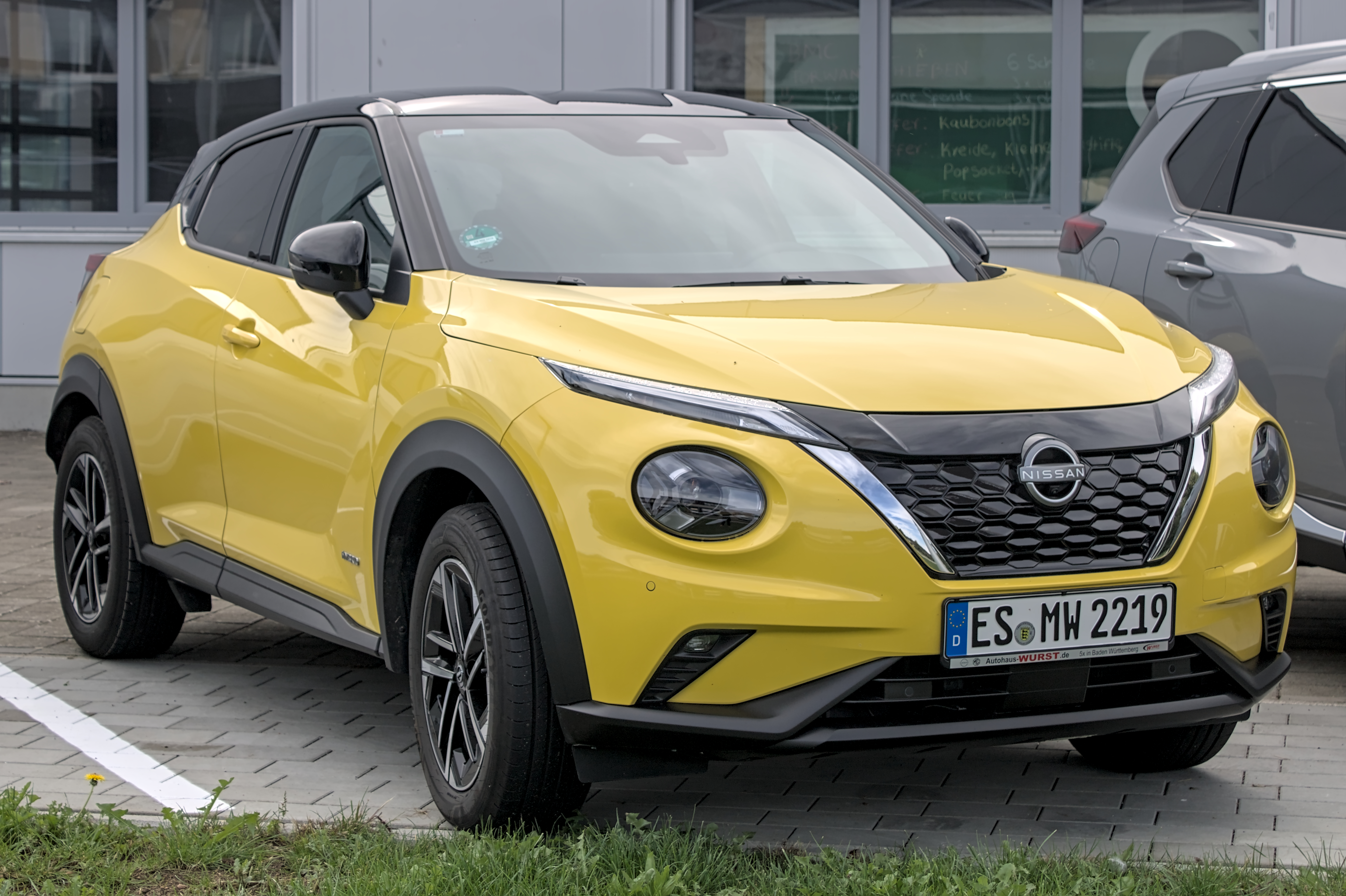
Juke Hybrid (facelift)

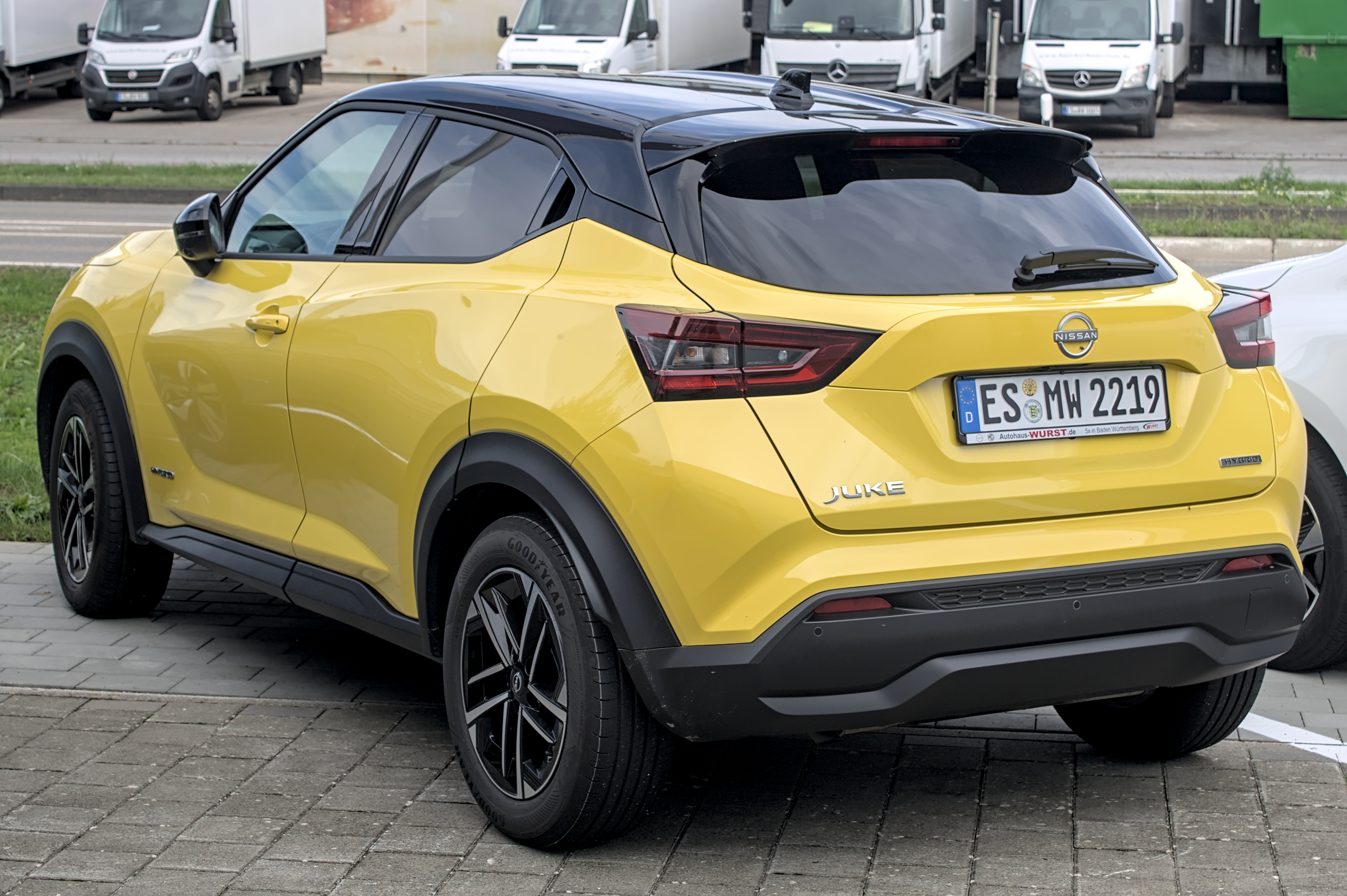
Juke Hybrid (facelift)

=== Safety ===
The second-generation Juke was awarded a full five-star rating by Euro NCAP.

Euro NCAP test results* Nissan Juke (2019)
Test	Points	%
Overall:	5 /5 stars	
Adult occupant:	36.0	94%
Child occupant:	42.1	85%
Pedestrian:	39.0	81%
Safety assist:	9.6	73%

ANCAP test results* Nissan Juke (2019, aligned with Euro NCAP)
Test	Points	%
Overall:	5 /5 stars	
Adult occupant:	36	94%
Child occupant:	43.1	87%
Pedestrian:	38.9	81%
Safety assist:	9.2	71%

== Third generation (F17; 2027) ==
Third generation
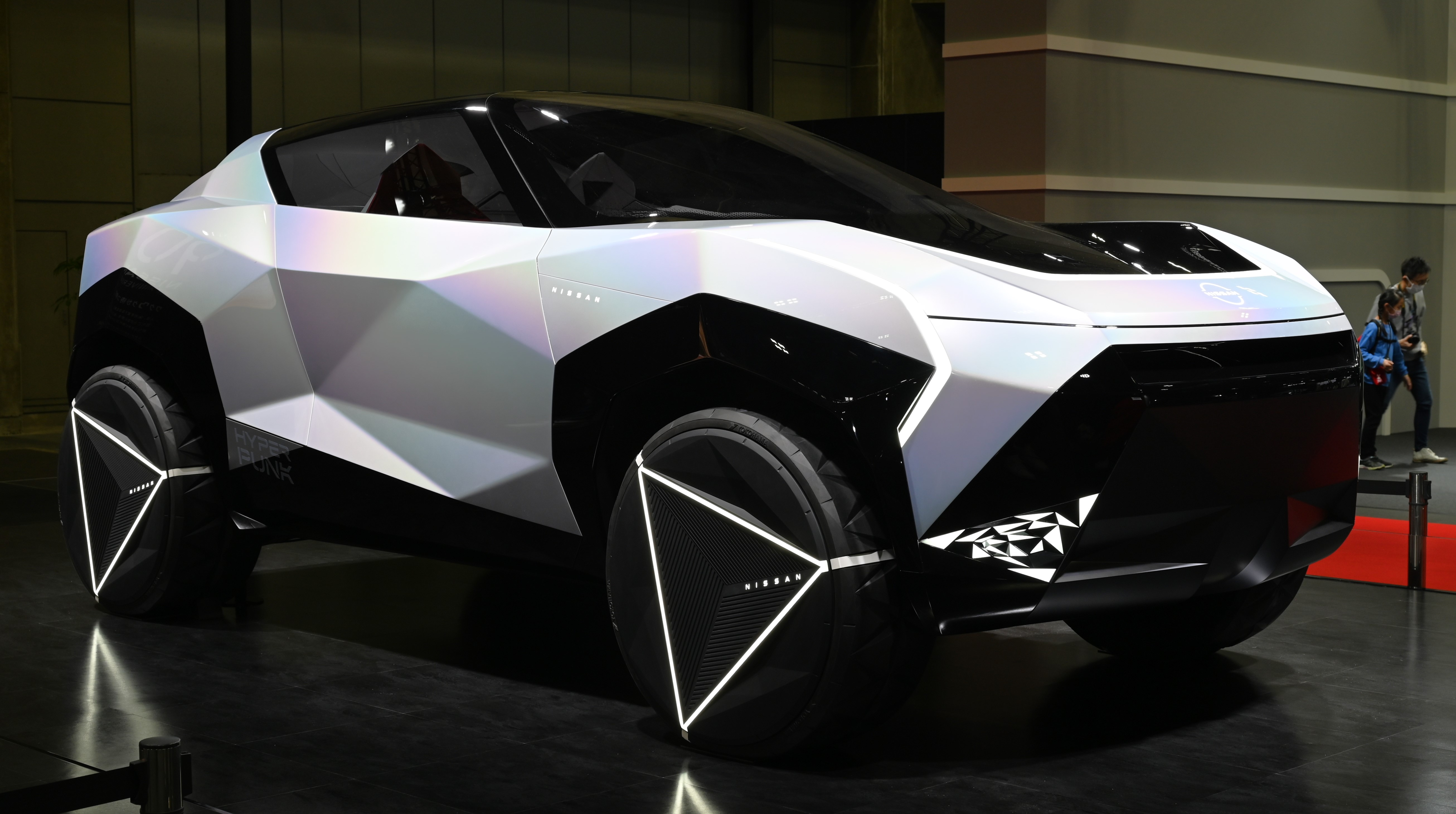
- Hyper Punk concept, which previewed the third-generation Juke.

Overview
- Model code: F17
- Production: 2027 (to commence)
- Assembly: United Kingdom: Sunderland (NMUK)

Body and chassis
- Layout: Front-motor, front-wheel-drive
- Platform: AmpR Medium
- Related: Nissan Ariya; Nissan Leaf (ZE2)

=== Hyper Punk concept ===
The Hyper Punk Concept was showcased on 19 October 2023, previewing the third-generation Juke.

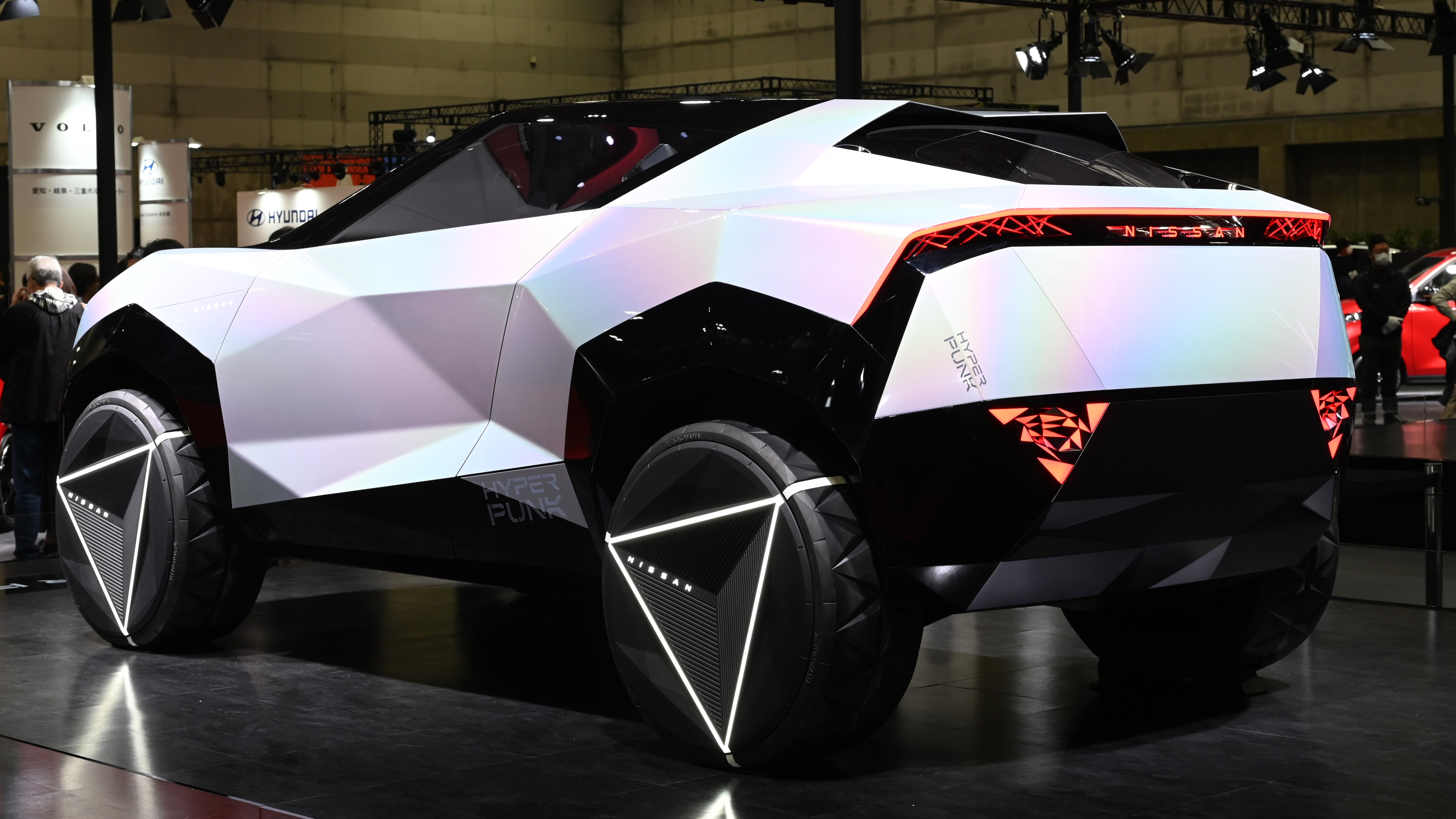
Rear view

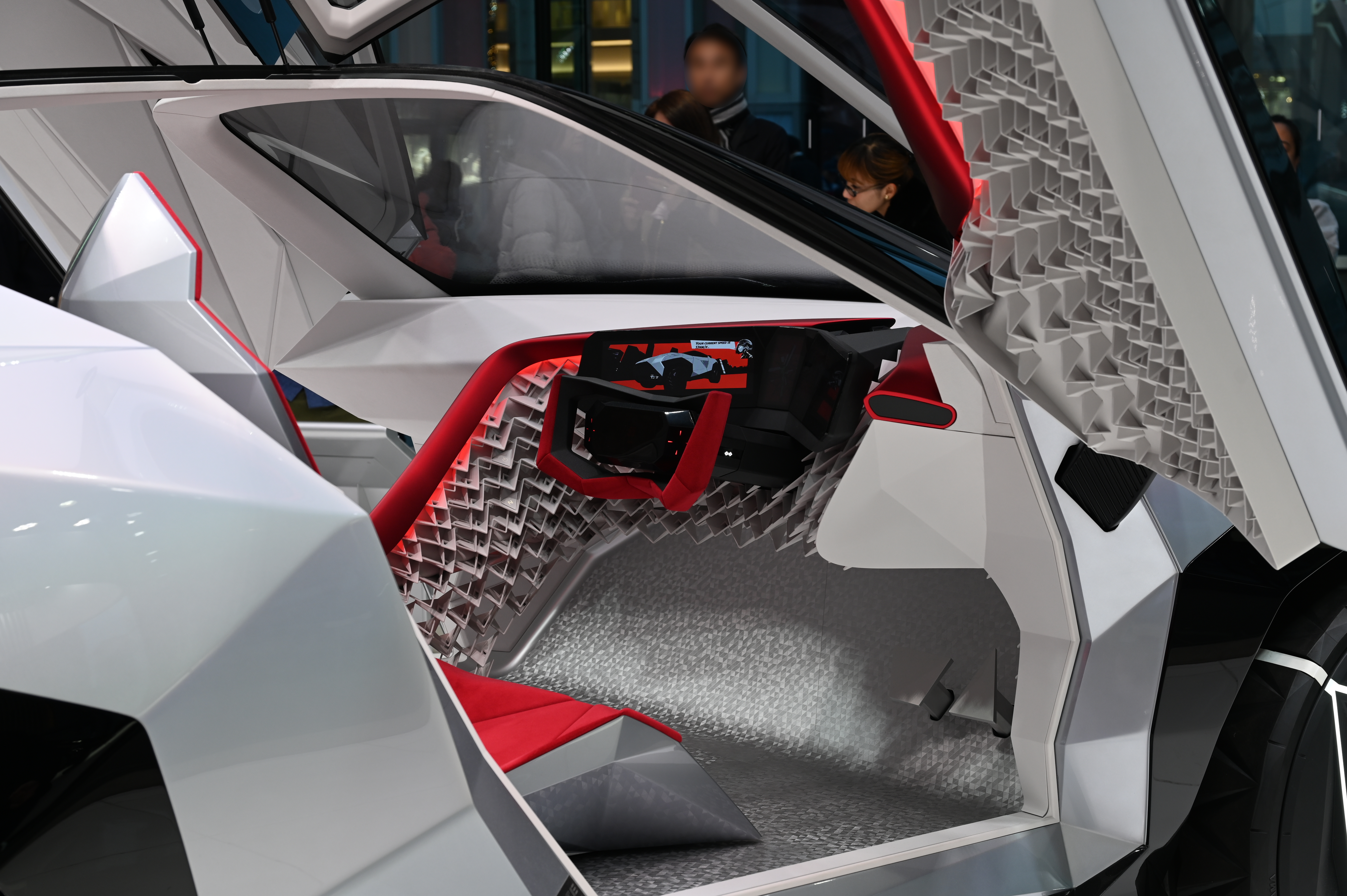
Interior

=== Overview ===
The third-generation Juke (F17) was unveiled on 14 April 2026 at Nissan’s Vision event, held at the company’s global headquarters in Japan, alongside the next-generation Nissan Rogue/X-Trail. Unlike its predecessor, the new Juke was introduced exclusively as a battery electric vehicle, making it the first fully electric version of the model. Nissan positioned the vehicle as a central part of its European electrification strategy.

The Juke is based on the CMF-EV platform, which it shares with the Nissan Leaf and Nissan Ariya. It is manufactured at Nissan’s Sunderland plant in the United Kingdom, where pilot production began following the vehicle’s debut. Nissan did not initially disclose detailed battery capacity, output, range, or charging specifications.

The vehicle was revealed alongside the fourth-generation X-Trail, known as the Rogue in North America. While the X-Trail debuted with Nissan’s e-POWER series-hybrid technology, the Juke adopted a fully electric powertrain, reflecting Nissan’s multi-pathway approach to electrification. The third-generation Juke was scheduled to reach the market in spring 2027.

== Reception ==
It was reported that customers of the Juke mainly consisted of young buyers and the elderly, resulting in an average age in the late 40s. The car's styling proved somewhat polarizing in terms of reception.

In Europe, it is Nissan's second best-selling car behind the Qashqai. U.S. sales of the Juke slowed in 2015, but the crossover sold 38,000 units in 2013 and 2014, and about 36,000 in 2011 and 2012.

== Awards and recognition ==
- A Nissan Juke driven by stunt-driver Terry Grant claimed a Guinness World Record when it was driven around the Goodwood Hill Course on two wheels for 2 minutes and 55 seconds.
- The Nissan Juke received The Grand Tour's 2017 "Nissan Juke Award" for the worst car of the year.

== Sales ==
Year	Japan	Europe (Note: Europe: 2020 EU 27 + UK + Switzerland + Norway + Iceland)	U.S.	Canada	Indonesia	Thailand
2010	22,803	22,228	8,639	825		
2011	34,224	101,147	35,886	4,586	9,573	
2012	33,648	101,440	36,358	3,738	6,564	
2013	18,727	106,411	38,157	4,077	3,128	
2014	14,444	97,538	38,184	3,641	1,100	10,236
2015	9,622	102,574	27,121	4,473	850	2,250
2016	8,645	98,108	19,577	4,442	305	1,096
2017	5,091	91,744	10,157	1,900	229	882
2018	4,043	68,773	731		146	
2019	3,052	47,519	11		75	
2020	425	58,402			5	
2021		62,535				
2022		45,710				
