= Terry Grant (stunt driver) =

British stunt driver

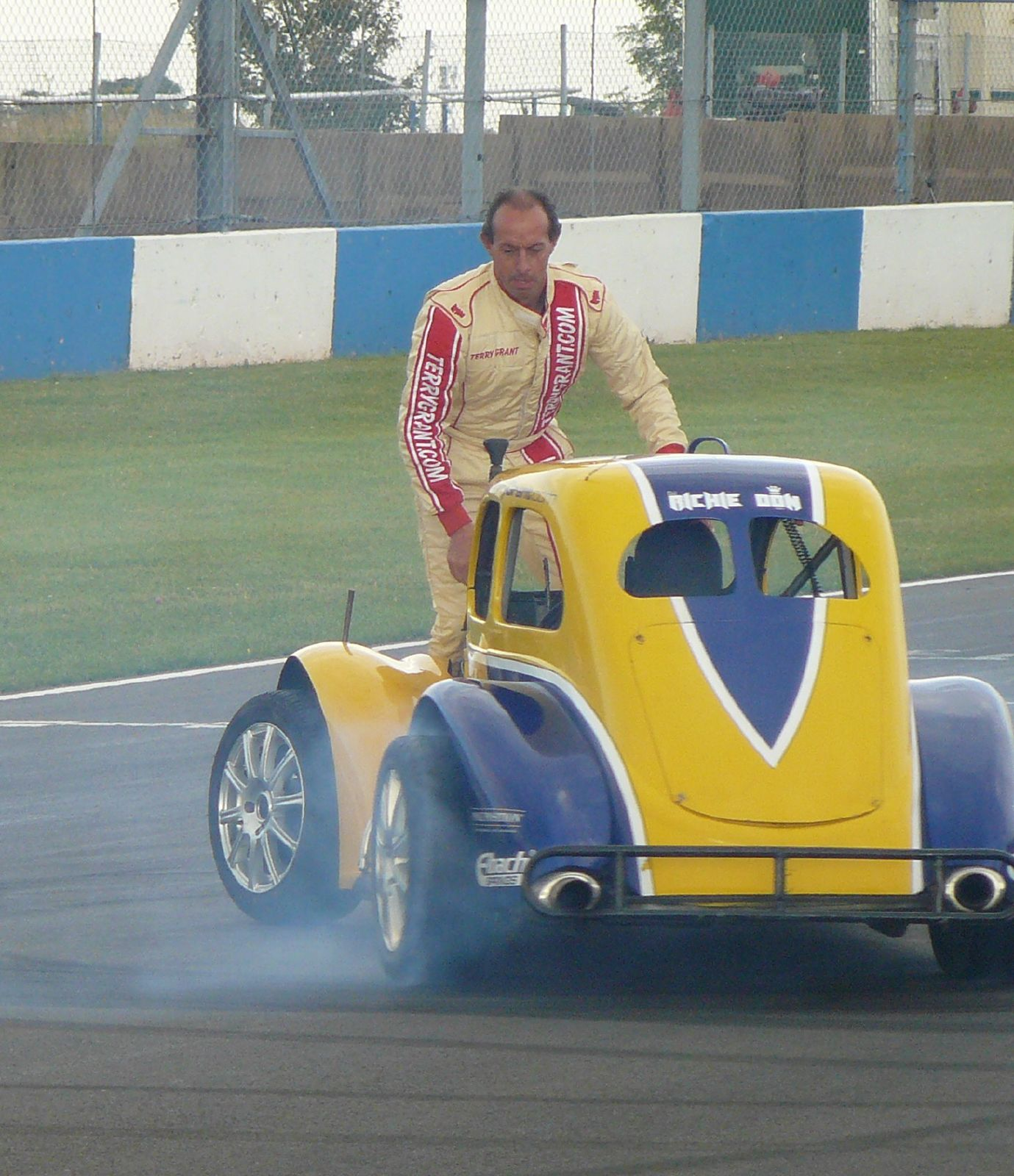
- Grant performing in 2007
- Born: October 25, 1963 (age 61); Stevenage, Hertfordshire, England
- Occupation: stunt driver
- Years active: 1995–present
- Spouse: Carol Grant
- Children: 3

Terry Grant (born October 25, 1963) is a stunt driver who performs at live events around the world. He is married to Carol Grant and the father of Perry Grant, Scott Grant and Laura Grant. He is the holder of multiple world-records, including having executed the highest loop-the-loop in a car, the fastest two-wheel mile, the furthest barrel roll jump, the most doughnuts standing on the roof of a car, and the highest number of doughnuts in 100 seconds.

== Early life ==
Grant's initial exposure to driving occurred at the age of eight, when he operated a large Rover on public roads under the supervision of his father. Due to his height, Grant steered while standing, leading to an encounter with law enforcement.

At 13 years old, Grant acquired his first vehicle, an Austin 1300, for £25. Although inoperable due to a damaged gearbox, the car served as a personal space for recreation with friends. This vehicle was eventually dismantled for scrap, having never been driven during its ownership. Grant easily passed his driving test.

== Career ==
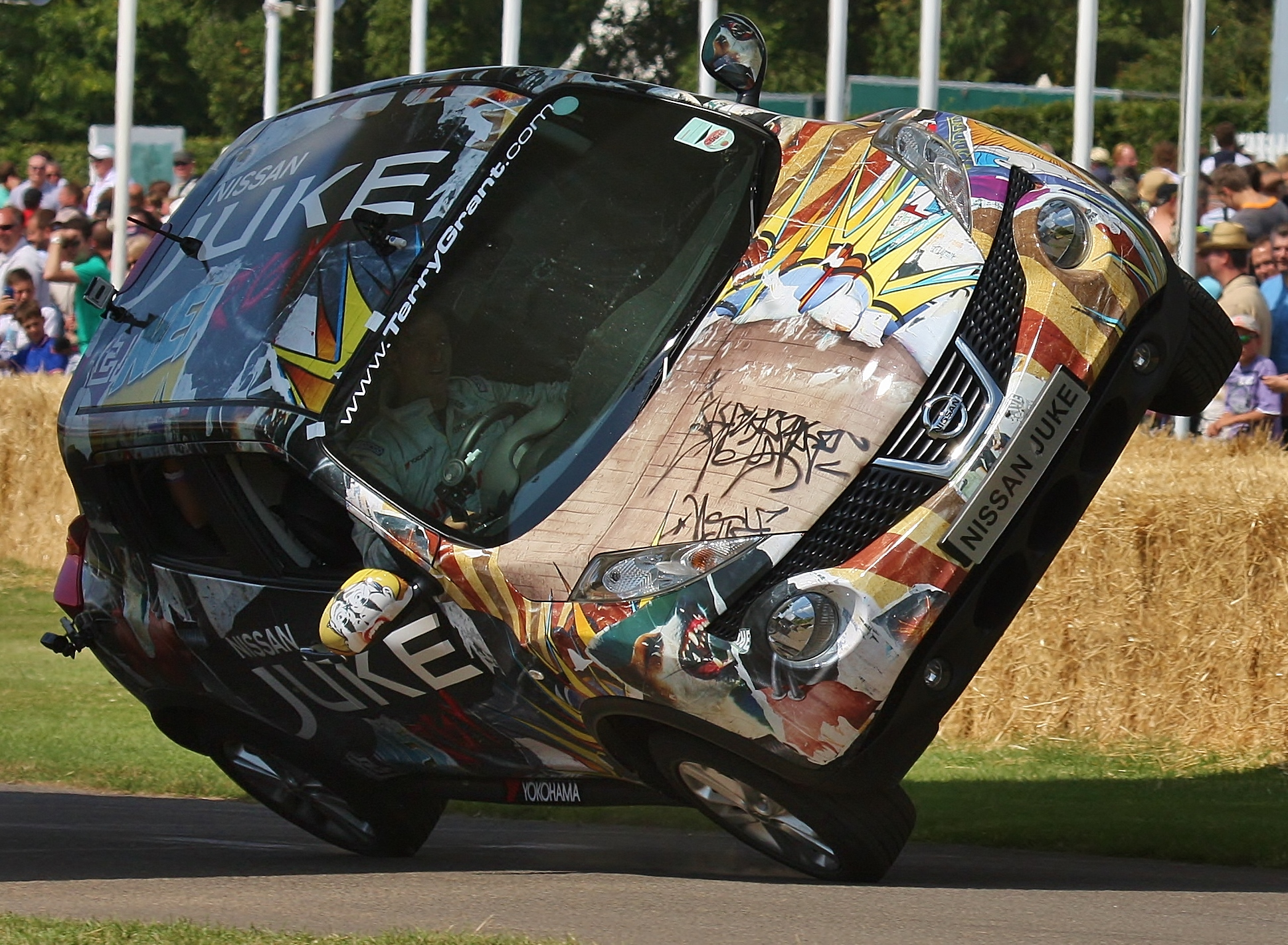
Grant driving a Nissan Juke on 2 wheels at the 2011 Goodwood Festival of Speed

In his early twenties, Grant transitioned into car racing and by 1995 he moved into stunts when he was asked to perform live on BBC Children in Need with Johnny Herbert.

Since then, he has gained international recognition for his precision driving and daring manoeuvres. This has allowed Grant to do stunts at many popular events including Goodwood Festival of Speed, where he broke the two minuted mile record, the Race of Champions, and the Silverstone Festival.

Alongside this, he operates his own stunt school, and has also worked as a stuntman on film. He has worked on Mission Impossible films with Tom Cruise and on the James Bond franchise with stunt coordinator Gary Powell.
