= Renault Symbioz =

Hybrid electric compact crossover SUV

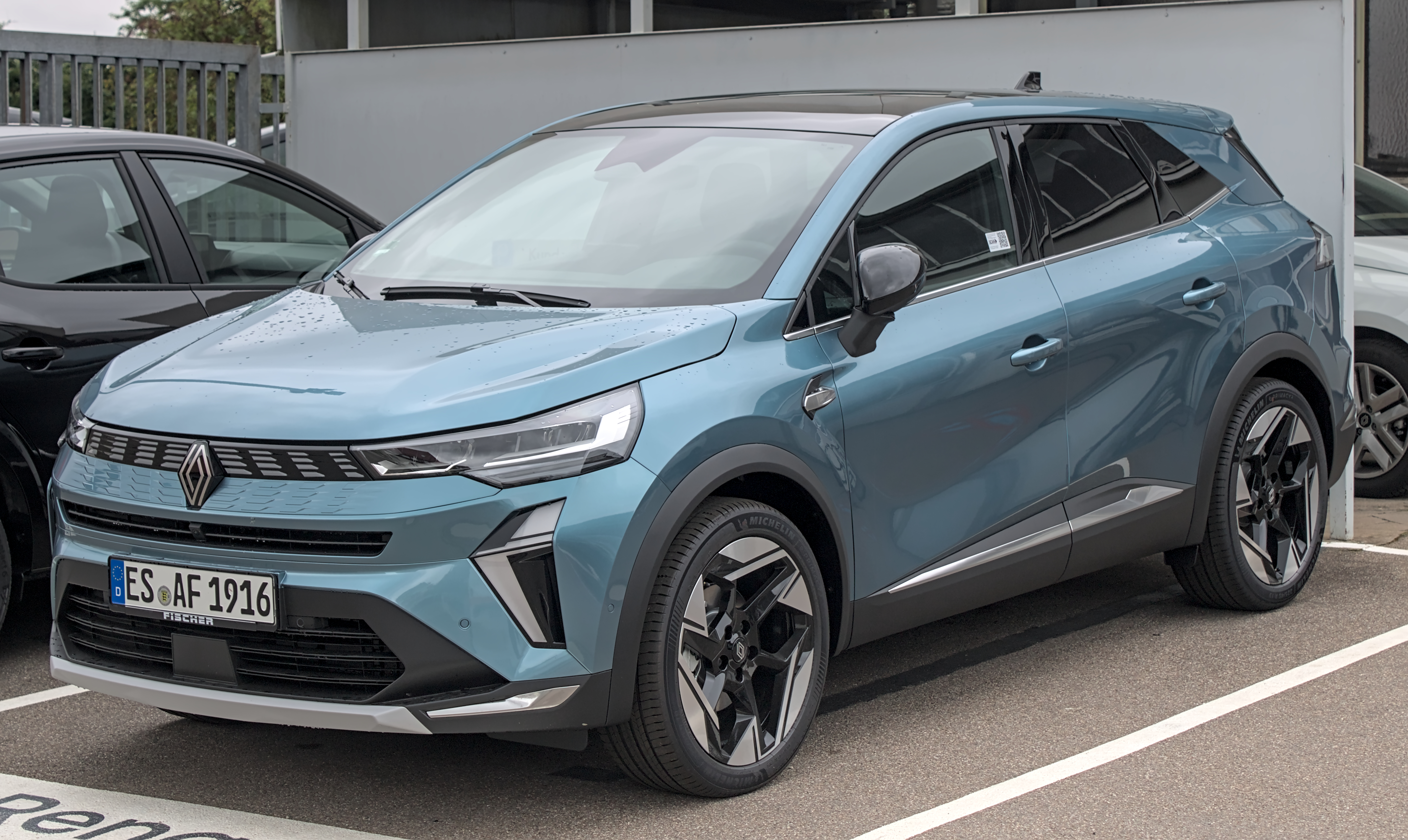

Overview
- Manufacturer: Renault
- Also called: Mitsubishi Grandis (2025–present)
- Production: 2024–present
- Assembly: Spain: Valladolid (Renault Spain)
- Designer: Gilles Vidal

Body and chassis
- Class: Compact crossover SUV (C)
- Body style: 5-door SUV
- Layout: Front-engine, front-wheel-drive
- Platform: Renault–Nissan CMF-B HS
- Related: Renault Captur II

Powertrain
- Engine: Petrol hybrid: 1.6 E-Tech 145 ch; 1.8 E-Tech 160 ch; Petrol/LPG: 1.2 Eco-G 120
- Electric motor: 12V electric motor/generator micro-hybridization solution (μHEV); 2x PMSM (E-Tech Hybrid)
- Power output: 107 kW (143 hp; 145 PS) (1.6 E-Tech Hybrid); 103 kW (138 hp; 140 PS) (1.3 MHEV); 125 kW (168 hp; 170 PS) (1.8 E-Tech Hybrid)
- Transmission: 6-speed Multi-Mode automatic (1.6 E-Tech Hybrid); 6-speed manual; 7-speed DCT; 6-speed Multi-Mode DB45S clutchless automatic (1.8 E-Tech Hybrid)
- Hybrid drivetrain: Mild hybrid; Power-split (E-Tech Hybrid)
- Battery: 1.4 kWh BTA Gen2 Li-ion (1.8 E-Tech Hybrid)

Dimensions
- Wheelbase: 2,638 mm (103.9 in)
- Length: 4,410 mm (173.6 in)
- Width: 1,790 mm (70.5 in)
- Height: 1,570 mm (61.8 in)
- Kerb weight: 1,284–1,390 kg (2,831–3,064 lb)

The Renault Symbioz is a compact crossover SUV (C-segment) by French manufacturer Renault. It is an extended version of the Captur, built on the CMF-B HS platform shared with the Renault Clio and Nissan Juke.

== Overview ==
The Symbioz was announced by the manufacturer on 8 February 2024 and was later revealed on 2 May 2024. It takes the name from the Greek word "symbiosis", which translates to "living together", as well as the unrelated concept car of the same name, which was presented at the 2017 Frankfurt Motor Show. The Symbioz is equipped with the OpenR Link system and features an electrochromic panoramic glass roof, sold under the name Solarbay, on select models.

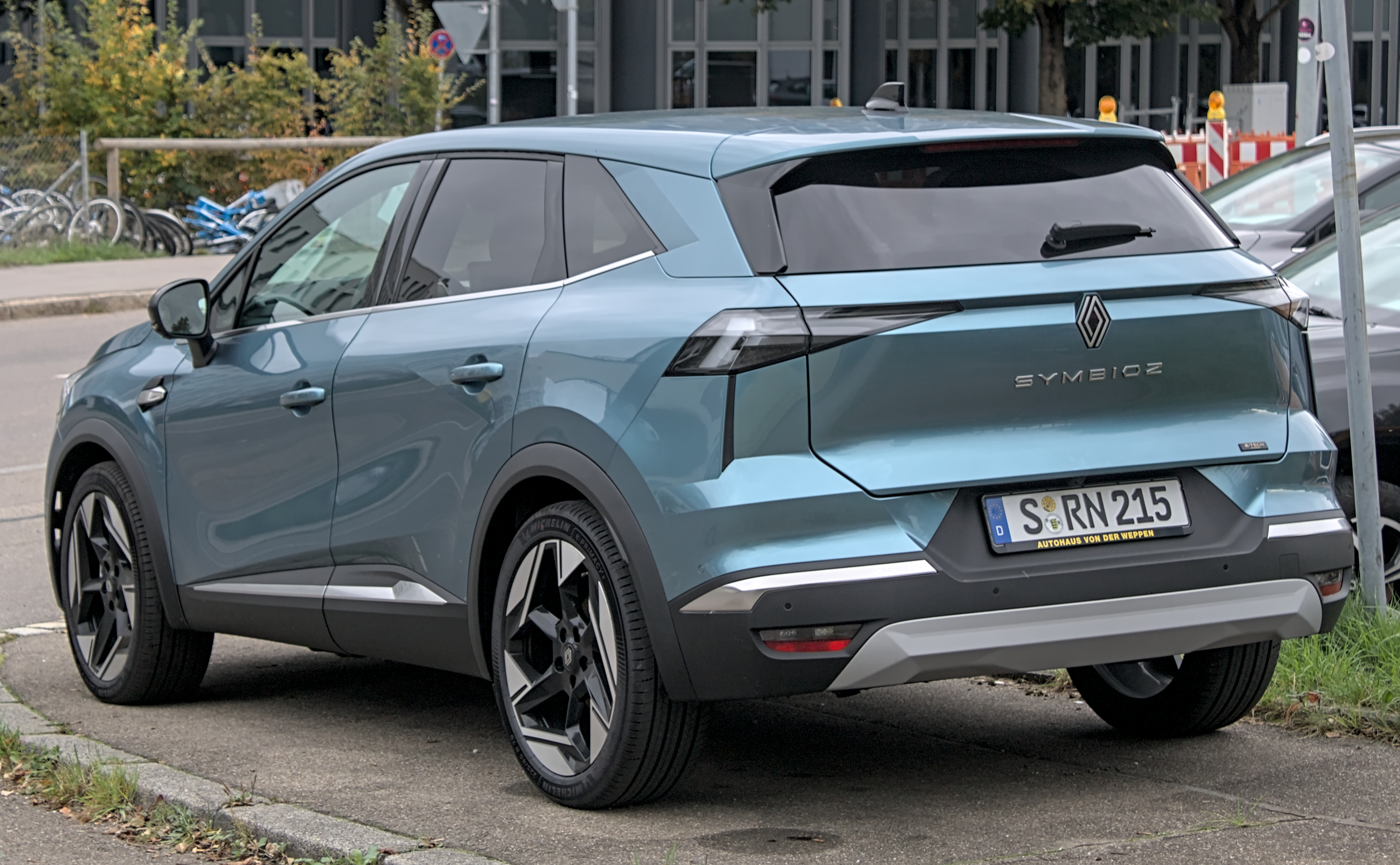
Rear view

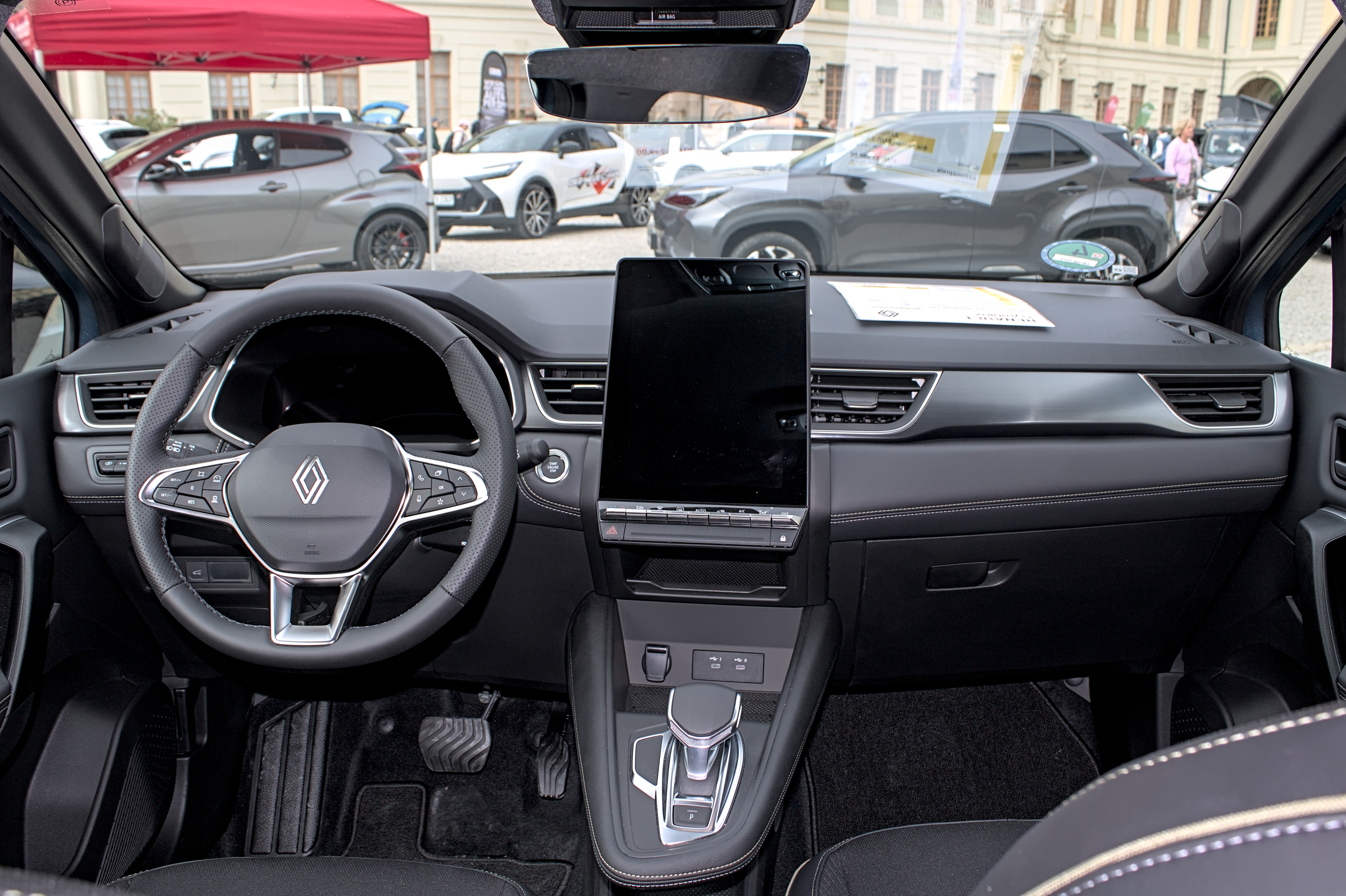
Interior (Symbioz)

=== Mitsubishi Grandis ===
Mitsubishi Motors rebadged the Symbioz as the Mitsubishi Grandis, which was unveiled on 2 July 2025.

Mitsubishi Grandis

Rear view

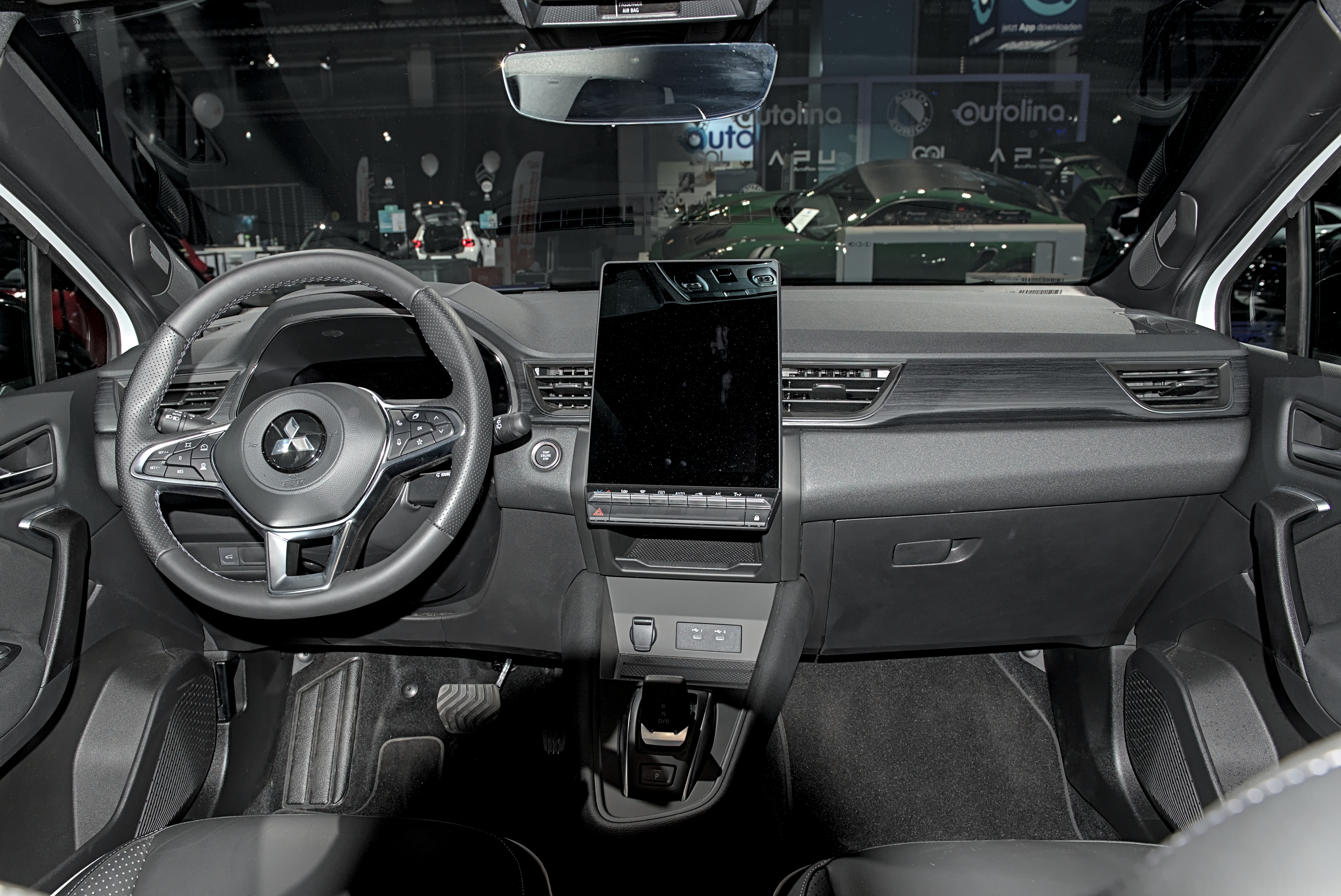
Interior

== Safety ==
Euro NCAP test results Renault Symbioz E-Tech (LHD) (2024)
Test	Points	%
Overall:	4 /5 stars	
Adult occupant:	29.6	73%
Child occupant:	39.5	80%
Pedestrian:	48.4	76%
Safety assist:	12.5	69%
