= Renault Captur =

Subcompact crossover SUV

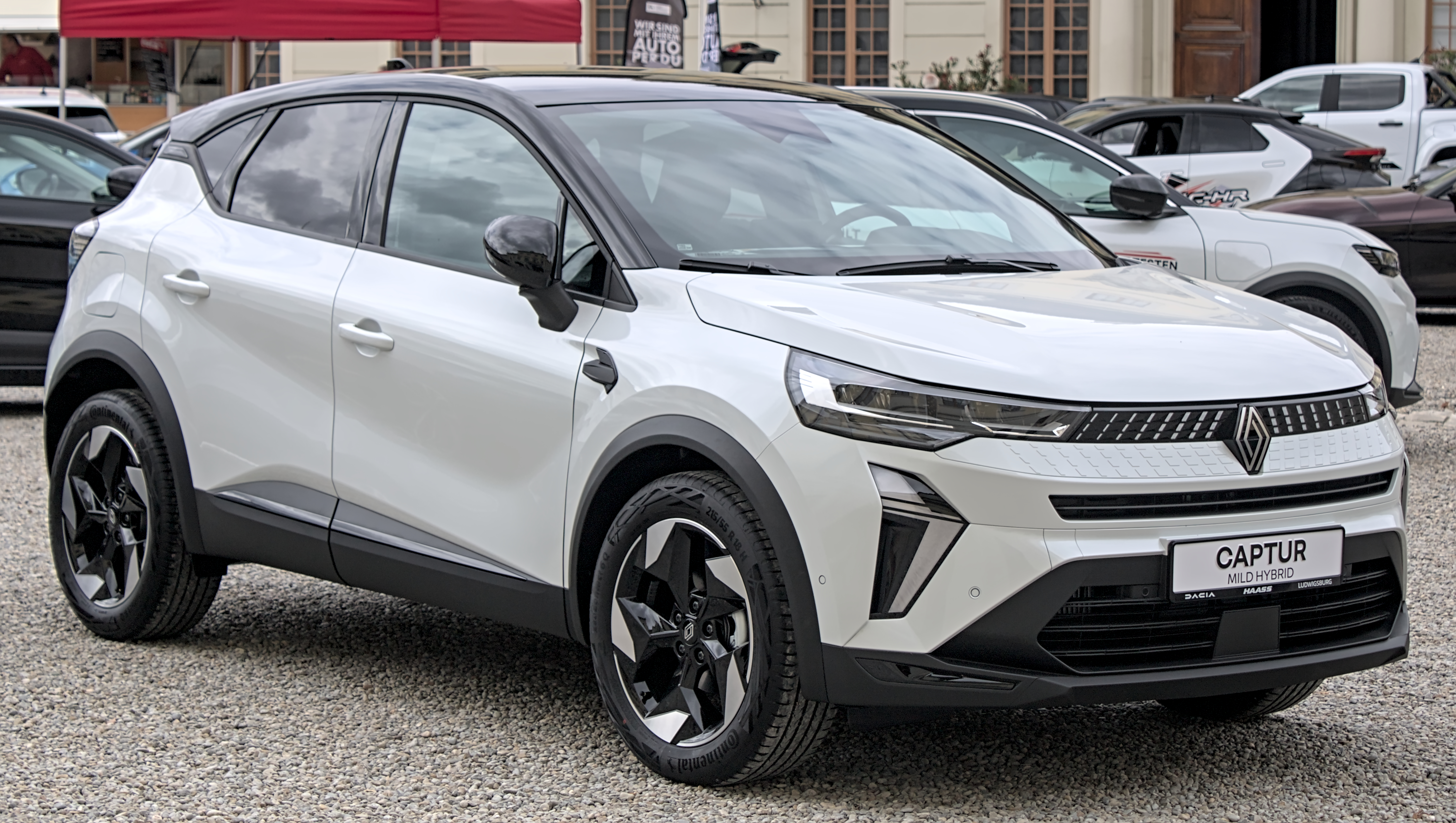

Overview
- Manufacturer: Renault
- Also called: Renault Kaptur (CIS, 2016–2022); Mitsubishi ASX (2023–present)
- Production: 2013–present

Body and chassis
- Class: Subcompact crossover SUV (B)
- Body style: 5-door SUV

The Renault Captur is a series of subcompact crossover SUVs manufactured by the French automaker Renault. The production version of the first one, based on the B platform, made its debut at the 2013 Geneva Motor Show and started to be marketed in France during April 2013. The Captur Concept was first shown at the 2011 Geneva Motor Show.

Under the "same skin with different specification" strategy adopted by Renault, the Captur was made in a larger version based on the low-cost B0 platform shared with the Duster. It uses the similar styling with the first-generation Captur but with an extended wheelbase, greater ground clearance and all-wheel-drive drivetrain. Referred internally as the "Captur Global Access", the vehicle was produced in Russia, Brazil and India.

The second generation model was introduced in 2019. It has a larger sister model marketed as the Renault Symbioz since 2024.

== First generation (2013) ==
There are two different versions of the first generation Captur each built on its own platform. The B platform version, codenamed J87 was produced between 2013 and 2019 and the B0 platform "Global Access" version codenamed HA started production in 2016.

=== Renault Captur (J87; 2013) ===
First generation
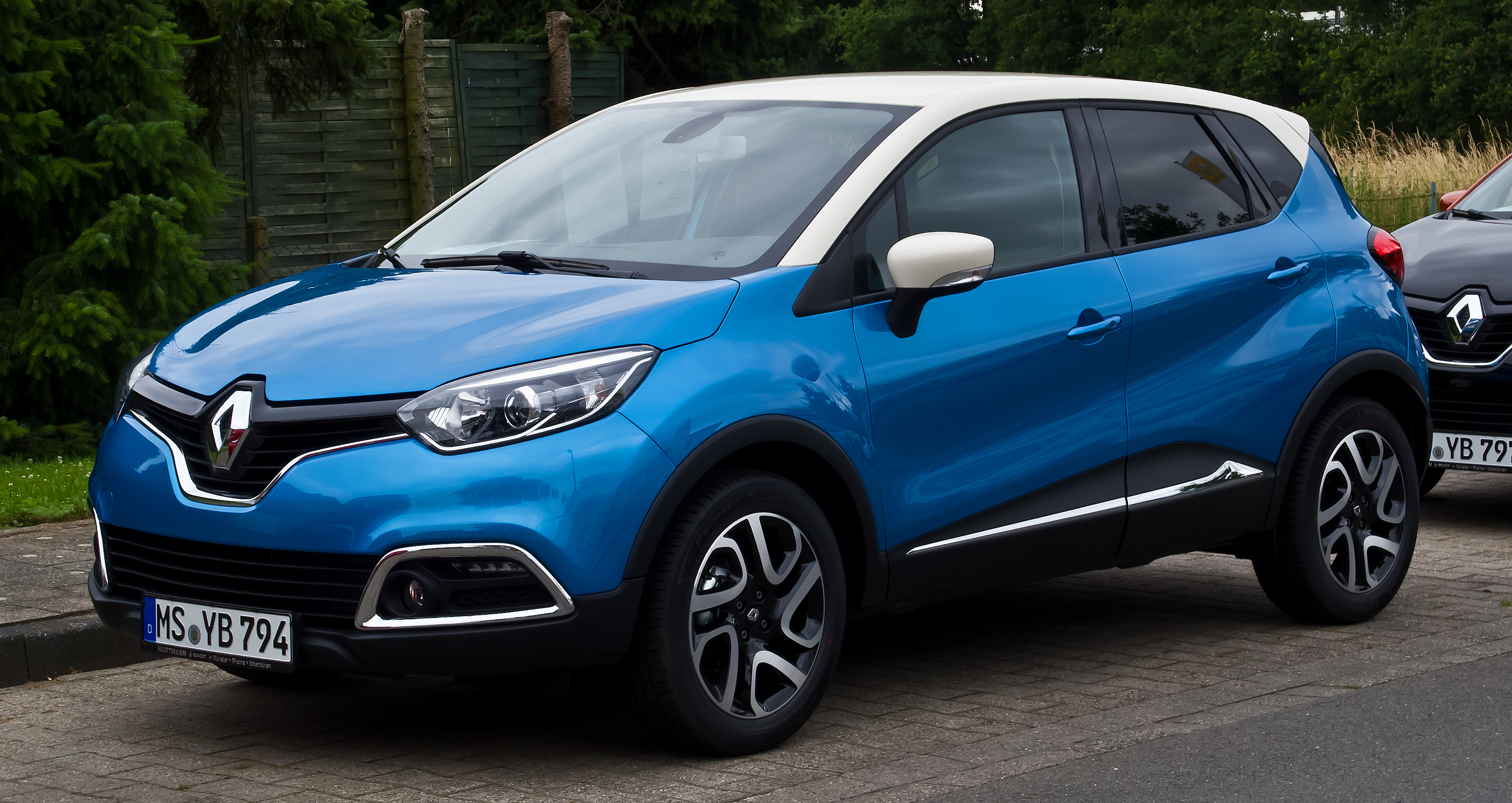

Overview
- Model code: J87
- Also called: Renault Samsung QM3 (South Korea) Renault kaptur ( Russia based on Duster platform)
- Production: 2013–2019
- Assembly: Spain: Valladolid (Renault Spain); Malaysia: Kuala Lumpur (TCMA)
- Designer: Under the lead of Laurens van den Acker

Body and chassis
- Layout: Front-engine, front-wheel-drive
- Platform: Renault-Nissan B platform Renault b0 ( kaptur )
- Related: Renault Clio IV; Nissan Juke (F15)

Powertrain
- Engine: Petrol: 0.9 L Nissan H4Bt Energy tCe I3; 1.2 L Renault-Nissan H5Ft Energy tCe I4; 1.3 L Renault-Nissan H5Ht Energy tCe I4; Diesel: 1.5 L K9K Energy dCi I4 (turbo)
- Transmission: 5-speed manual; 6-speed Getrag EDC automatic

Dimensions
- Wheelbase: 2,606 mm (102.6 in)
- Length: 4,122 mm (162.3 in)
- Width: 1,778 mm (70.0 in)
- Height: 1,567 mm (61.7 in)

The J87 Captur is based on the fourth generation Clio and rides on the B platform. It incorporates design lines from the homonymous concept, as part of Renault's renovated design strategy developed by Laurens van den Acker. It has various customisation options for the interior and the exterior.

The car suspension is made up of MacPherson struts on front and a twist-beam axle on rear. Brakes are discs on front and drums on rear.

The Captur has some new elements, such as a large drawer-like glovebox that is more easily reachable by the driver, instead of a conventional glove compartment in left hand drive models.

The Captur originally had four trim levels in the UK: Expression, Expression+, Dynamique Media Nav and Dynamique S Media Nav. In December 2013, Renault added a top-of-the-range Signature trim and, in 2015, the Iconic. In 2018, the Captur added the sportier S-edition. As standard, it has parking sensors and voice activation for certain functions. In some versions, it also adds removable seat covers with zippers, a new Renault satellite navigation system with touchscreen, reverse cameras and automated head lamps and windscreen wiper.

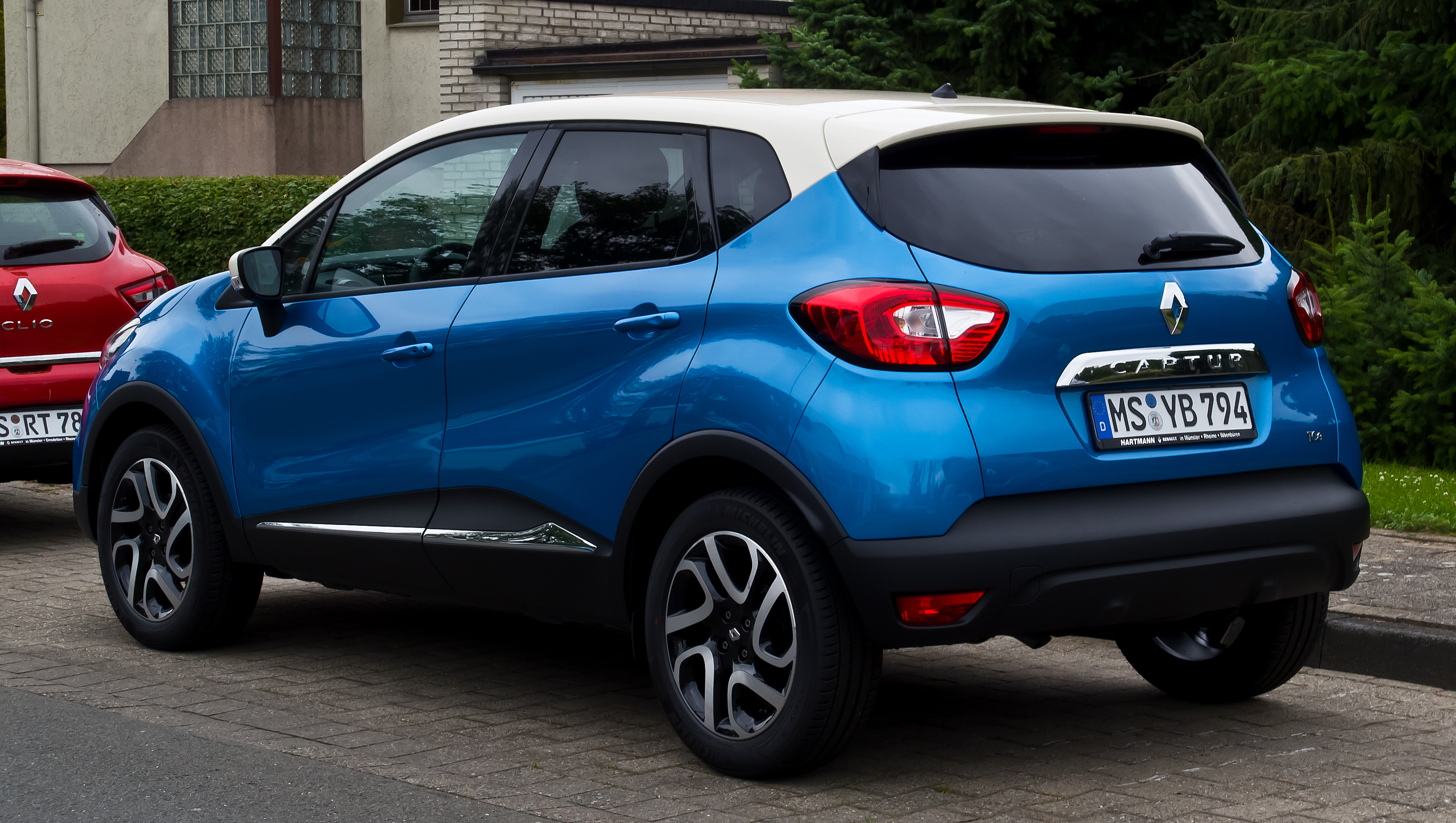
Rear view

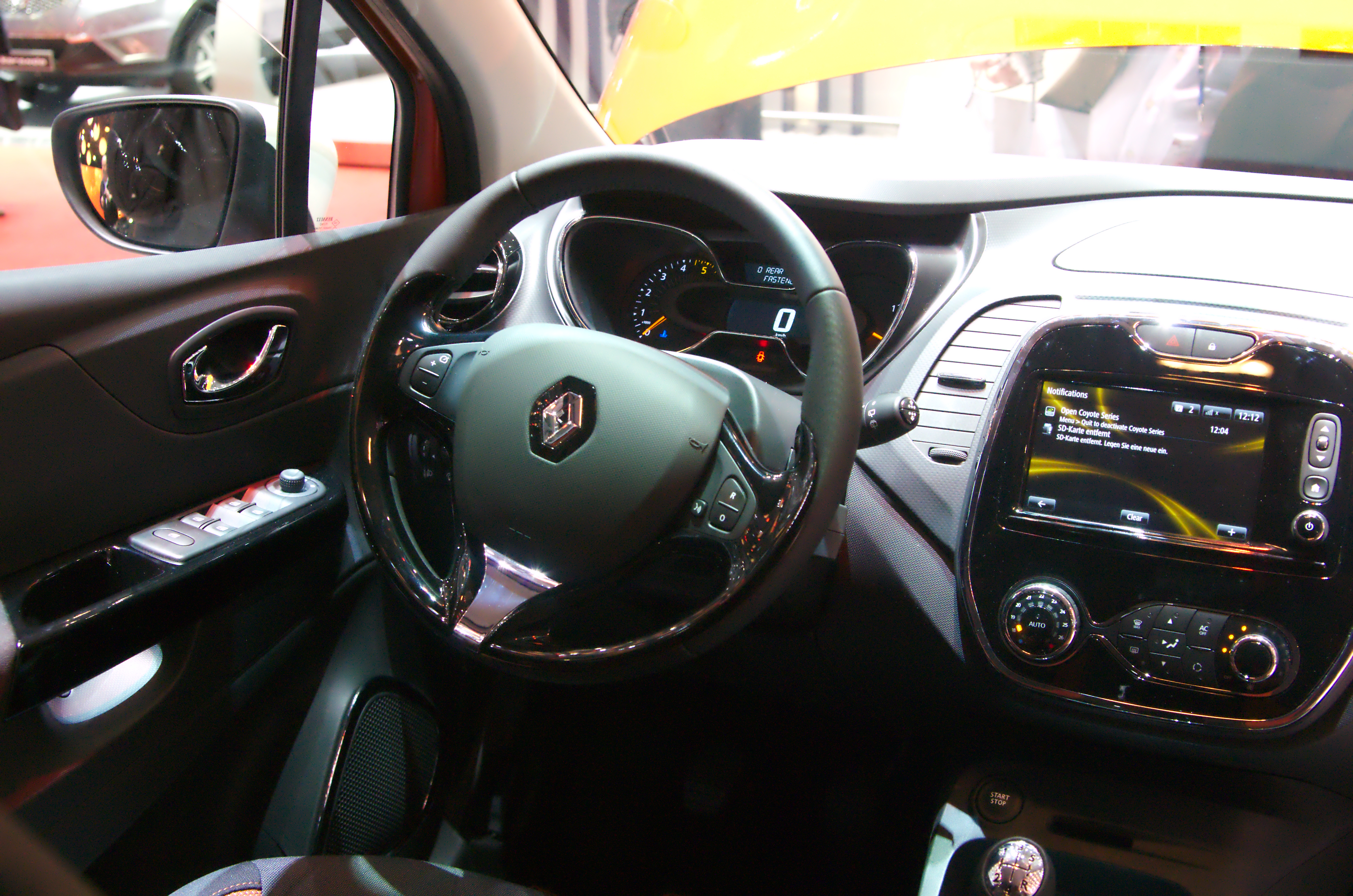
Interior

==== Safety ====
The Captur achieved a five star rating at the 2013 Euro NCAP tests. Between its standard safety equipment, it has three point seat belts, two airbags, cruise control, speed limiter, ESC, ABS and audible and visual seat belt reminder warnings. Renault Captur is also equipped with Hill-Start assist feature.

Euro NCAP test results* Renault Captur 1.0 'Zen' (LHD) (2013)
Test	Points	%
Overall:	5 /5 stars	
Adult occupant:	32	88%
Child occupant:	39	79%
Pedestrian:	22	61%
Safety assist:	7	81%

ANCAP test results* Renault Captur 3 cylinder petrol variants (2013, aligned with Euro NCAP)
Test	Points	%
Overall:	5 /5 stars	
Adult occupant:	31.8	88%
Child occupant:	39	79%
Pedestrian:	22.1	61%
Safety assist:	7.3	81%

==== Facelift ====
In May 2017, Renault introduced a facelifted Captur with slightly revised interior and exterior designs, more customisation options and improved equipment.

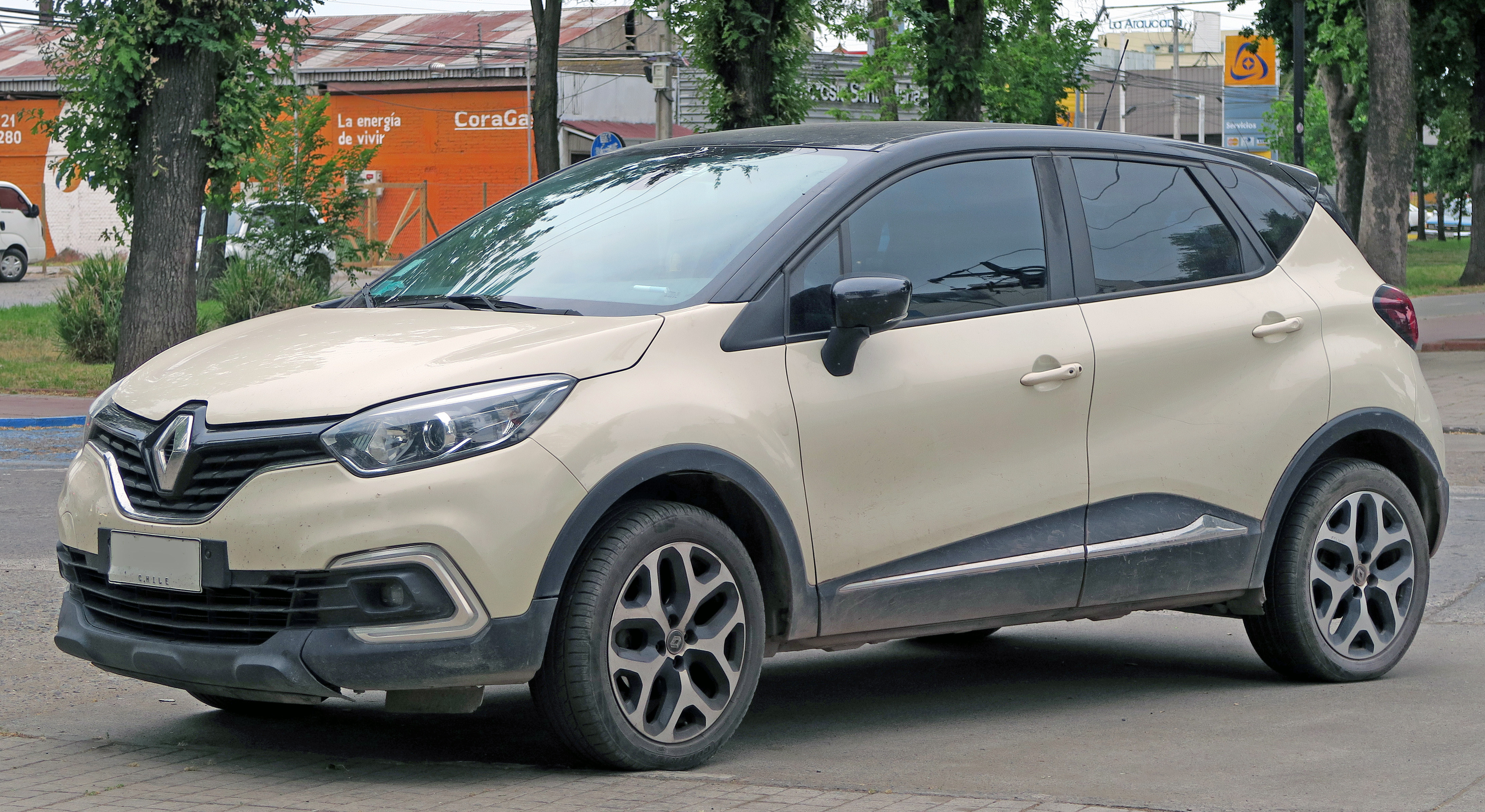
2018 Renault Captur Zen (facelift)

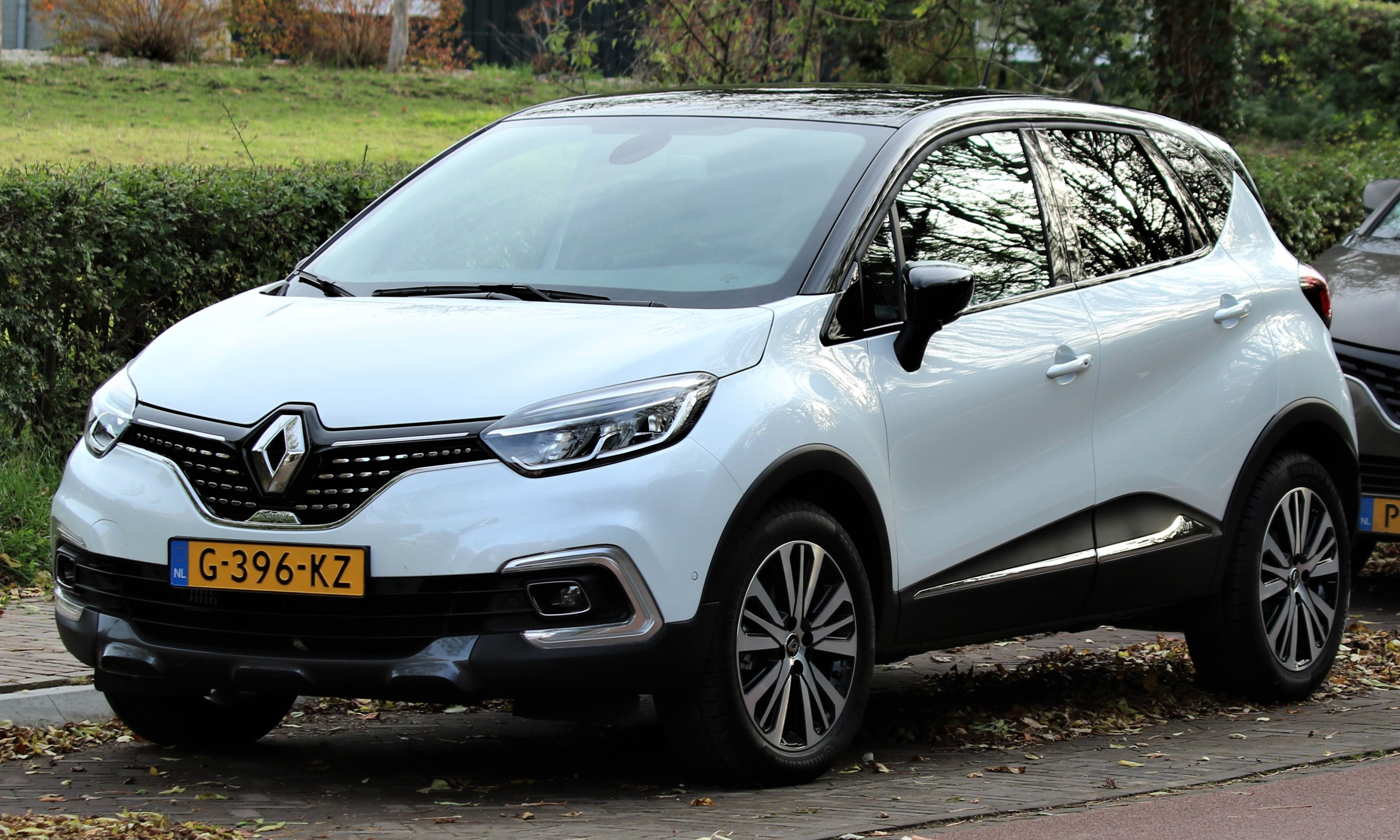
Renault Captur Initiale Paris (facelift)

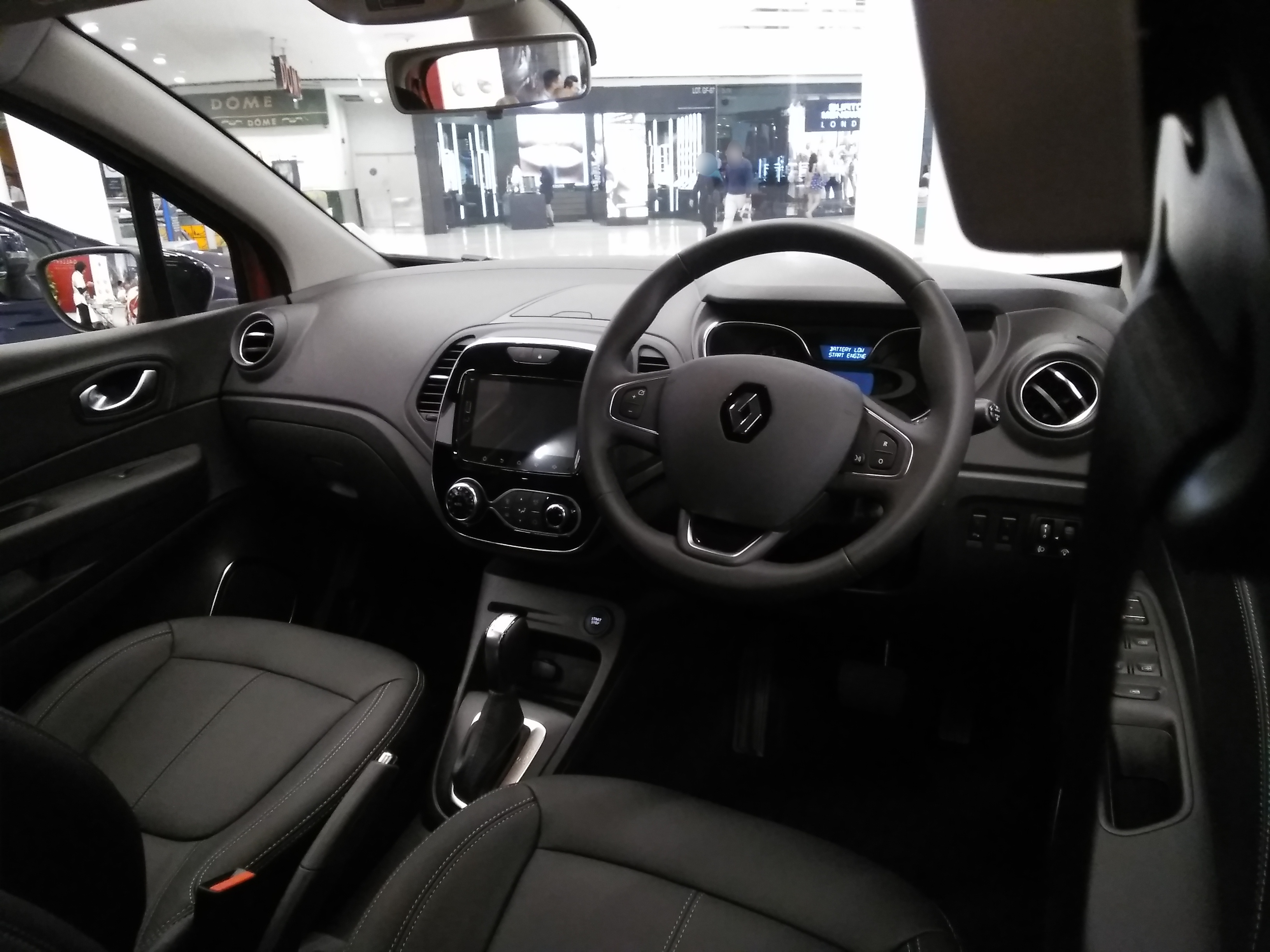
Interior

==== Engines ====
The Captur is powered by a range of petrol and diesel engines.

Engine	Code	Type	C.	Displacement	Power	Torque	0–100 km/h (0–62 mph)	Combined Consumption	CO_{2} emissions
Petrol engines
Energy TCe 90 Stop & Start	H4Bt 400	Turbo Multi-point fuel injection	3	898 cc	66 kW (90 hp) at 5,250 rpm	135 N⋅m (100 lb⋅ft) at 2,500 rpm	13 s	5 L/100 km (56 mpg_{‑imp})	115 g/km
Energy TCe 90 Stop & Start	H4Bt 408	Turbo Multi-point fuel injection	3	898 cc	66 kW (90 hp) at 5,000 rpm	135 N⋅m (100 lb⋅ft) at 2,250 rpm	13.1 s	5.1 L/100 km (55 mpg_{‑imp})	114 g/km
Energy TCe 120 Auto EDC/TCe 120 Stop & Start	H5Ft 403	Turbo direct injection	4	1,197 cc	87 kW (118 hp) at 4,900 rpm	190 N⋅m (140 lb⋅ft) at 2,000 rpm	10.9 s (AT)	5.5 L/100 km (51 mpg_{‑imp})	125 g/km
Energy TCe 120 Auto EDC/TCe 120 Stop & Start	H5Ft 412	Turbo direct injection	4	1,197 cc	87 kW (118 hp) at 5,000 rpm	205 N⋅m (151 lb⋅ft) at 2,000 rpm	9.9 s (MT); 10.6 s (AT)	5.6 L/100 km (50 mpg_{‑imp})	125 g/km
Energy TCe 150/Energy TCe 150 Auto EDC^{b}	H5Ht	Turbo direct injection	4	1,330 cc	115 kW (156 hp) at 5,500 rpm	250 N⋅m (184 lb⋅ft) at 1,600–3,600 rpm	9.8 s (MT); 9.5 s (AT)	5.4 L/100 km (52 mpg_{‑imp}) (MT); 5.3 L/100 km (53 mpg_{‑imp}) (AT)	121 g/km (MT); 118 g/km (AT)
Diesel engines
Energy dCi 90 Stop & Start	K9K 608; K9K 628	Turbo common rail injection	4	1,461 cc	66 kW (90 hp) at 4,000 rpm	220 N⋅m (162 lb⋅ft) at 1,750 rpm	13.1 s	3.7 L/100 km (76 mpg_{‑imp})	95 g/km
Energy dCi 90 Auto EDC	K9K 609	Turbo common rail injection	4	1,461 cc	66 kW (90 hp) at 4,000 rpm	220 N⋅m (162 lb⋅ft) at 1,750 rpm	13.8 s	3.9 L/100 km (72 mpg_{‑imp})	103 g/km
Energy dCi 90 Auto EDC	K9K 629	Turbo common rail injection	4	1,461 cc	66 kW (90 hp) at 4,000 rpm	220 N⋅m (162 lb⋅ft) at 1,750 rpm	13.9 s	3.9 L/100 km (72 mpg_{‑imp})	103 g/km
Energy dCi 110 Stop & Start^{a}	K9K 636	Turbo common rail injection	4	1,461 cc	81 kW (110 hp) at 4,000 rpm	260 N⋅m (192 lb⋅ft) at 1,750 rpm	11.4 s	3.9 L/100 km (72 mpg_{‑imp})	98 g/km
Notes
^{a} The Energy dCi 110 was introduced in 2015.; ^{b} The Energy TCe 150 was introduced in 2018.

==== Awards ====
The Captur won What Car? 2014 "Best Small SUV Less Than £16,000”. It was also named Voiture de l'Année 2013 (2013 Best Car) by the French Association of Automotive Press.

==== Renault Samsung QM3 ====
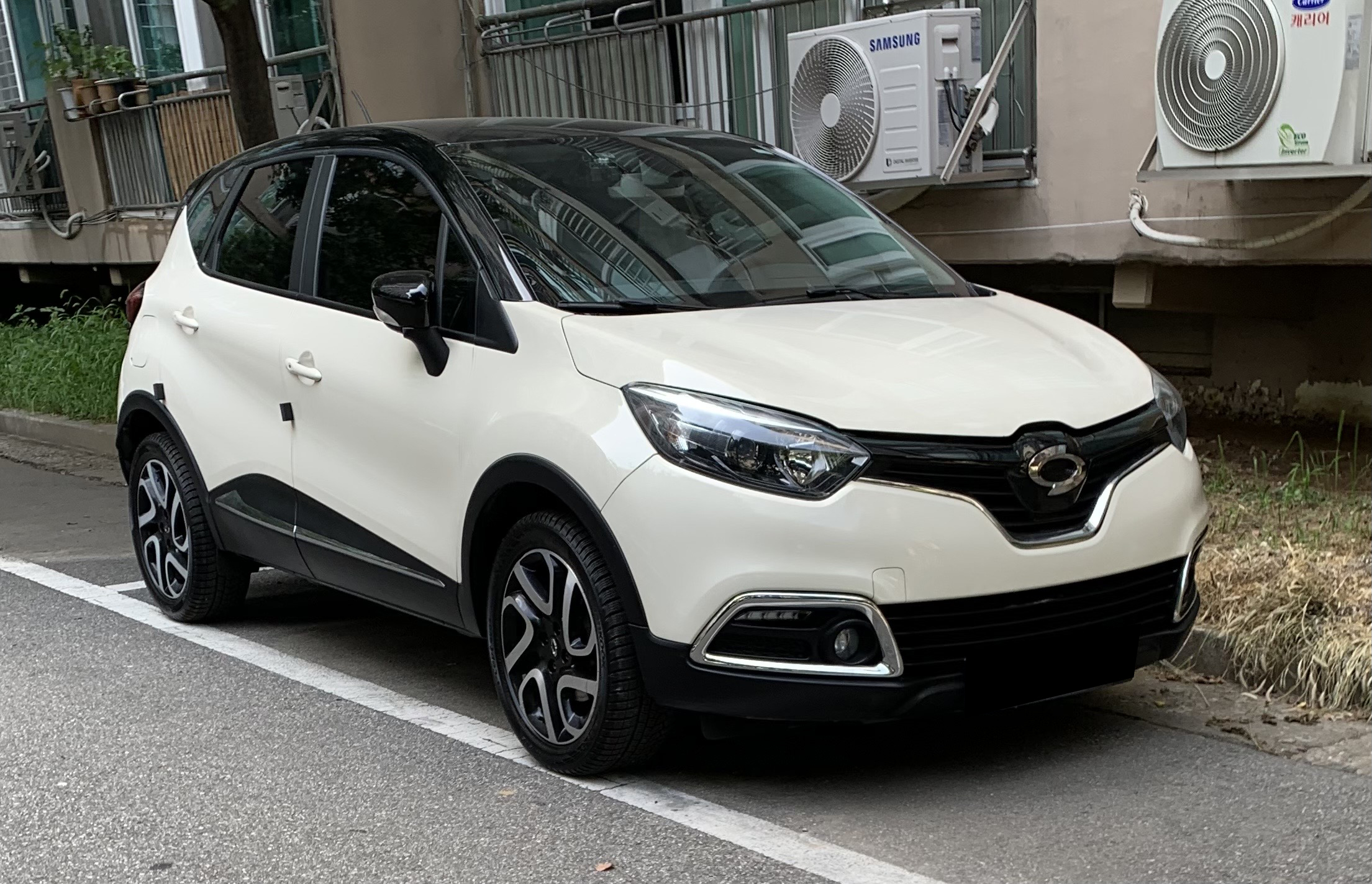
Renault Samsung QM3

The Renault Samsung QM3 is a badge engineered version of the Captur, launched in South Korea at the Seoul Motor Show in April 2013, shortly after its European counterpart was revealed at the Geneva Motor Show. The QM3 was officially released on 6 December 2013, and the initial 1,000 cars allocated to South Korea sold out within seven minutes.

The QM3's dimensions and wheelbase are identical to the Captur's, while the engine range is limited to a single dCi 90 four cylinder diesel and dual clutch transmission.

The QM3 was manufactured in the Renault Valladolid Factory, in Spain. With 24,560 vehicles registered in 2015, it was South Korea's best-selling imported car.

===== Awards =====
The QM3 was voted Best Car at the 2013 Seoul Motor Show, and was chosen 2014 "SUV of the Year" by the newspaper JoongAng Ilbo in March 2014.

=== Renault Captur/Kaptur "Global Access" (HA; 2016) ===
First generation (Global Access)
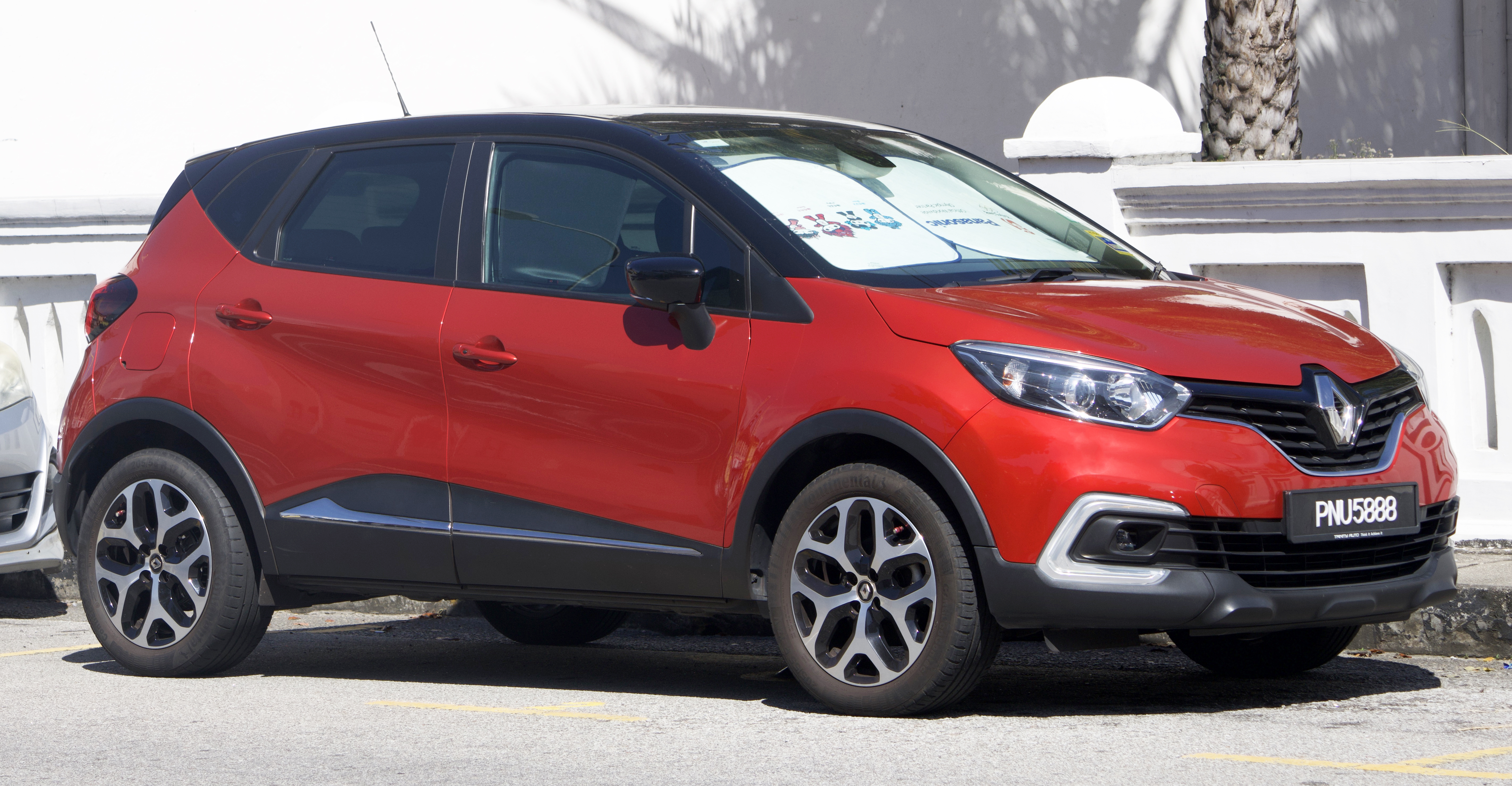

Overview
- Also called: Renault Kaptur (CIS); Renault Grand Captur (Uruguay)
- Production: 2017–2023 (Brazil); 2017–2020 (India); 2016–2022 (Russia); 2021–2022 (Kazakhstan)
- Assembly: Brazil: São José dos Pinhais (Renault Brazil); Russia: Moscow (Renault Russia); India: Chennai (Renault Nissan India); Kazakhstan: Kostanay (SaryarkaAvtoProm)

Body and chassis
- Layout: Front-engine, front-wheel-drive or four-wheel-drive
- Platform: Renault/Dacia B0 platform Renault/Dacia B0+ platform (facelift)
- Related: Dacia/Renault Duster (HS); Nissan Kicks (D15); Renault Arkana (B0)

Powertrain
- Engine: Petrol: 1.3 L H5Ht turbo I4; 1.5 L H4K I4; 1.6 L K4M 606 / K4M Hi-Flex I4; 2.0 L F4R / F4R Hi-Flex I4; Diesel: 1.5 L K9K I4
- Transmission: 5-speed manual 6-speed manual 4-speed automatic Jatco CVT7 CVT; Jatco CVT8 CVT

Dimensions
- Wheelbase: 2,673 mm (105.2 in)
- Length: 4,329–4,333 mm (170.4–170.6 in)
- Width: 1,813 mm (71.4 in)
- Height: 1,613–1,619 mm (63.5–63.7 in)

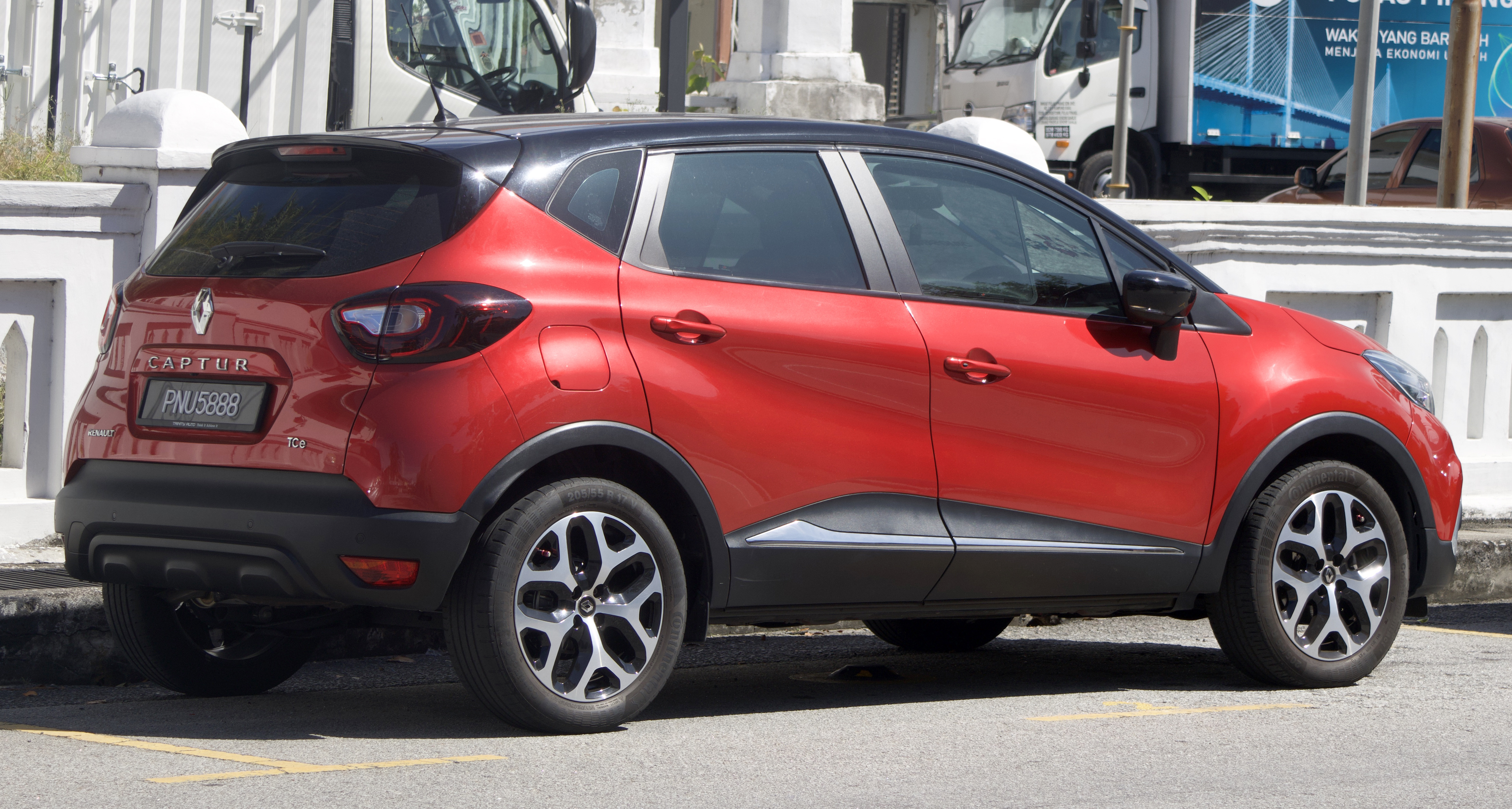
Rear view

A larger car with a similar styling as the original Captur but with a larger wheelbase and ground clearance was produced by Renault to capture emerging markets. This model was referred internally by Renault as the "Captur Global Access" (Captur GA). Compared to the B platform-based Captur, the Captur GA was cheaper to build as it is based on the first generation Dacia Duster platform instead of the fourth generation Clio, while offering larger cabin space.

==== Russia / CIS ====
The Captur GA was first introduced in Russia and neighbouring countries in 2016, badged as the Renault Kaptur. Change of the naming was explained by the difficulties of the correct pronunciation of the original "Captur" name in the Russian language. The Renault Kaptur was manufactured by the Renault Russia plant since April 2016. The front wheel drive version of this car is powered by the 1.6-litre engine and has manual gearbox or CVT, while all wheel drive versions have the 2.0-litre engine and manual or a 4-speed automatic gearbox.

Assembly in neighboring Kazakhstan began in 2021 at SaryarkaAvtoProm plant (Kostanay), through a partnership between Renault and the Allur Group.

==== Latin America ====
A localised Brazilian version was introduced in the beginning of 2017, badged as the Renault Captur. The Brazilian version has manual (five-speed), CVT and automatic (four-speed) gearboxes. That same year, the Brazilian Captur was named as Best Design by Americar (automotive press association of Latin America). The Brazilian-made Captur GA was exported throughout Latin America.

The Brazilian-made Captur GA was marketed in Uruguay since November 2017 as the Grand Captur to differentiate it with the European Captur, which was available in the country since February 2016.

In July 2021, the facelifted Captur went on sale in Brazil with a new 1.3-litre petrol engine.

After international sanctions against Russia caused by the 2022 Russian invasion of Ukraine, the production of the Brazilian model was disrupted by the lack of certain components. Late 2023, it was discontinued.

==== India ====
The car was available in the Indian market since 2017, also badged as Captur. Production and pre orders started in September 2017. It was also offered with a 1.5 L K9K diesel engine until April 2020. Advertising videos from Renault India got a negative reception in some forum and media outlets for allegedly "misinform" customers on the car awards by mentioning the ones received by the B platform version.

The Captur GA shares the platform with the Indian market Nissan Kicks (D15), which is a slightly larger version of the Nissan Kicks built on the Nissan B platform. Both are currently built at the same manufacturing plant jointly owned by Renault and Nissan in Chennai, India. The Captur GA was discontinued in India in 2020 due to lacklustre sales, with less than 7,000 units produced in 4 years.

==== Facelift ====
In May 2020, Renault Russia launched the facelifted Kaptur. Apart from several subtle exterior and interior updates, the car was engineered on the B0+ platform instead of the B0 for better ride quality, resulting in more than 55 percent components being updated. The hydraulic power steering was ditched in favour of the modern electric power steering, which in turn allowed the steering column to be adjusted for reach. The Kaptur received a new 1.3 L H5Ht petrol turbo engine, replacing the 2.0 L F4R naturally aspirated petrol engine.

==== Engines ====
Initially, the B0 model did not have diesel engines. It mounts engines either burning petrol (for Russia-assembled vehicles) or a mix of petrol/ethanol (for Brazil-assembled vehicles). The India-assembled Captur had a diesel engine as an option.

Engine	Type	C.	Displacement	Power	Torque
Petrol engines
1.3 petrol^{1}	Direct injection	4	1,332 cc	150 hp (110 kW)	
1.5 petrol^{2}	Direct injection	4	1,498 cc	106 hp (78 kW) at 5,600 rpm	142 N⋅m (105 lb⋅ft) at 4,000 rpm
1.6 petrol^{1}	Direct injection	4	1,598 cc	114 hp (84 kW) at 5,500 rpm	156 N⋅m (115 lb⋅ft) at 4,000 rpm
2.0 petrol^{1}	Direct injection	4	1,998 cc	143 hp (105 kW) at 5,750 rpm	195 N⋅m (144 lb⋅ft) at 4,000 rpm
Petrol/ethanol engines (Brazil)
1.3 TCe petrol/ethanol^{3}	Direct injection	4	1,332 cc	167 hp (123 kW) at 5,500 rpm^{a}; 160 hp (118 kW) at 5,500 rpm^{b}	270 N⋅m; 199 lb⋅ft (27.5 kg⋅m) at 1600 rpm
1.6 petrol/ethanol	Direct injection	4	1,597 cc	118 hp (87 kW) at 5,500 rpm^{b}; 120 hp (88 kW) at 5,500 rpm^{a}	159 N⋅m; 117 lb⋅ft (16.2 kg⋅m) at 4,000 rpm
2.0 petrol/ethanol	Direct injection	4	1,998 cc	143 hp (105 kW) at 5,750 rpm^{b}; 148 hp (109 kW) at 5,750 rpm^{a}	198 N⋅m; 146 lb⋅ft (20.2 kg⋅m) at 4,000 rpm^{b}; 205 N⋅m; 151 lb⋅ft (20.9 kg⋅m) at 4,000 rpm^{a}
Diesel engines
1.5 diesel^{1}	Turbo common rail injection	4	1,461 cc	110 hp (81 kW) at 4,000 rpm	240 N⋅m (177 lb⋅ft) at 1,750 rpm
Notes
^{1} Available on the Russian version.; ^{2} Available on the Indian version.; ^{3} Available on the Brazilian version.; ^{a} Estimated using ethanol.; ^{b} Estimated using petrol.

==== Safety ====
It has ventilated front disc brakes and rear drum brakes.

===== Latin NCAP =====
The car got a 4-star safety rating for adults and 3 stars for infants in the 2017 Latin NCAP 2.0 tests.

Latin NCAP 2.0 test results Renault Captur + 4 Airbags (2017, based on Euro NCAP 2008)
Test	Points	Stars
Adult occupant:	30.27/34.0	4 /5 stars
Child occupant:	33.68/49.00	3 /5 stars

== Second generation (JB/JE; 2019) ==
Second generation
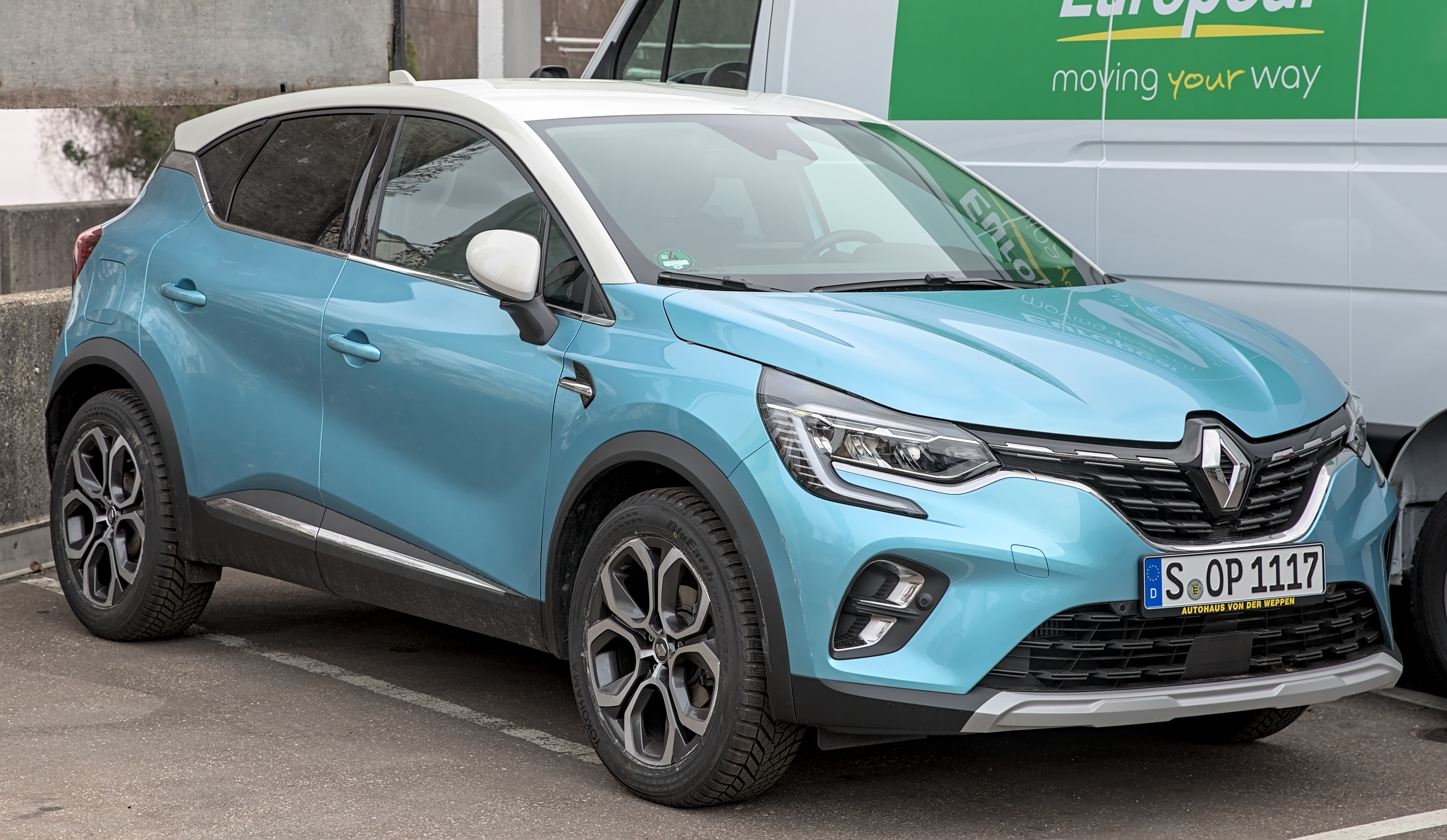

Overview
- Model code: XJB * HJB * HJE
- Also called: Mitsubishi ASX (2023–present)
- Production: 2019–present
- Assembly: Spain: Valladolid (Renault Spain); China: Wuhan (Dongfeng Renault until 2020)
- Designer: Pierre Sabas (exterior; 2018); Under the lead of Laurens van den Acker

Body and chassis
- Layout: Front-engine, front-wheel-drive
- Platform: Renault–Nissan CMF-B HS platform
- Related: Renault Symbioz; Renault Clio V; Renault Arkana (CMF-B); Nissan Juke (F16)

Powertrain
- Engine: Petrol: 1.0 L H4Bt tCe I3; 1.2 L HR12 tCe I3; 1.3 L H5Ht tCe I4; Petrol hybrid: 1.6 L H4M I4 (E-Tech Hybrid; 2020–2024); 1.8 L Horse HR18 HEV I4 (E-Tech Hybrid; 2025–present); Diesel: 1.5 L K9K Blue dCi turbo I4 (2019–2020); Petrol plug-in hybrid: 1.6 L H4M I4 (E-Tech Plug-In Hybrid; 2020–2022)
- Electric motor: 2x PMSM's (E-Tech Hybrid & E-Tech PHEV)
- Power output: List: 66 kW (90 PS; 89 hp); 85 kW (116 PS; 114 hp); 103 kW (140 PS; 138 hp); 117 kW (159 PS; 157 hp); 107 kW (145 PS; 143 hp); 147 kW (200 PS; 197 hp)
- Transmission: 6-speed manual 7-speed Getrag EDC automatic Jatco CVT automatic 6-speed clutchless automatic (E-Tech); E-TECH multi-mode automatic transmission with 15 combinations (E-Tech PHEV)
- Hybrid drivetrain: Power-split hybrid; Plug-in hybrid
- Battery: 1.3 kWh Li-ion (E-Tech hybrid until 2024); 1.3 kWh Li-ion (E-Tech hybrid 2025–present); 10.5 kWh Li-ion (PHEV)

Dimensions
- Wheelbase: 2,639 mm (103.9 in)
- Length: 4,228 mm (166.5 in)
- Width: 1,797 mm (70.7 in)
- Height: 1,566 mm (61.7 in)

The second-generation Captur debuted in July 2019. It is based on the newer CMF-B platform which also underpin the Clio V, the second-generation Nissan Juke and the European-spec Arkana. The second-generation Captur is around 110 mm (4.3 in) longer than the outgoing model, which is complemented with 20 mm (0.8 in) longer wheelbase.

At launch, Renault announced a total of 11 exterior colours, 4 contrasting roof colours, and 3 customization packages available for the European market, resulting in 90 possible colour schemes.

The vehicle available with 1.0- and 1.3-litre petrol engines with power ranging from 100 to 155 PS (99 to 153 hp; 74 to 114 kW). The base engine is also available out of the factory with a dual-fuel LPG system. The sole diesel engine option is a 1.5-litre dCi unit in with 95 PS (94 hp; 70 kW) or 115 PS (113 hp; 85 kW). From 2020, the new Captur is available with a plug-in hybrid powertrain dubbed as the E-Tech which is capable of 45 km (28 mi) of pure electric range in mixed use. The tech features over 150 new patents from Renault.

Top-spec versions is equipped with a 9.3-inch vertically mounted touchscreen infotainment system, and a 10.2-inch digital instrument cluster screen (OpenR Link). Lower trim levels have a 7.0-inch touchscreen and a 7.0-inch instrument display.

In South Korea, the model is sold with its international Captur name from the first half of 2020, instead of being rebadged as the Renault Samsung QM3 as with the previous generation.

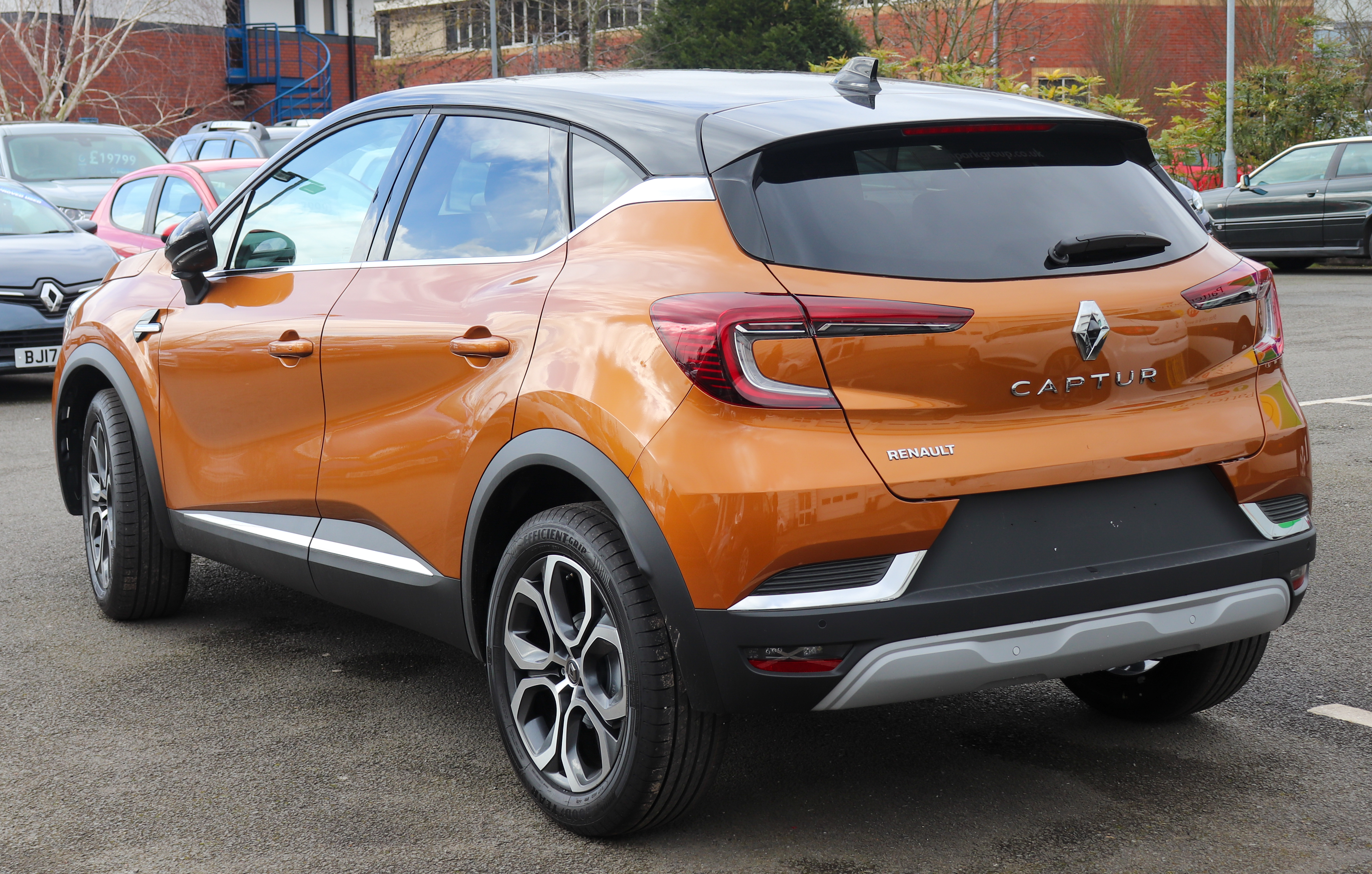
2020 Renault Captur S Edition (UK)

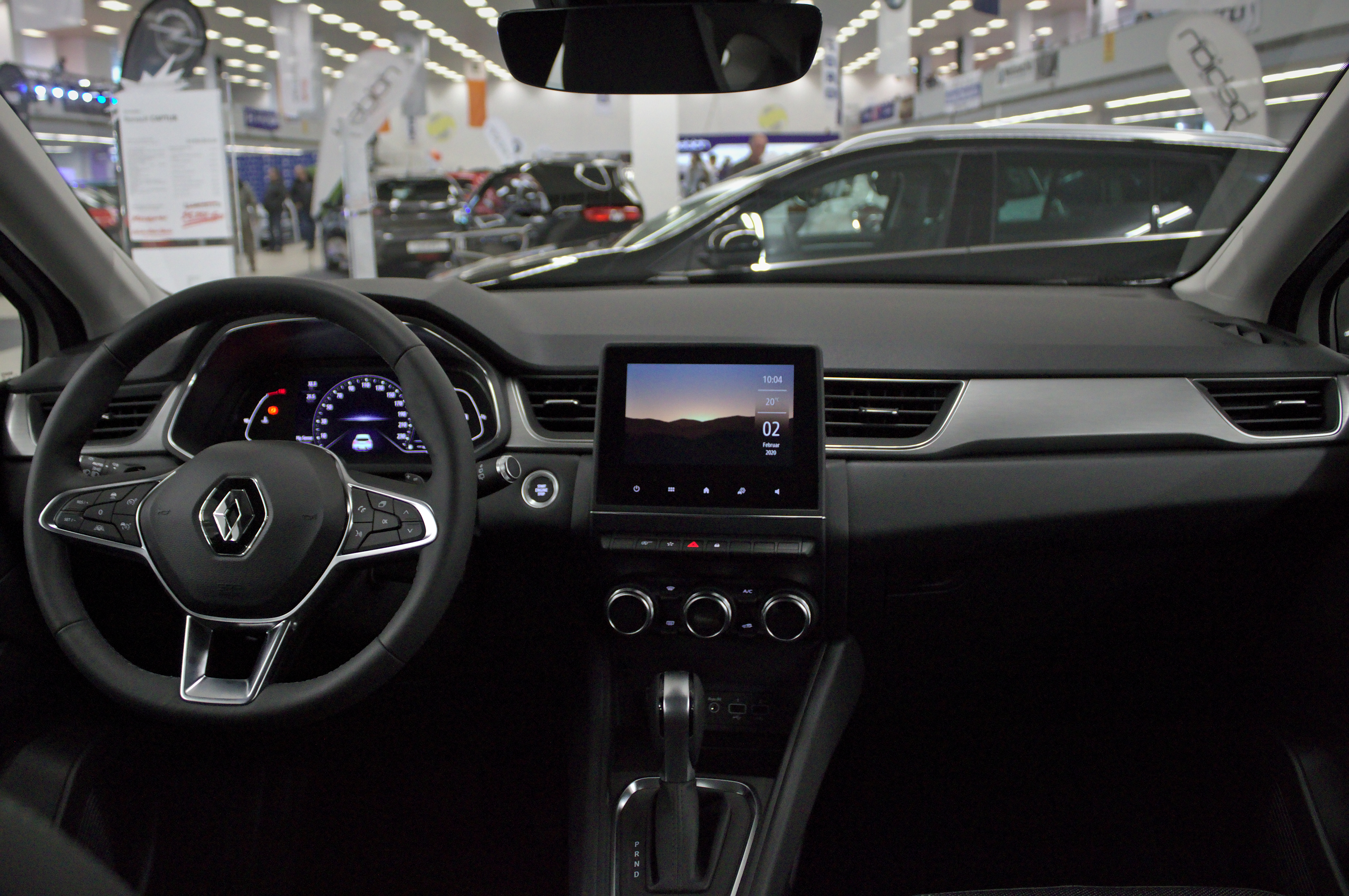
Interior

=== Facelift ===
The facelifted Captur was revealed on 4 April 2024 changes include: a restyled front fascia, new taillight graphics, the inclusion of the latest logo from Renault, removal of faux exhaust trim, leather and chrome materials removed in place for recyclable materials, a larger size for the digital instrument cluster and touchscreen information, and a new Esprit Alpine as the flagship trim replaced the RS Line.

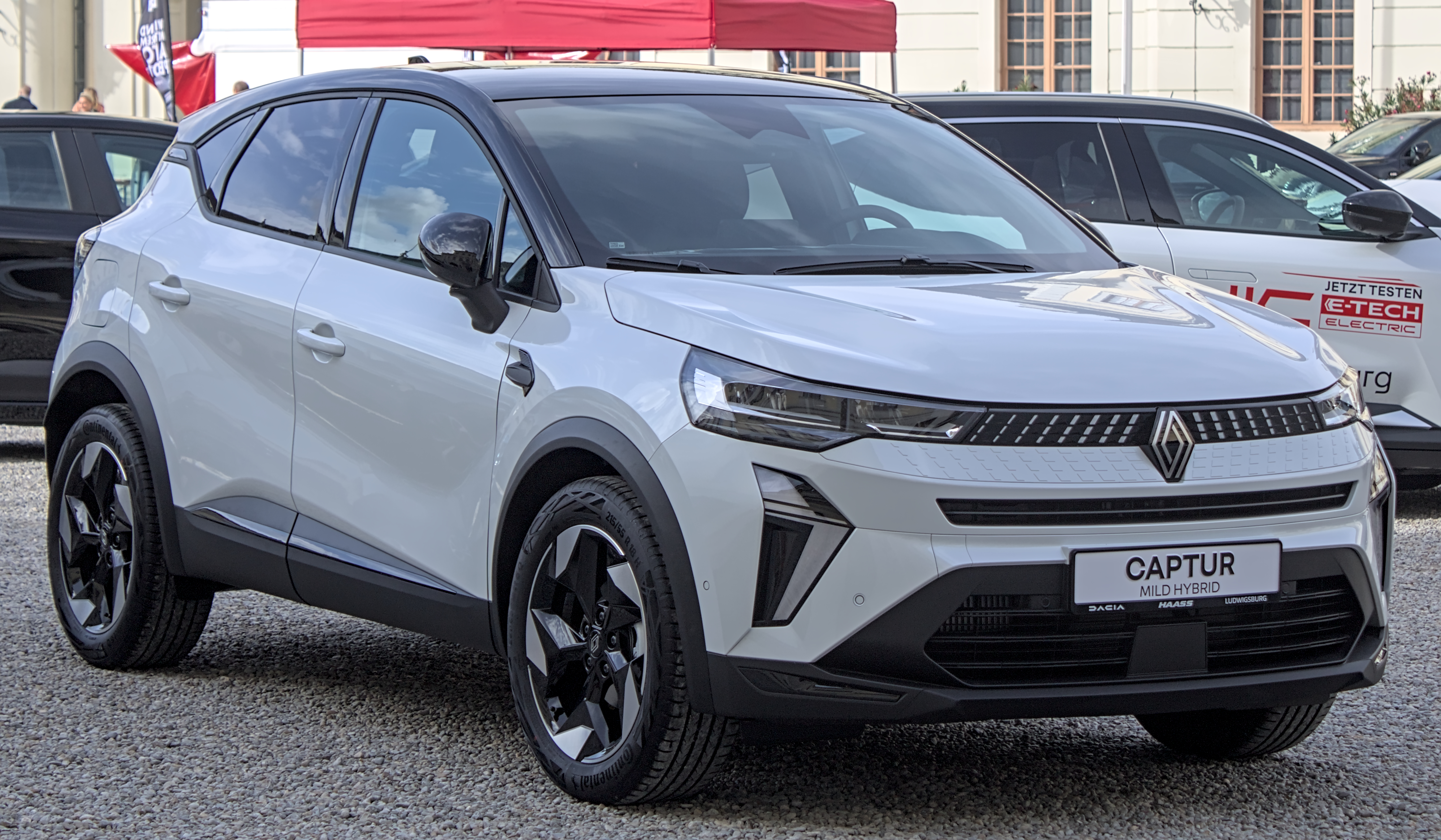
2024 Captur (facelift)

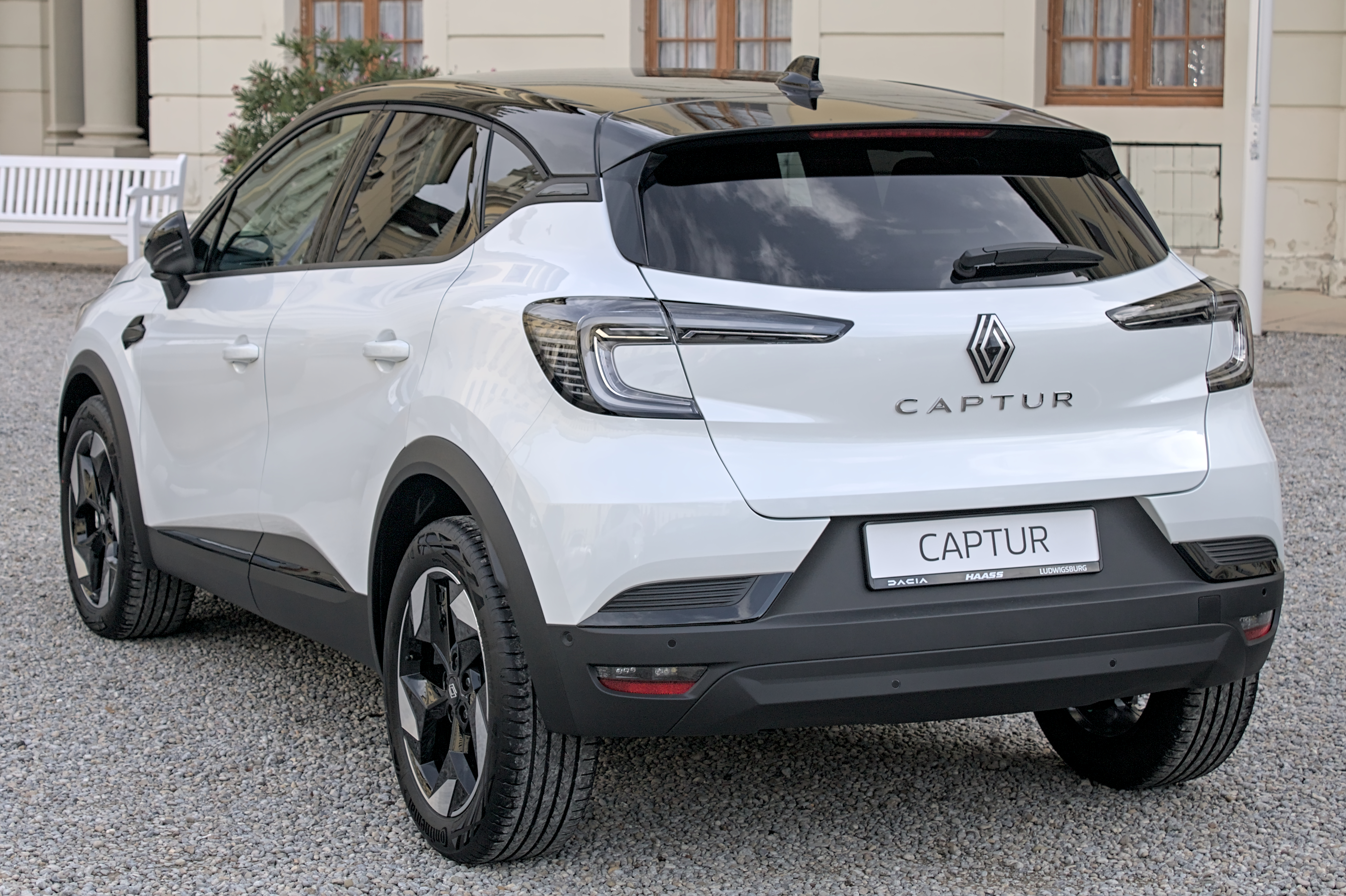
Rear view

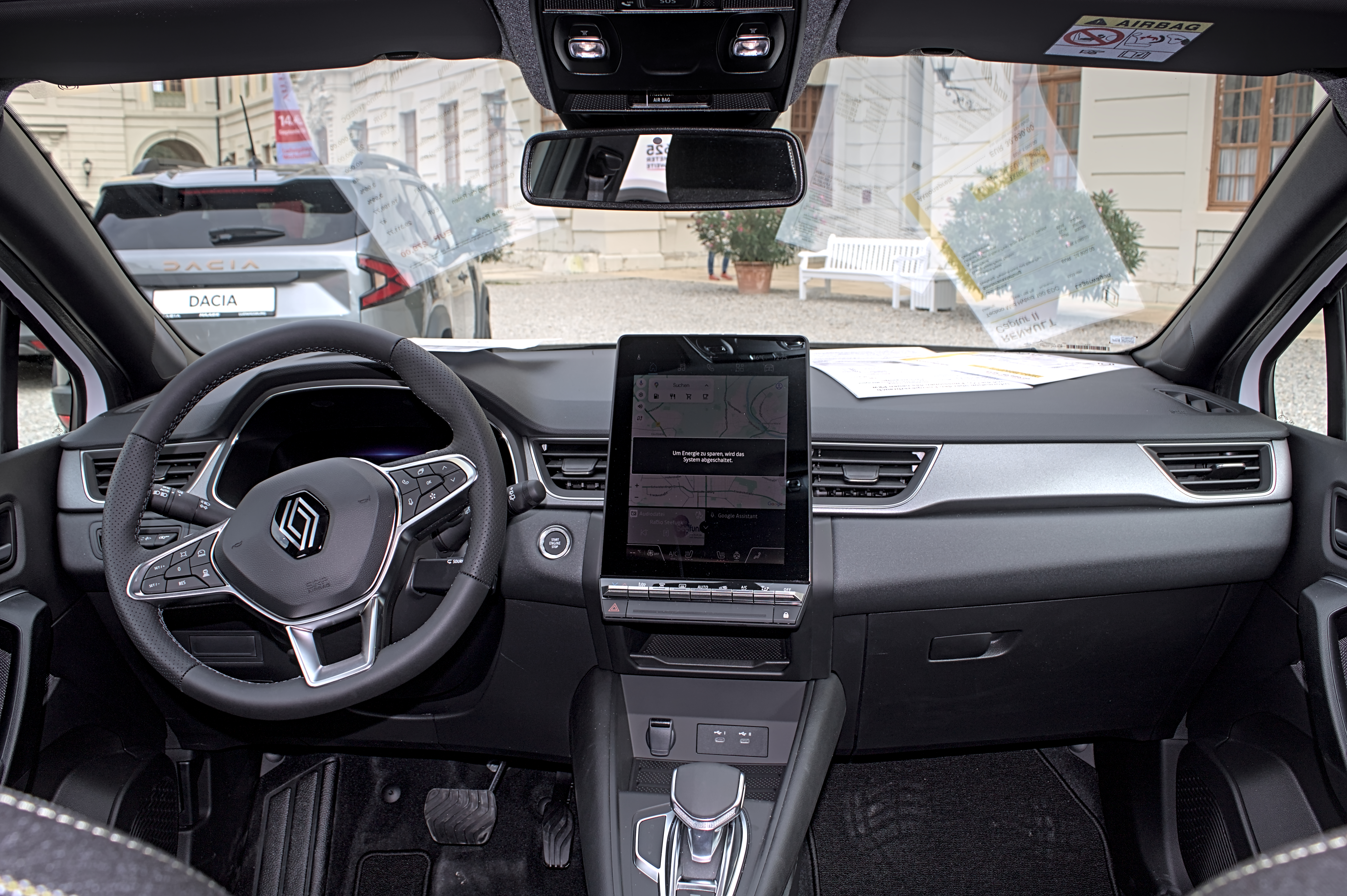
Interior

=== Mitsubishi ASX ===
In September 2022, Mitsubishi Motors released the second-generation Mitsubishi ASX for the European market, which is a rebadged Captur. It went on sale in March 2023 with five powertrain options from the Captur, ranging from petrol, mild hybrid, full hybrid and plug-in hybrid. The facelifted version will also be launched in the Australian market in 2025, being sold alongside the existing Captur.

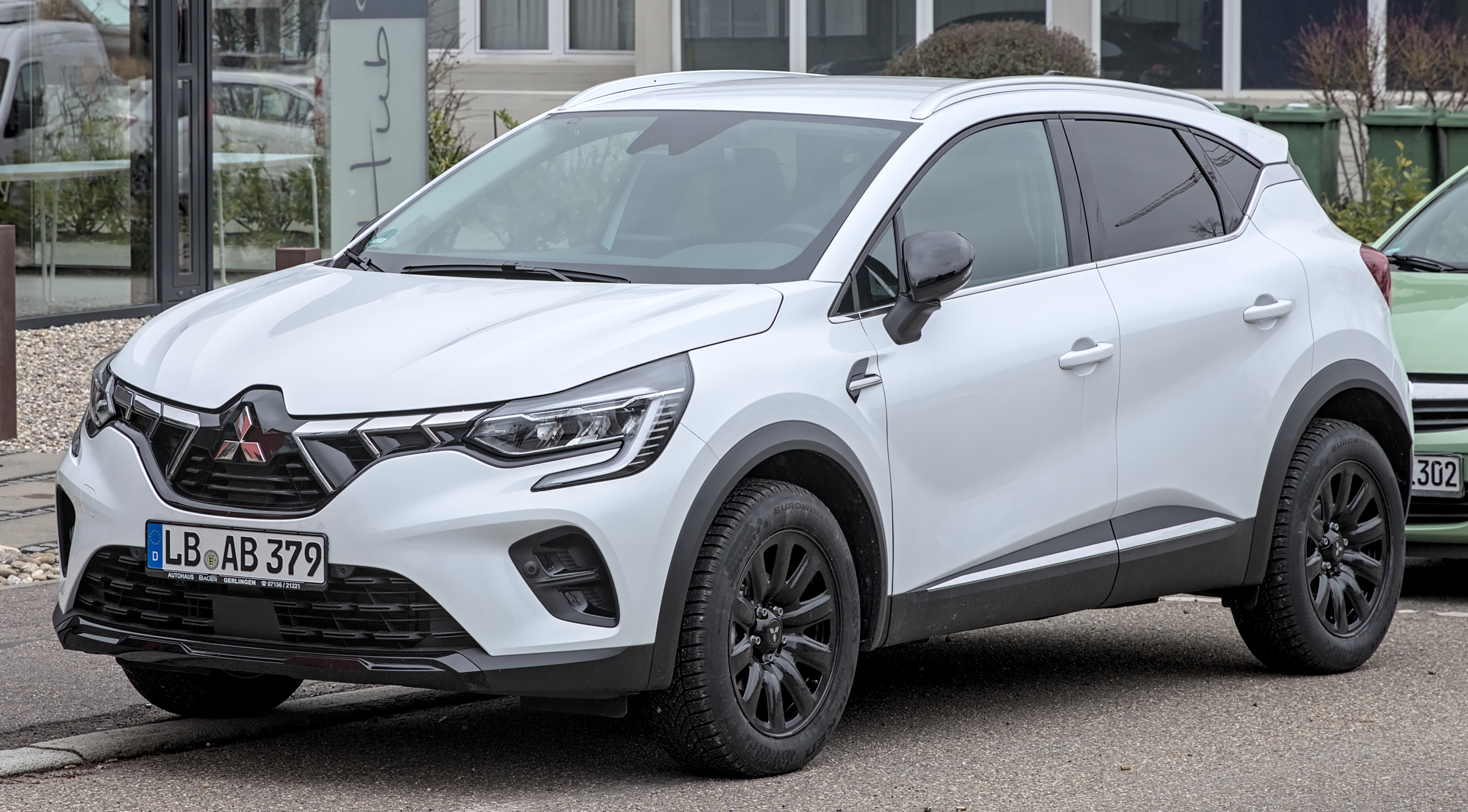
Mitsubishi ASX

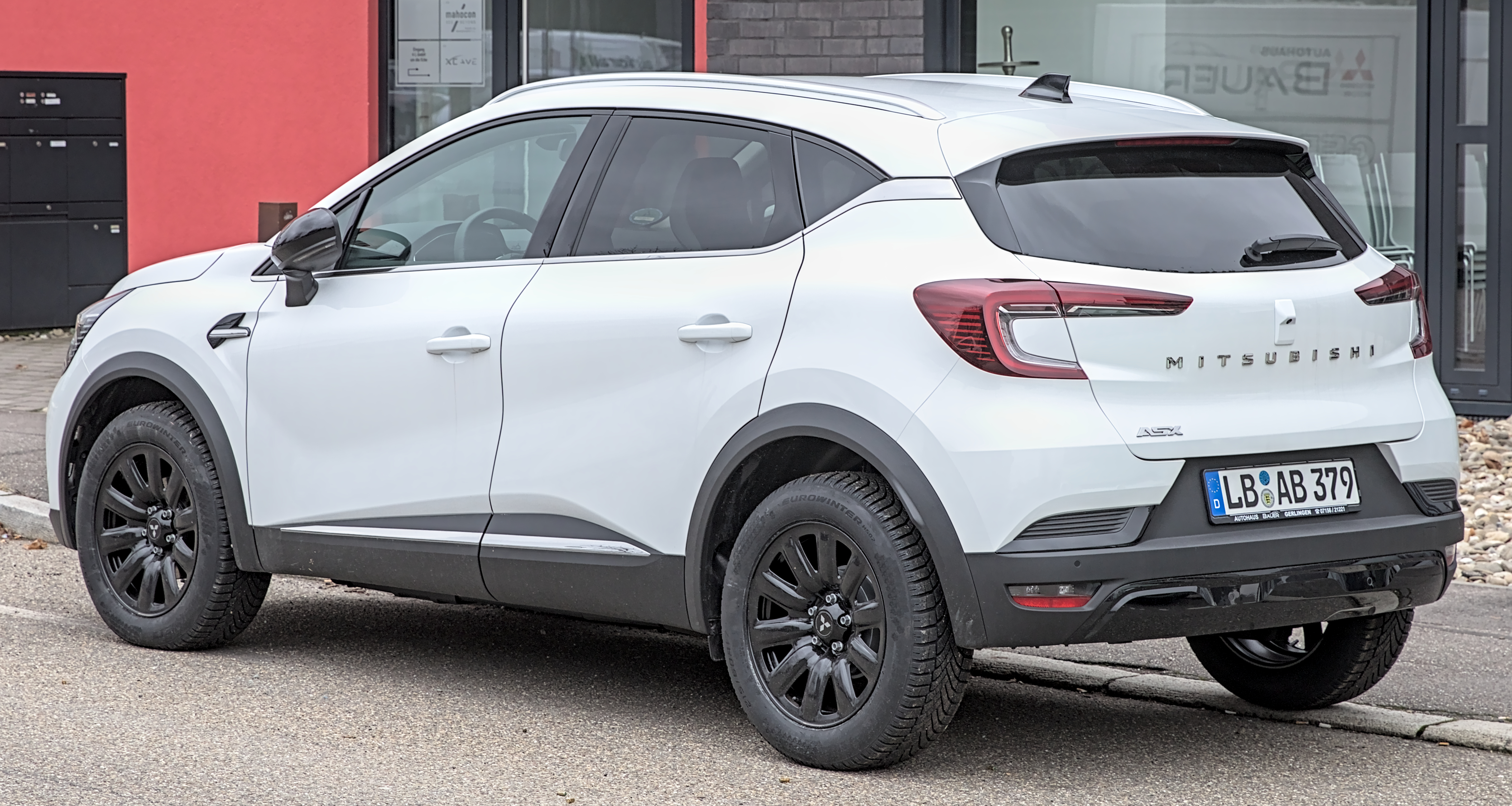
Rear view

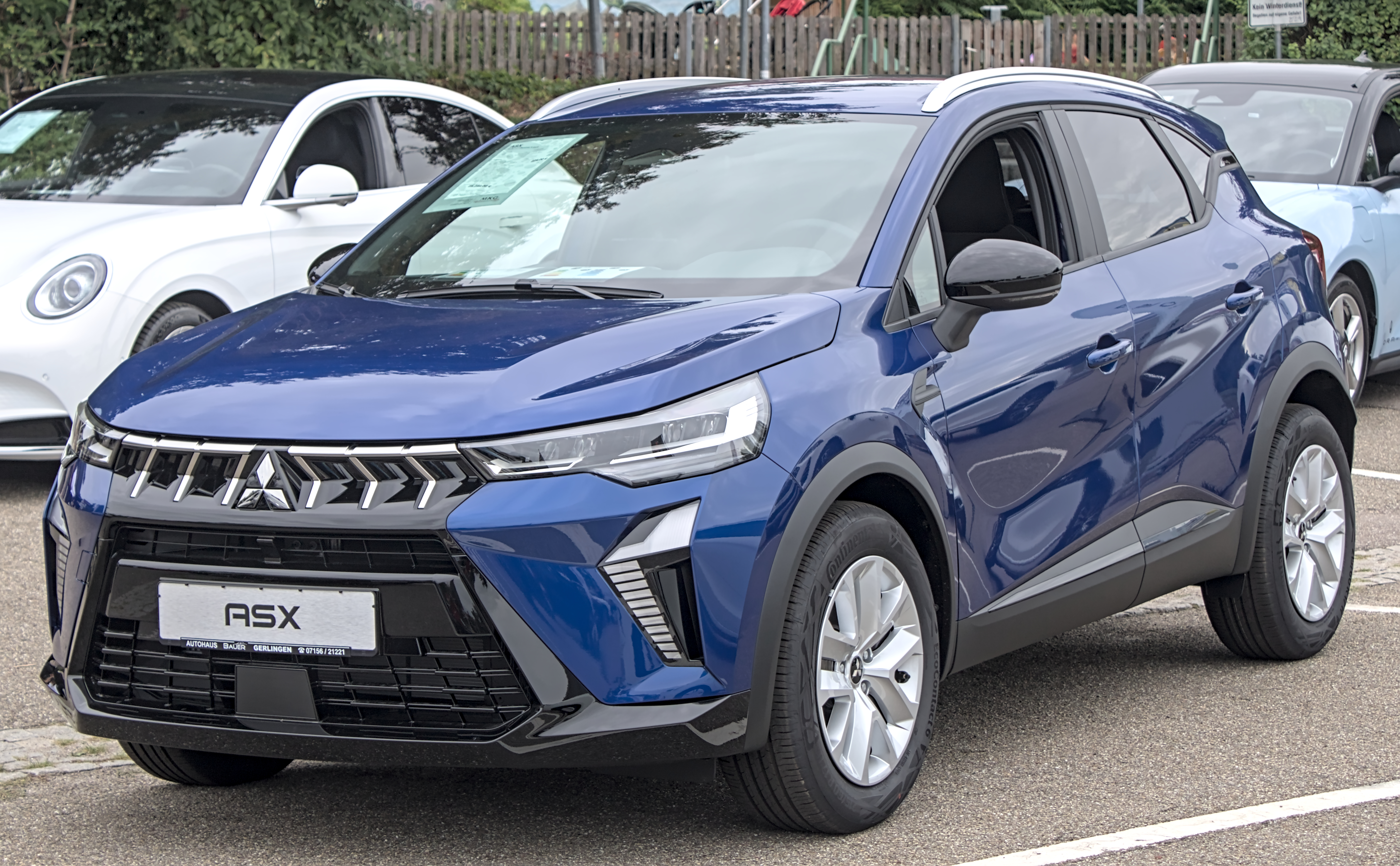
Facelift

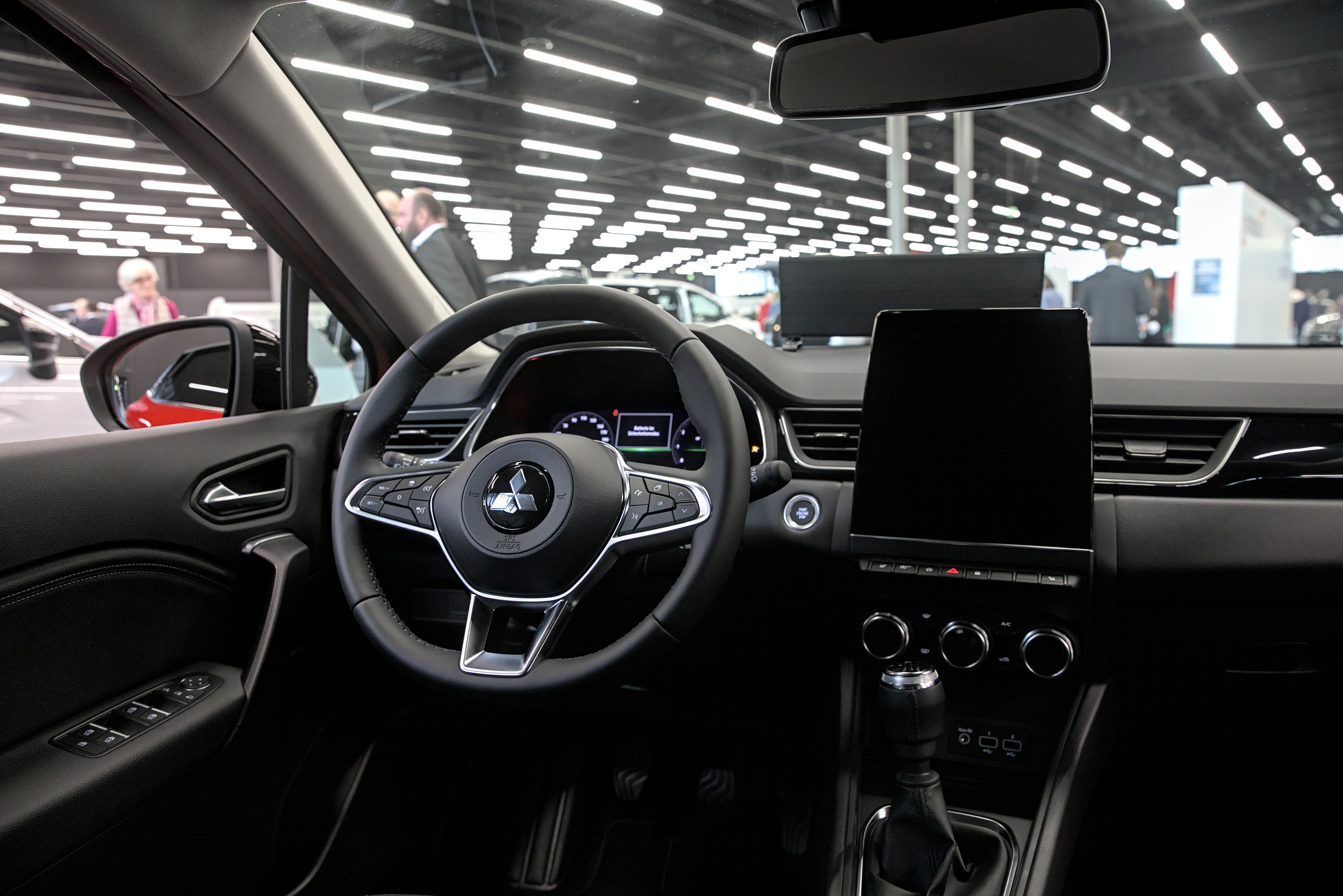
Interior

=== Safety ===
Euro NCAP test results* Renault Captur 1.0 TCe (LHD) (2019)
Test	Points	%
Overall:	4 /5 stars	
Adult occupant:	36.8	96%
Child occupant:	41	83%
Pedestrian:	36.1	75%
Safety assist:	9.6	74%

ANCAP test results* Renault Captur (2019, aligned with Euro NCAP)
Test	Points	%
Overall:	5 /5 stars	
Adult occupant:	36.8	96%
Child occupant:	41.1	84%
Pedestrian:	36.1	75%
Safety assist:	9.1	70%

== Captur concept ==
A concept car named Renault Captur was unveiled by Renault at the 2011 Geneva Motor Show. It was shown with the Renault Samsung badge at the 2012 Busan Motor Show.

The Captur is a mini SUV, and it is the second of six concept cars showing Renaults future design directions. The first was the Renault DeZir. It was designed by Julio Lozano under the leadership of Renault's design chief Laurens Van den Acker.

=== Technical details ===
It is said to be based on the same platform as its partner Nissan's Juke. The Captur is powered by a twin-turbocharged version of the 1.6 L dCi "Energy" engine which will be rolled out among Renault and Nissan models during 2011. The engine produces 158 bhp (118 kW; 160 PS) and 280 lb⋅ft (380 N⋅m) of torque, and the Captur can accelerate from 0-62 mph (100 km/h) in 8.0 seconds a low 99 g/km of CO_{2} emission figure and a top speed of 130 mph (209.2 km/h).

The car is made from carbon fibre, has butterfly doors and has a removable roof. It weighs 1,300 kg (2,866 lb) and features large 22 inch wheels. Despite its crossover appearance, the Captur is front-wheel drive and features Renault's new 'RX2’ mechanical self-locking differential to transfer the available torque to the driven wheel with the most grip.

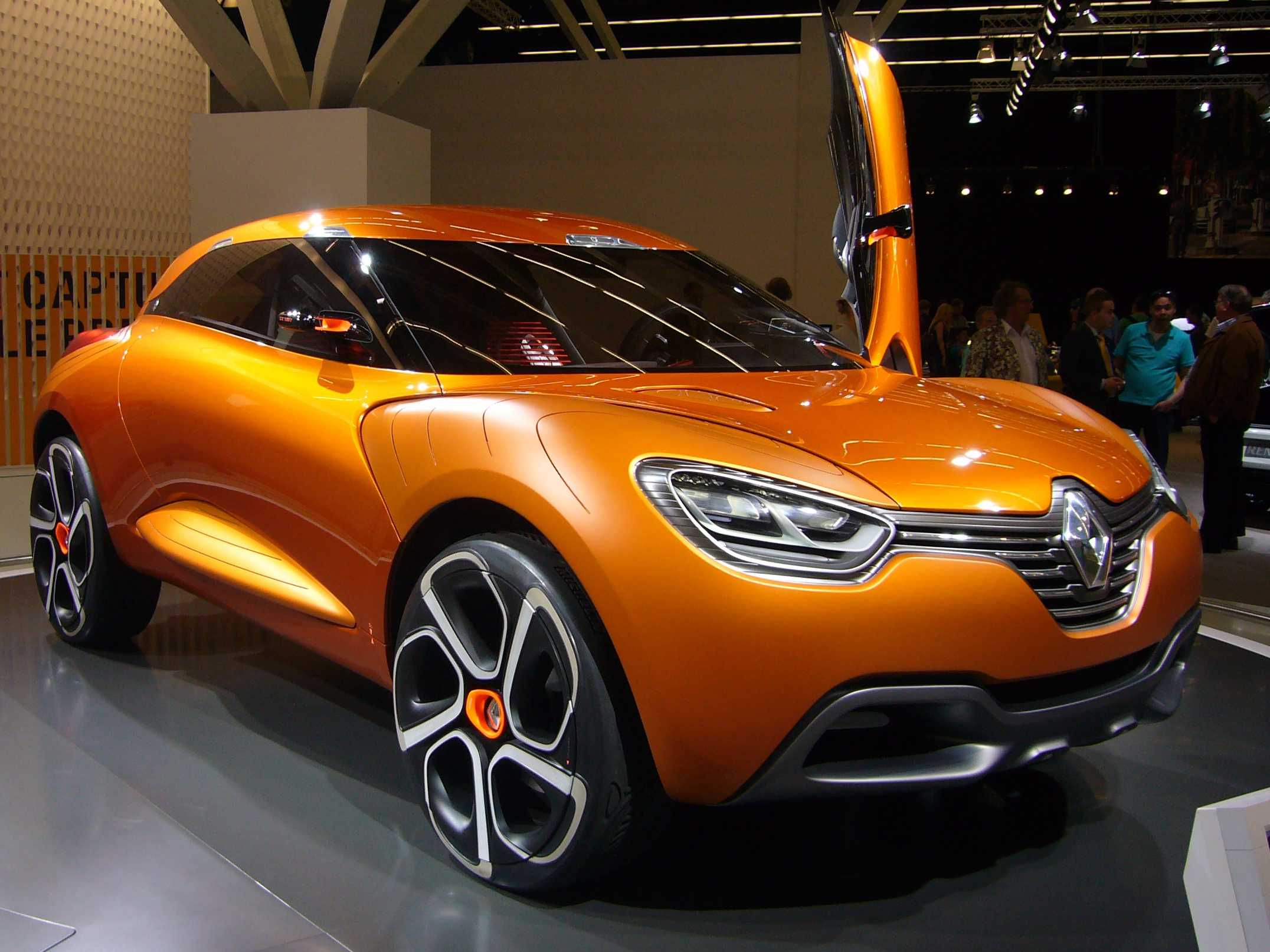
Renault Captur Concept

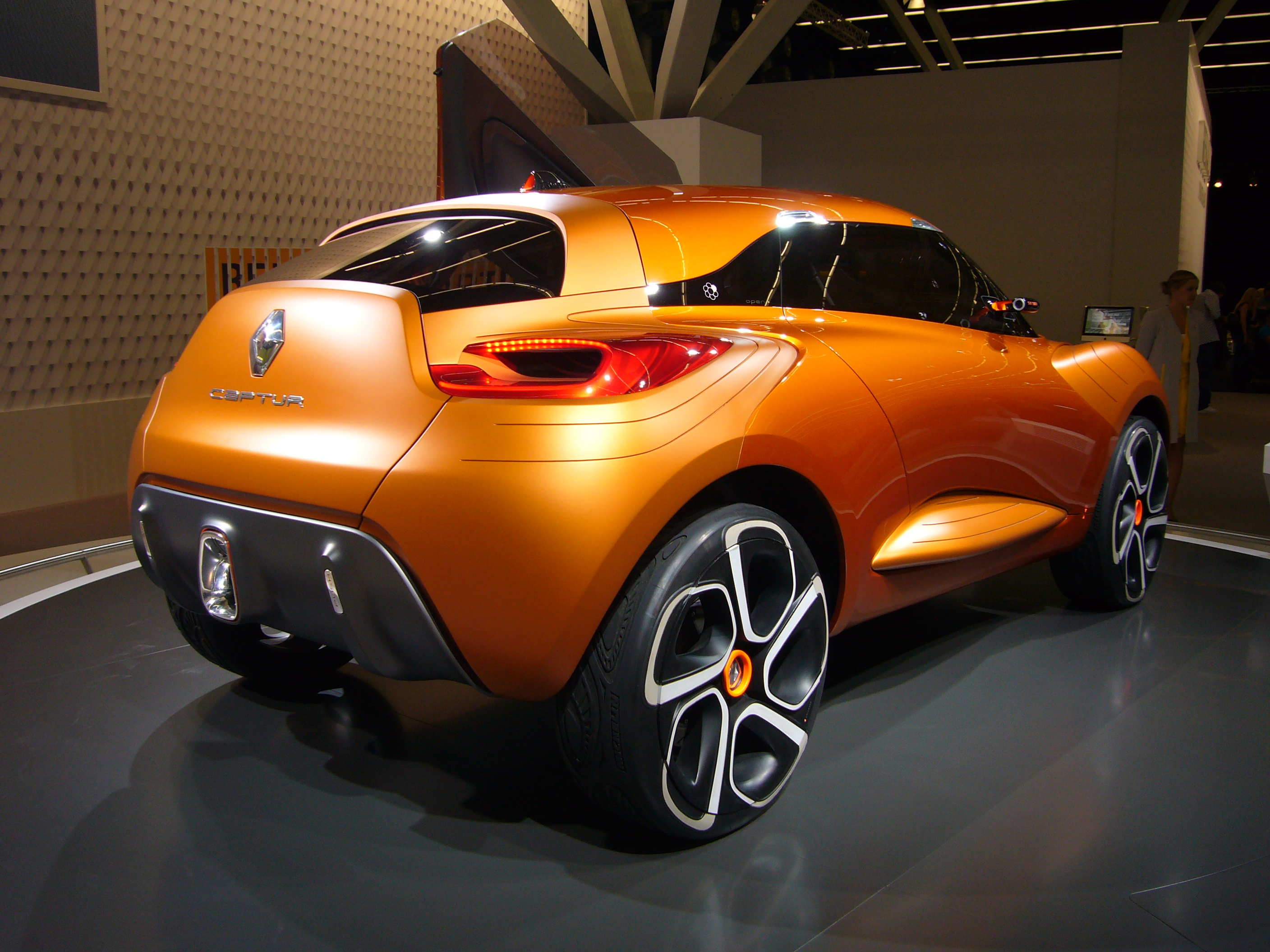
Renault Captur Concept rear view

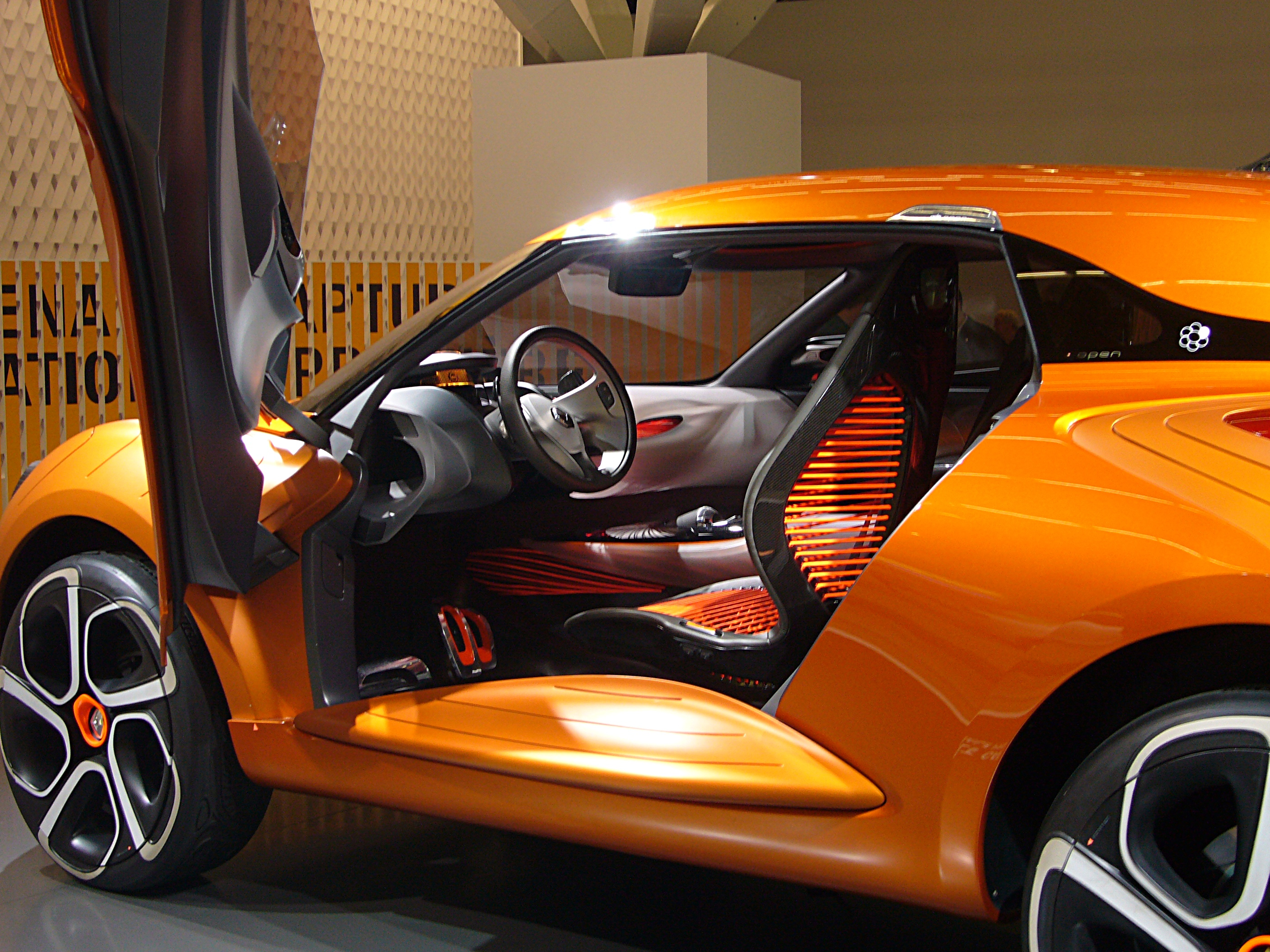
Interior

== Sales ==
Despite being on the market for less than a full year, it managed to rank third in the European small crossover segment for 2013, with just over 84,000 sales, behind the Nissan Juke and the Dacia Duster, and it was the segment's best seller in the last quarter of 2013.

At the end of 2015, Renault Captur was ranked 14th out of the 20 most sold cars in Europe with 195,323 units.

Calendar Year	Regional sales						Global sales	
Calendar Year	Europe	South Korea	Brazil	Argentina	Russia	Australia	Captur	Captur GA
2013	84,085							
2014	164,801	18,191						
2015	194,847	24,560				1,614		
2016	215,493	15,301		341		1,563	243,797	15,160
2017	211,321	12,228	13,742	8,155	30,966	377	232,733	62,147
2018	211,092	6,367	26,504	9,252	30,042	457	230,070	78,907
2019	222,540	4,702	28,660	5,852	25,799	484	239,332	69,812
2020	178,724	2,283	10,872	3,807	20,284	33	188,065	40,393
2021	162,138		8,306	1,613		533	171,543	33,811
2022	135,284		3,007	1,343				
2023			356					
2024			11					
