= Valladolid Automotive Plants =

Automotive plants in Castile and León, Spain

Valladolid Motores/Valladolid Carroserie Montage
- Built: 1953
- Location: Valladolid, Castile and León, Spain
- Coordinates: 41.60°N 4.72°W
- Industry: Automotive
- Products: Automobiles, engines
- Area: 150 hectares (370 acres)
- Address: Factoría Carrocería Montaje Valladolid Renault España S.A./Valladolid Motores Renault España S.A., Carretera de Madrid Km. 185, 47008 Valladolid, Spain

The Valladolid Automotive Plants are a cluster of three automotive plants in Valladolid, Castile and León, in northwestern Spain. Two of the plants are operated by Renault España, with the third operated by Horse Powertrain.

== History ==
In response to Spanish government limits on imports of completed cars, Renault established in 1951 the Spanish FASA (Fabricacion de Automoviles SA) company which built a plant at Valladolid for the assembly of Renault 4CV cars using components imported from France. In 1953, the first year of production, 707 cars emerged from the plant. By 1958, annual output had risen to 7,547 units.

The company first produced complete engines in Spain in 1961: by this time the principal model produced at Valladolid was the Dauphine. Production levels continued increasing, with the plant producing 14,537 Dauphines in 1961.

1965 saw the amalgamation of the production business, FASA, with Renault's Spanish distribution company, SAEAR (Société Anonyme Espagnole des Automobiles Renault), which had originally been created in 1908 to distribute cars imported from France, long before import restrictions persuaded the company to create its assembly facility at Valladolid.

By 1971, production had increased to 110,255 vehicles, including most of the company's smaller mainstream models such as the Renault 8 and Renault 4. The Renault 5 was added to the plant's production line in 1972, triggering a further expansion of FASA output. By the 1970s, Spain was firmly established as the second largest market for Renault cars after France, and paved the way for Ford to open a new factory at Valencia in 1976, and Opel to build a factory at Zaragoza in 1982, while Volkswagen began building cars in SEAT factories after taking over the former Spanish division of Fiat.

As of 2014, the plant produces the Captur and the Twizy. It manufactured 124,944 cars and 1,247,579 engines in 2013.

In 2023, the plant's engine and powertrain production facilities were transferred to Horse Powertrain, a Geely-Renault joint venture which independently spun out the combustion and hybrid powertrain capabilities of both organizations. As part of this change, the Horse-owned section of the plant was renamed the Valladolid Motores Plant. Renault retained control of the sections of the plant that were dedicated to producing batteries, bumpers, stamped/welded parts and plastic injected parts (renamed the Valladolid Bodyworks Plant), and of final vehicle assembly (renamed the Valladolid Assembly Plant).
