= Dacia Logan =

Subcompact car produced by Renault and its Dacia subsidiary

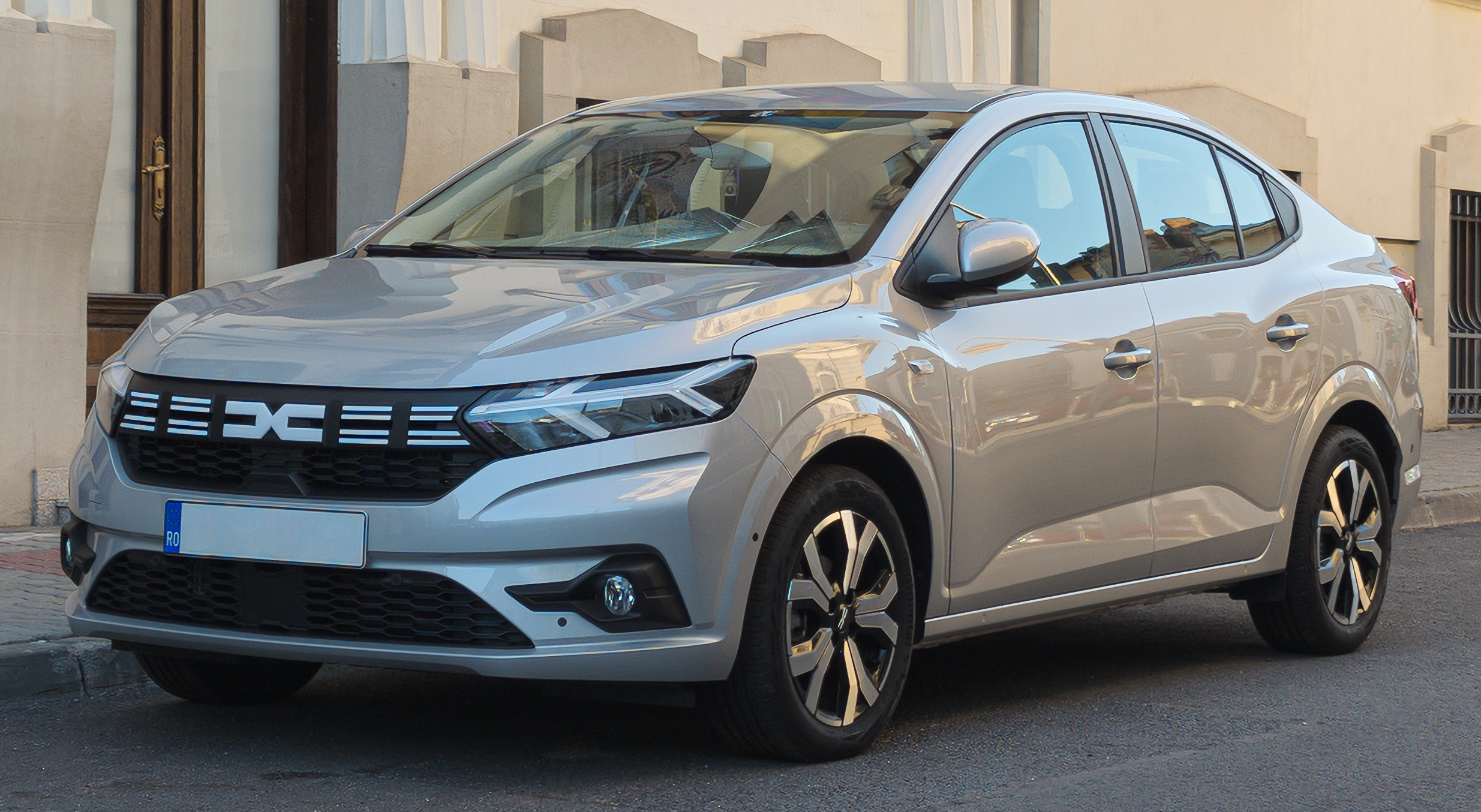

Overview
- Manufacturer: Dacia (Renault)
- Production: 2004–present

Body and chassis
- Class: Subcompact car (B)
- Layout: Front-engine, front-wheel-drive

Chronology
- Predecessor: Dacia 1310; Dacia Solenza

The Dacia Logan is a family of automobiles produced and marketed jointly by the French manufacturer Renault and its Romanian subsidiary Dacia since mid-2004, and was the successor to the Dacia 1310 and Dacia Solenza. It has been produced as a sedan, station wagon, and as a pick-up. It has been manufactured at Dacia's automobile plant in Mioveni, Romania, and at Renault (or its partners') plants in Morocco, Argentina, Turkey, Russia, Colombia, Iran and India. The pick-up has also been produced at Nissan's plant in Rosslyn, South Africa.

It has also been marketed as the Renault Logan, Nissan Aprio, Mahindra Verito, Renault L90, Lada Largus (the MCV), Nissan NP200 (the pick-up), Renault Symbol (Mk3), Renault Taliant, and as the Renault Tondar 90 depending on the existing presence or positioning of the Renault brand.

Since its launch, the Dacia Logan was estimated to have reached over 4 million sales worldwide as of 2018.

== First generation (L90/U90/F90; 2004) ==
Logan I
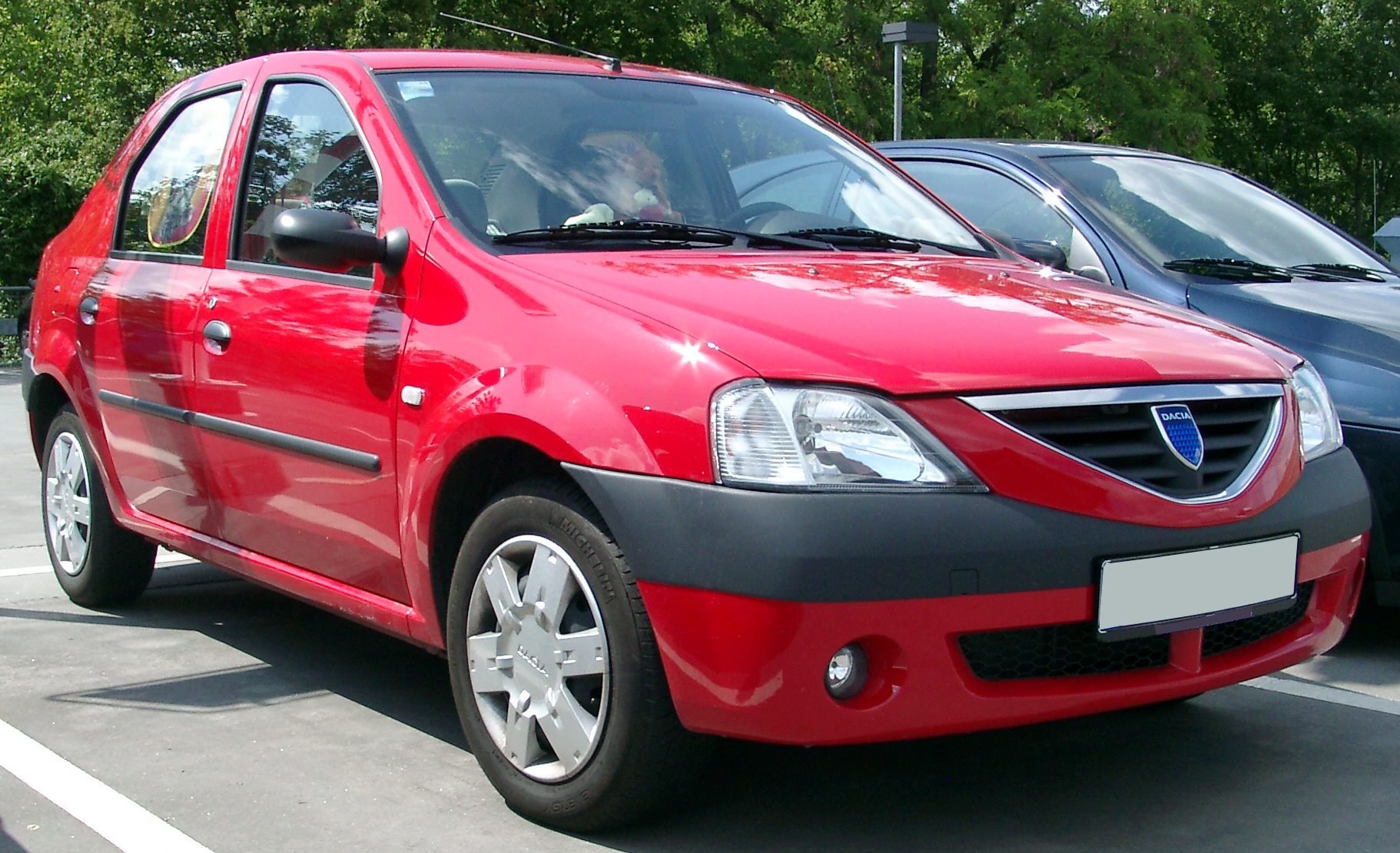

Overview
- Also called: Renault Logan; Saipa-Renault ParsTondar (Iran); Renault Tondar 90 (Iran); Pars Khodro Nova/Cadila (P90) (Iran); Nissan Aprio (Mexico); Mahindra Verito/eVerito (India); Mahindra-Renault Logan (India); Nissan NP200 (pick-up, South Africa); Lada Largus (wagon, Russia); EMC E36 (electric)
- Production: 2004–2012 (Romania); 2005–2015 (Colombia); 2005–2015 (Russia); 2011–present (Russia, Lada Largus); 2007–2019 (India); 2007–2021 (Iran); 2009–2024 (South Africa)
- Assembly: Romania: Mioveni; Brazil: São José dos Pinhais (Renault Brazil); Colombia: Envigado (Sofasa); India: Nashik (Mahindra); Iran: Tehran (Pars Khodro, IKCO); Morocco: Casablanca (Somaca); Russia: Moscow (Avtoframos); Tolyatti (Lada) (Note: Only the station wagon, rebadged as the Lada Largus.); South Africa: Rosslyn, Gauteng (Nissan South Africa) (Note: Only the pick-up version, rebadged as the Nissan NP200.)
- Designer: Renault Technocentre

Body and chassis
- Body style: 4-door sedan 5-door station wagon 5-door panel van 2-door coupé utility (pick-up)
- Platform: Dacia B0 platform
- Related: Dacia Sandero; Dacia Duster

Powertrain
- Engine: Petrol: 1.2 L 16v D4F I4; 1.4 L K7J I4; 1.6 L K7M I4; 1.6 L 16v K4M I4; 1.6 L 16v ME16 I4 (Iran); Flex-fuel: 1.0 L D4D I4; 1.2 L 16v D4F I4; 1.4 L K7J I4; 1.6 L K7M I4; Diesel: 1.5 L K9K dCi I4 turbo
- Electric motor: 3 Phase AC Induction Motor
- Power output: 42 hp (31 kW), 91 N⋅m
- Transmission: 5-speed manual 4-speed automatic (Note: Available in certain markets only, such as Brazil, Mexico and Russia.)

Dimensions
- Wheelbase: 2,630 mm (103.5 in) (sedan); 2,905 mm (114.4 in) (station wagon & pick-up); 2,900 mm (114.2 in) (panel van)
- Length: 4,288 mm (168.8 in) (sedan); 4,473 mm (176.1 in) (station wagon); 4,450 mm (175.2 in) (panel van); 4,496 mm (177.0 in) (pick-up)
- Width: 1,740 mm (68.5 in) (sedan, station wagon & panel van); 1,735 mm (68.3 in) (pick-up)
- Height: 1,534 mm (60.4 in) (sedan); 1,640 mm (64.6 in) & 1,674 mm (65.9 in) (station wagon & panel van); 1,554 mm (61.2 in) (pick-up)
- Curb weight: 1,090–1,360 kg (2,403–2,998 lb)

Chronology
- Successor: Dacia Lodgy (for MCV); Dacia Dokker (for van)

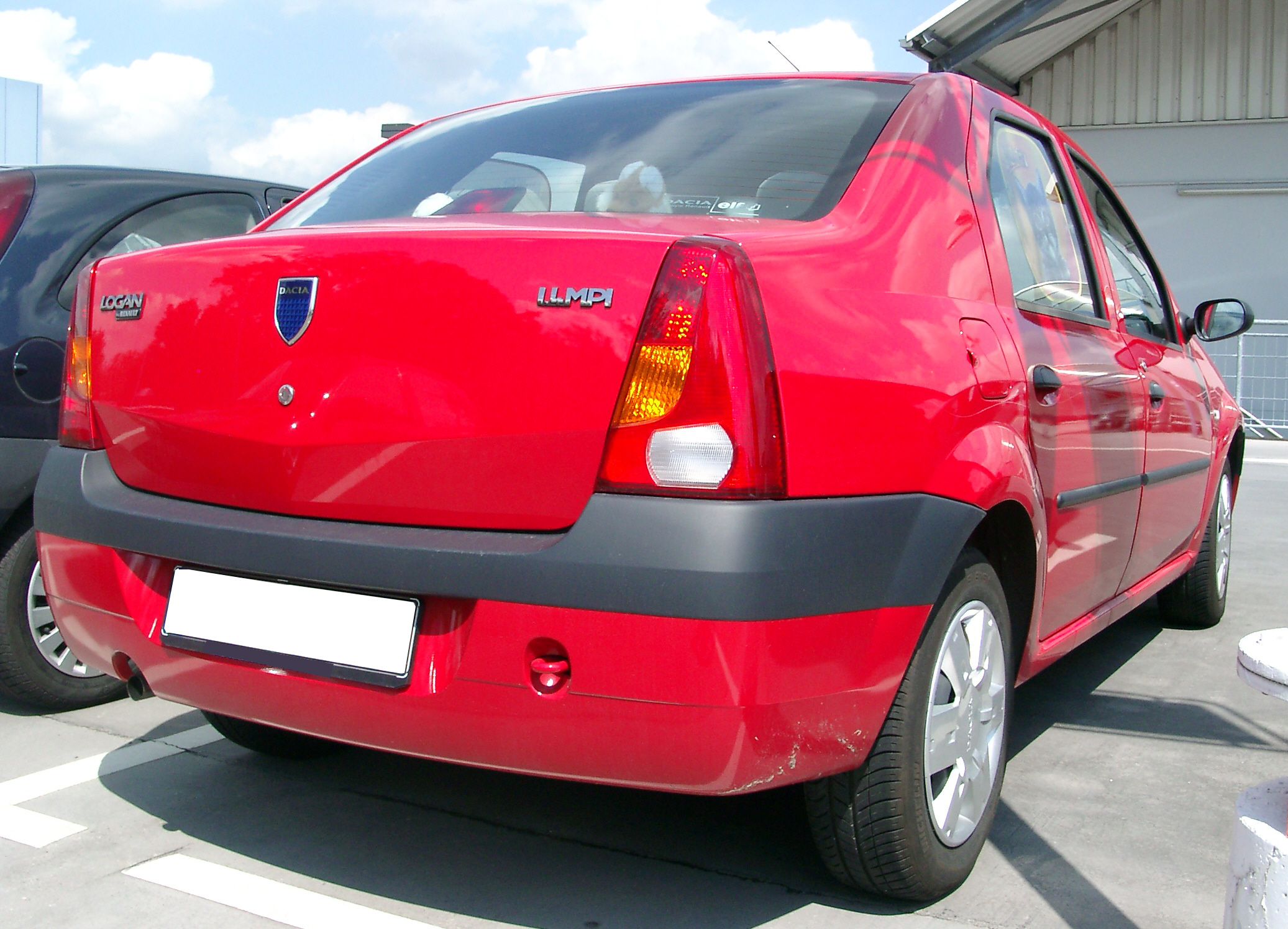
Rear (pre-facelift)

The first-generation Logan was designed at Renault's Technocentre near Paris, being the result of four years of development of the X90 project, announced by Renault in 1999, after the purchase of Dacia in the same year.

During a visit to Russia by French President Jacques Chirac, Louis Schweitzer noted that at Lada and Renault dealerships the €6,000 Ladas were selling very well while the €12,000 Renaults stayed in the showroom. "Seeing those antiquated cars, I found it unacceptable that technical progress should stop you making a good car for €6,000." The cheapest version of the car is €5,900, and the price can reach €11,200, depending on equipment and customs duty. (The base model for Western Europe, where it is badged as a Dacia but generally sold in Renault dealerships, is somewhat more expensive).

The Logan was designed from the outset as an affordable car, and has many simplified features to keep costs down. It replaces many older cars in production, including the Romanian Dacia 1310 series of Renault 12-based cars.

It was officially launched in June 2004, and began marketing in September 2004. Renault originally had no plans to sell the Logan in Western Europe, but in June 2005, they began importing a more expensive version of the car, starting at around €7,500. It was an unexpected success with people wanting an inexpensive, no-frills car they could repair themselves.

=== Facelift ===
On 1 July 2008, almost four years after the release of the first Logan, a facelifted version called the Dacia New Logan was announced. The new version features a more modern design and a more attractive and more comfortable interior. This facelift was adopted on the station wagon in October the same year.

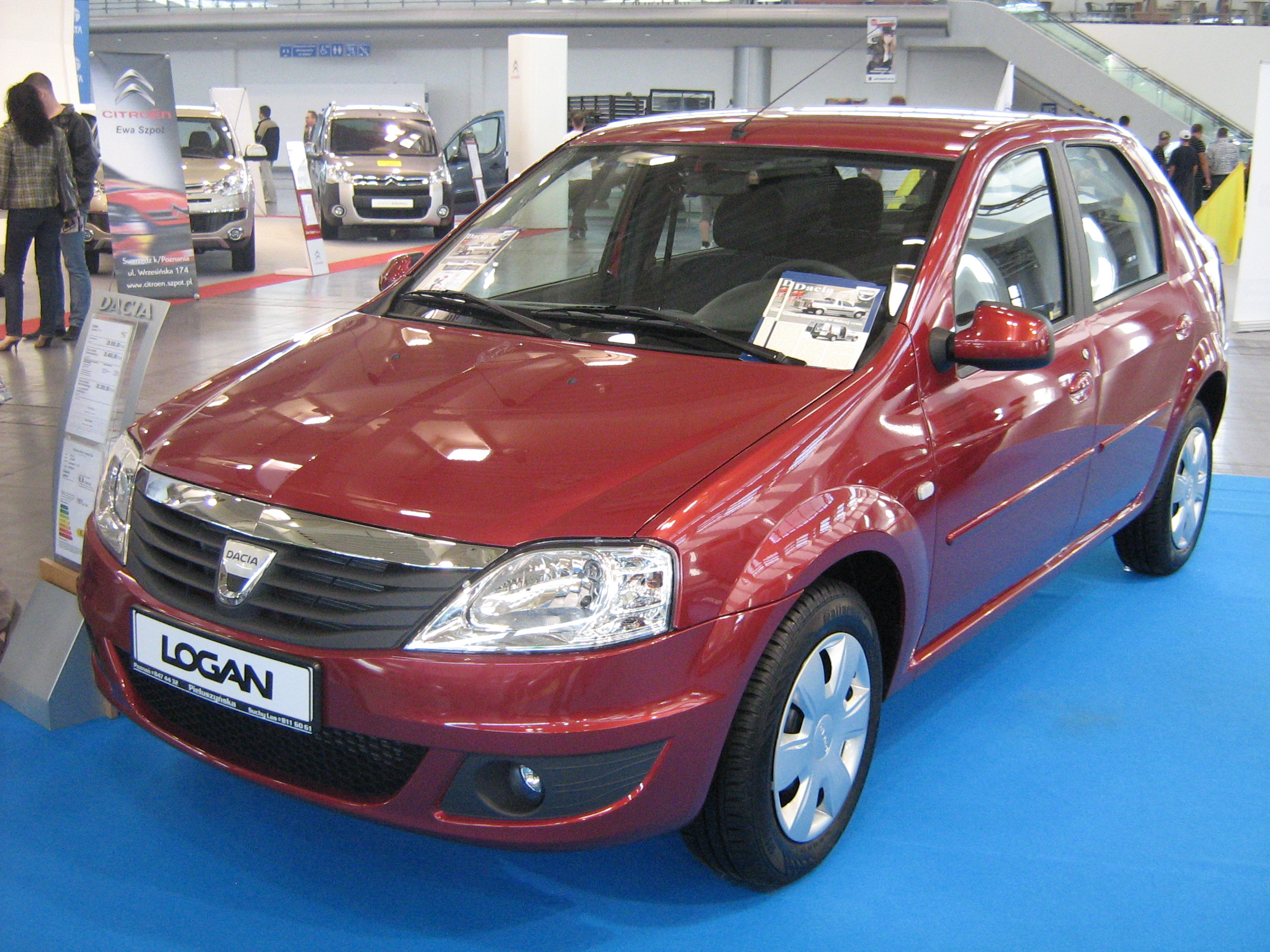
Dacia Logan (facelift) - front

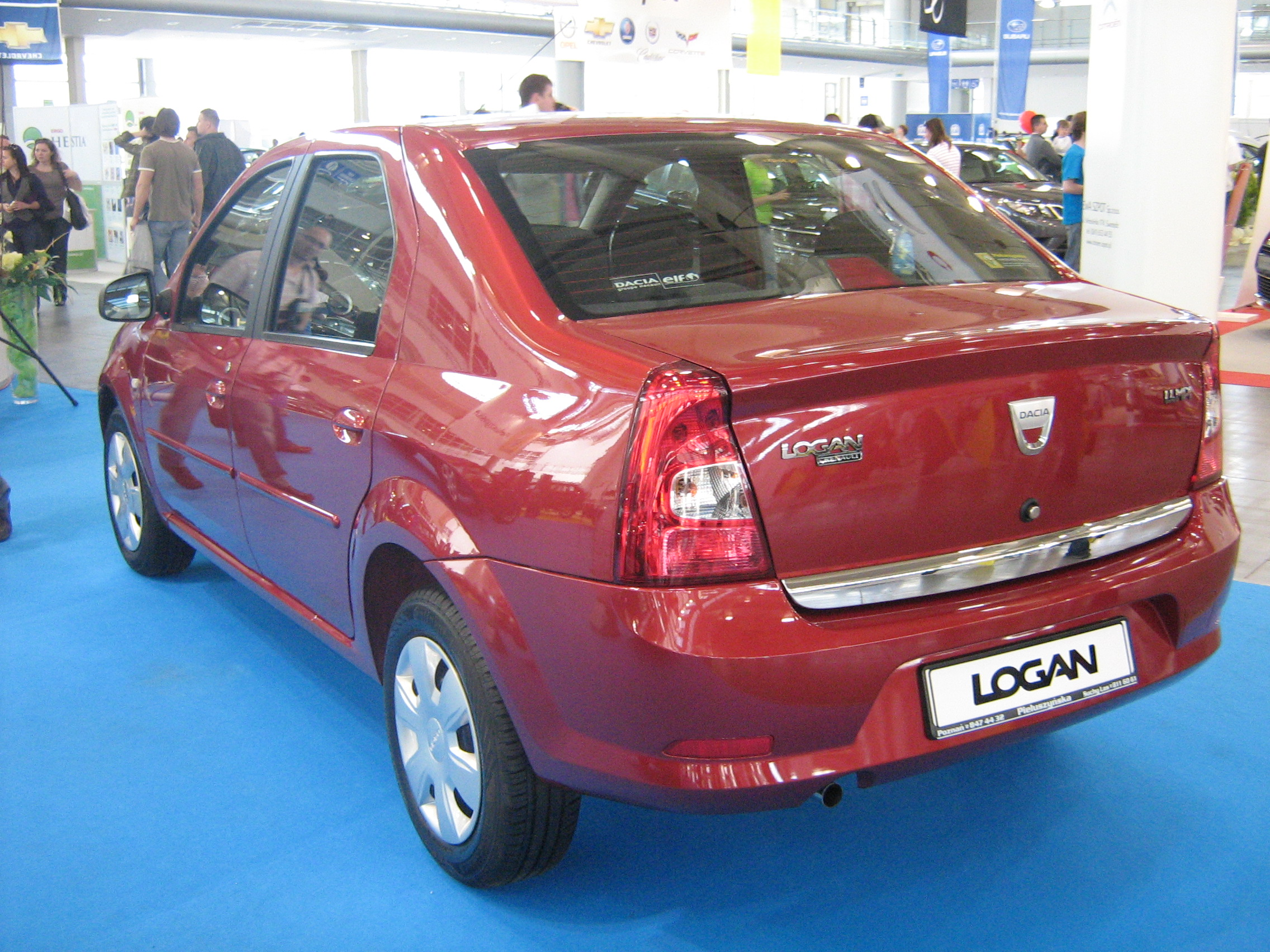
Dacia Logan (facelift) - rear

=== Features ===
The Logan is based on the Dacia B0 platform, also used for other Renault and Nissan models. It has 50% fewer parts than a high-end Renault vehicle and has a limited number of electronic devices. This makes the car cheaper to produce and easier and cheaper to repair.

Some parts are also much simpler than those of its competitors. For example, rear-view mirrors are symmetrical and can be used on either side of the car, the windshield is flatter than usual, and the dashboard is a single injection-molded piece.

The developers have taken into account several differences between road and climate conditions in developed and developing countries. The Logan suspension is soft and strong, and the chassis sits visibly higher than most other compact cars to help it negotiate dirt roads and potholes on ill-maintained asphalt roads. The engine is specially prepared to handle lower quality fuel, whereas the air conditioning is powerful enough to lower the temperature several degrees (temperatures above 40 °C are common in the Middle East and the Mediterranean Sea).

=== Trim levels ===
In Romania, it was initially available in four trim levels: Ambiance, Preference, Laureate and Ambition. The basic trim level, Ambiance, featured a driver airbag, optional body-coloured bumpers, wheel trims and electric door locks. The second trim level, Preference, added a passenger airbag, power steering, electric front windows, a radio, two rear seat head restraints and remote locking. The third trim level, Laureate, added front fog lights, air conditioning, a trip computer, electric mirrors, three rear seat head restraints and a multi-adjustable driver seat. The top trim level, Ambition also had ABS, electric rear windows, a CD player and alloy wheels. The 1.6-litre petrol engine was only available starting with the Preference trim level. In September 2005, the 1.5-litre diesel engine was introduced, initially not being available on the Ambition trim level. In January 2006, a new intermediate trim level called Laureate Plus was added, which in addition to the Laureate trim level featured ABS, electric rear windows and a CD player. Also, the diesel engine became available for the Ambition trim level.

In September 2006, several improvements were introduced to the range, such as a new button for the trunk lid, a new knob for the gear lever, crystal rear lamps, as well as new designs for the wheel trims and the alloy wheels in addition to three new paint colours. Also, the new top of the range level Prestige was introduced, which featured larger door mirrors, body-coloured bumpers (entirely), side moldings and door handles, leather-trimmed gear lever and steering wheel, as well as other interior refinements. It was only available with a new 1.6-litre 16-valve petrol engine, which developed 105 hp (77 kW).

In July 2007, a more powerful version of the 1.5-litre diesel engine was added, developing 85 hp (63 kW). It was initially made available only for the station wagon, on the Preference and Laureate levels, and in September 2007, it also became available for the sedan version, on the Laureate, Ambition and Prestige levels.

In June 2009, the new 1.2-litre 16-valve petrol engine was added for both the Logan and the Sandero. The engine was capable of developing a maximum power of 75 hp (55 kW) and 107 N⋅m (79 lb⋅ft) of torque.

=== Safety ===
In June 2005, the car achieved a three-star rating at the Euro NCAP crash tests. This result confirms initial expectations stated previously by Renault.

Depending on the equipment level, standard on some variants and optional on others, the facelifted Logan comes with driver, passenger and side airbags. In terms of active safety, all versions feature the latest generation Bosch 8.1 ABS, which incorporates EBD (electronic brakeforce distribution) and EBA (emergency brake assist).

=== Engines ===
When the Logan appeared, all engines complied to the Euro 3 standard and since January 2007, all engines have complied with the Euro 4 standard, including the diesel engine, whose power has increased to 70 hp.

Name	Code	Capacity	Type	Power	Torque	Top speed	Combined consumption
1.0 16v	D4D Hi-Flex	999 cc	16 valves SOHC	57 kW (77 PS) at 5850 rpm	99 N⋅m (73 lb⋅ft) at 4350 rpm	160 km/h (99 mph)	(gas/ethanol)
1.2 16v	D4F 732	1,149 cc	16 valves SOHC	55 kW (75 PS) at 5500 rpm	107 N⋅m (79 lb⋅ft) at 4250 rpm	161 km/h (100 mph)	5.9 L/100 km (48 mpg_{‑imp}; 40 mpg_{‑US})
1.4 8v	K7J 710	1,390 cc	8 valves SOHC	55 kW (75 PS) at 5500 rpm	112 N⋅m (83 lb⋅ft) at 3000 rpm	162 km/h (101 mph)	6.9 L/100 km (41 mpg_{‑imp}; 34 mpg_{‑US})
1.6 8v	K7M 710	1,598 cc	8 valves SOHC	64 kW (87 PS) at 5500 rpm	128 N⋅m (94 lb⋅ft) at 3000 rpm	175 km/h (109 mph)	7.3 L/100 km (39 mpg_{‑imp}; 32 mpg_{‑US})
1.6 8v	K7M Hi-Torque	1,598 cc	8 valves SOHC	70 kW (95 PS) at 5250 rpm	138 N⋅m (102 lb⋅ft) at 2850 rpm	175 km/h (109 mph)	(gas/ethanol)
1.6 8v	K7M Hi-Power	1,598 cc	8 valves SOHC	72 kW (98 PS) at 5500 rpm	138 N⋅m (102 lb⋅ft) at 2850 rpm	182 km/h (113 mph)	(gas/ethanol)
1.6 16v	K4M 690	1,598 cc	16 valves DOHC	77 kW (105 PS) at 5750 rpm	148 N⋅m (109 lb⋅ft) at 3750 rpm	183 km/h (114 mph)	7.1 L/100 km (40 mpg_{‑imp}; 33 mpg_{‑US})
1.6 16v	K4M Hi-Flex	1,598 cc	16 valves DOHC	107 kW (145 PS) at 5750 rpm	152 N⋅m (112 lb⋅ft) at 3750 rpm	185 km/h (115 mph)	(gas/ethanol)
1.5 dCi	K9K 700	1,461 cc	8 valves SOHC	48 kW (65 PS) at 4000 rpm	160 N⋅m (118 lb⋅ft) at 1900 rpm	155 km/h (96 mph)	4.9 L/100 km (58 mpg_{‑imp}; 48 mpg_{‑US})
1.5 dCi	K9K 792	1,461 cc	8 valves SOHC	55 kW (75 PS) at 4000 rpm	160 N⋅m (118 lb⋅ft) at 1700 rpm	158 km/h (98 mph)	4.7 L/100 km (60 mpg_{‑imp}; 50 mpg_{‑US})
1.5 dCi	K9K 796	1,461 cc	8 valves SOHC	66 kW (90 PS) at 3750 rpm	200 N⋅m (148 lb⋅ft) at 1900 rpm	167 km/h (104 mph)	4.6 L/100 km (61 mpg_{‑imp}; 51 mpg_{‑US})

=== Marketing and production ===
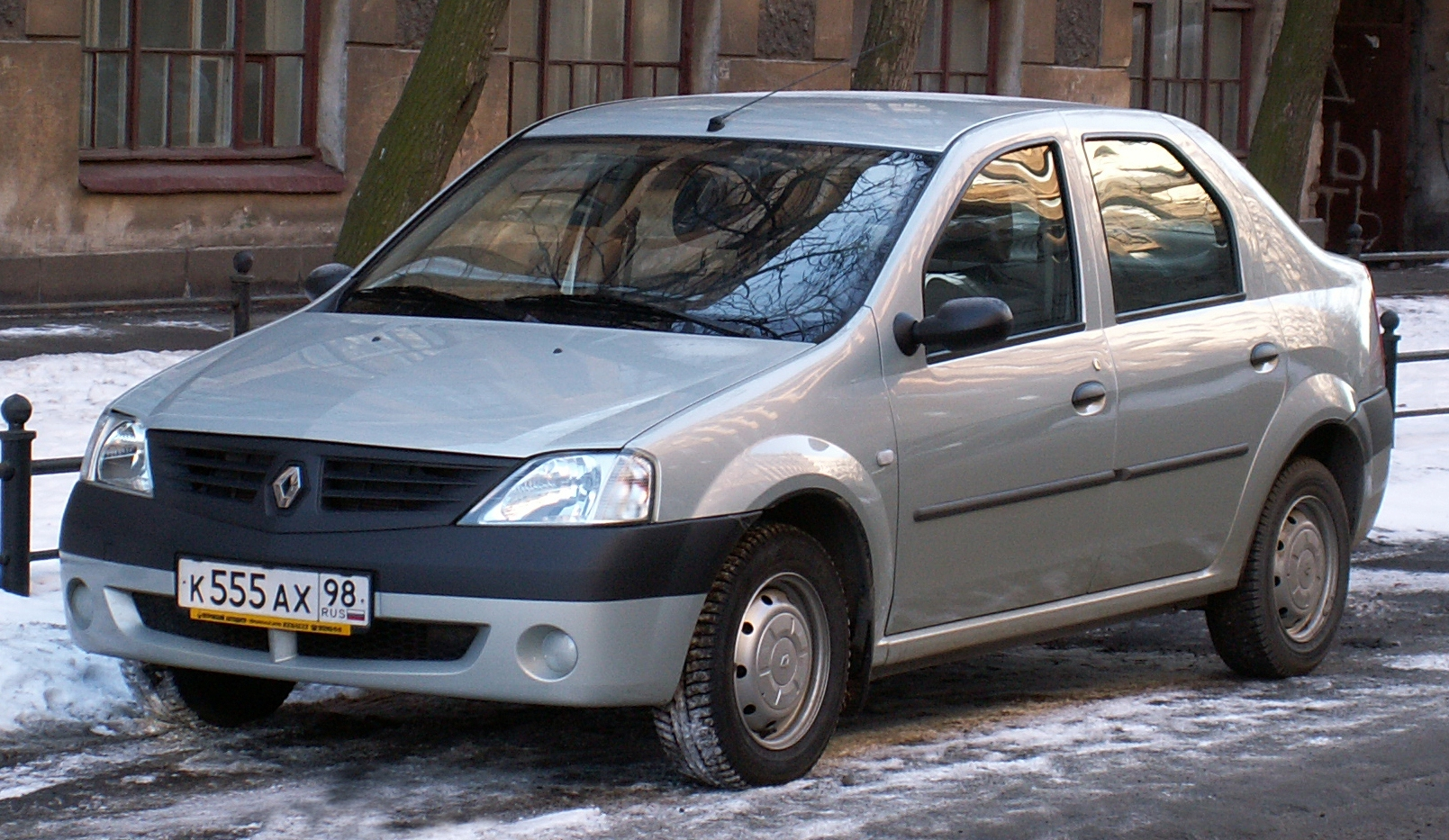
Renault Logan assembled by Avtoframos (Russia)

The Logan, vital to increasing sales of the Renault group to the 4 million mark by 2010, is manufactured in nine production and operational assembly centres: Romania (Automobile Dacia), the pilot plant of the Logan Programme, Russia (Avtoframos), Morocco (Somaca), Colombia (Sofasa), Iran (two assembly plants (Iran Khodro and Pars Khodro) supervised by Renault-Pars), India (Mahindra), Brazil (Renault), and South Africa (Nissan South Africa). The CKD centre is named the International Logistics Network and is located near the Mioveni plant in Romania. It is the biggest logistic centre of its kind, not only within the Renault Group but in the entire global automotive industry.

==== Dacia models ====
In markets where Renault has a presence, such as Europe (Russia, Belarus and Ukraine excepted), Turkey, the Maghreb, and Chile, it is generally sold as the Dacia Logan.

==== Renault & Nissan models ====
Exceptions are South Africa, Argentina, Russia, Ukraine, (Note: In Ukraine, it was marketed under the Dacia marque until September 2009.) Colombia, Ecuador, Israel, Egypt, Brazil, Chile, Peru, Saudi Arabia, India, Nepal and Venezuela where it is marketed as the Renault Logan, and furthermore Mexico, where the Logan was sold as the Nissan Aprio, given the better reputation of the Japanese brand and stronger brand recognition of Nissan itself in the Mexican market. (Note: Nissan is the partner of Renault in the Renault–Nissan Alliance.) The Nissan Aprio has the 1.6-litre 16 valve straight-four engine with a 5-speed manual or 4-speed automatic transmission, and was assembled in Brazil. It was later discontinued from that market in August 2010, due to decreasing sales, and the Versa replaced it for the 2012 model year.

In Brazil, it was manufactured by Renault at the São José dos Pinhais factory since 2007, with the facelifted model being introduced in 2010.

In South Africa, only the pick-up version was manufactured, at the Nissan factory in Rosslyn, starting from 2009.

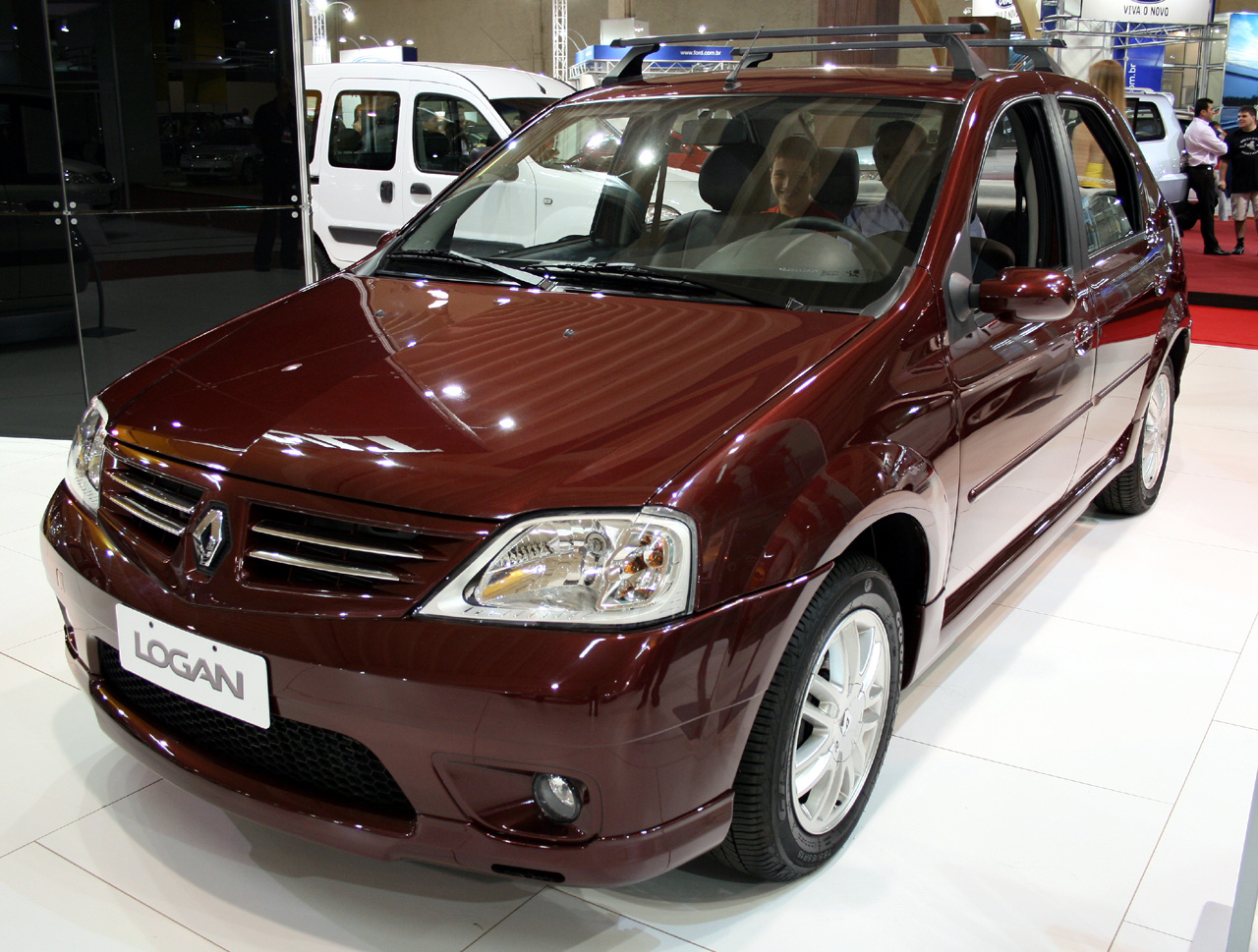
2007 Renault Logan (Brazil)

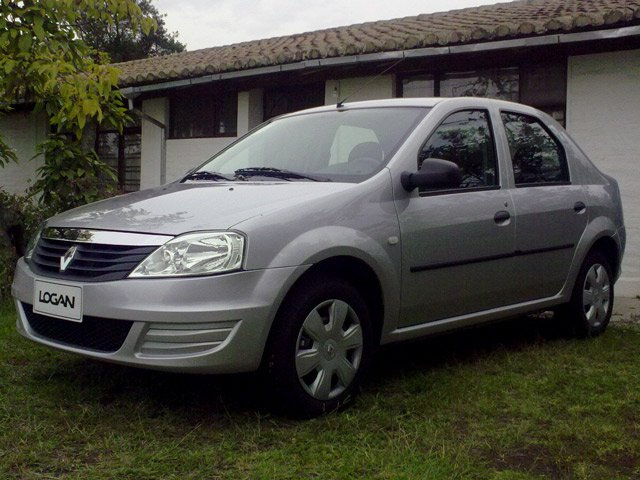
2011 Renault Logan (Ecuador)

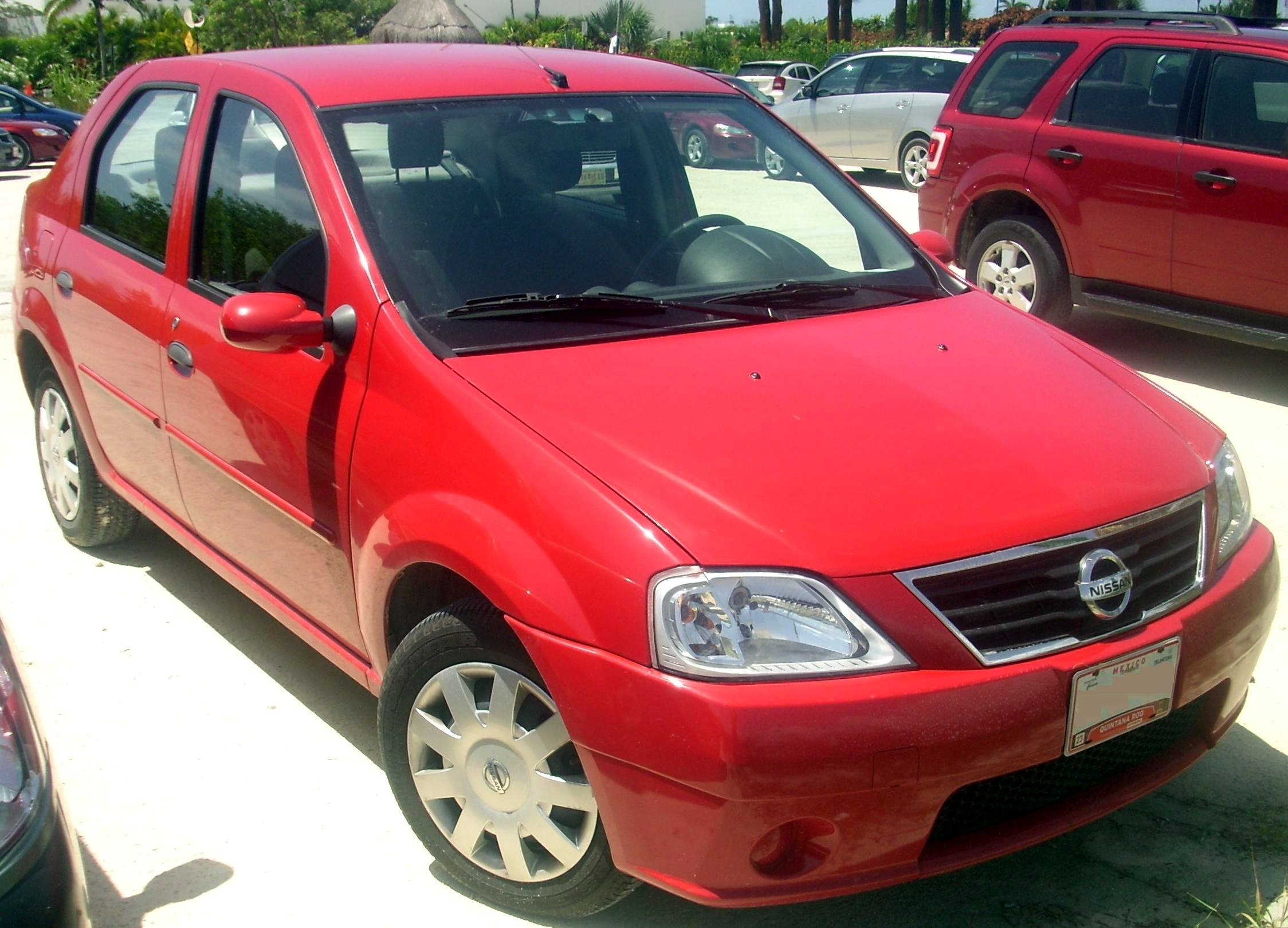
2008 Nissan Aprio (Mexico)

==== India ====
In India, the Logan was marketed as the Mahindra Renault Logan. In 2005, Renault partnered the Indian utility and commercial vehicles manufacturer Mahindra & Mahindra (M&M). The Logan was launched in India in April 2007, as a collaboration with Mahindra, who helped Renault cut costs by 15%. India was the first right-hand drive market for the Logan. Logan could not make it in the Indian market, selling just over 44,000 vehicles since then, with an additional 2,600 vehicles in Nepal and South Africa where M&M also held the licence to sell the Logan. In April 2010, it was announced that the M&M had bought out Renault's 49% in the Mahindra-Renault joint venture. The new agreement gave M&M more flexibility in engineering the car to suit the needs of the Indian consumer. The Logan was marketed with the Mahindra-Renault logo until the end of March 2011.

===== Mahindra Verito =====
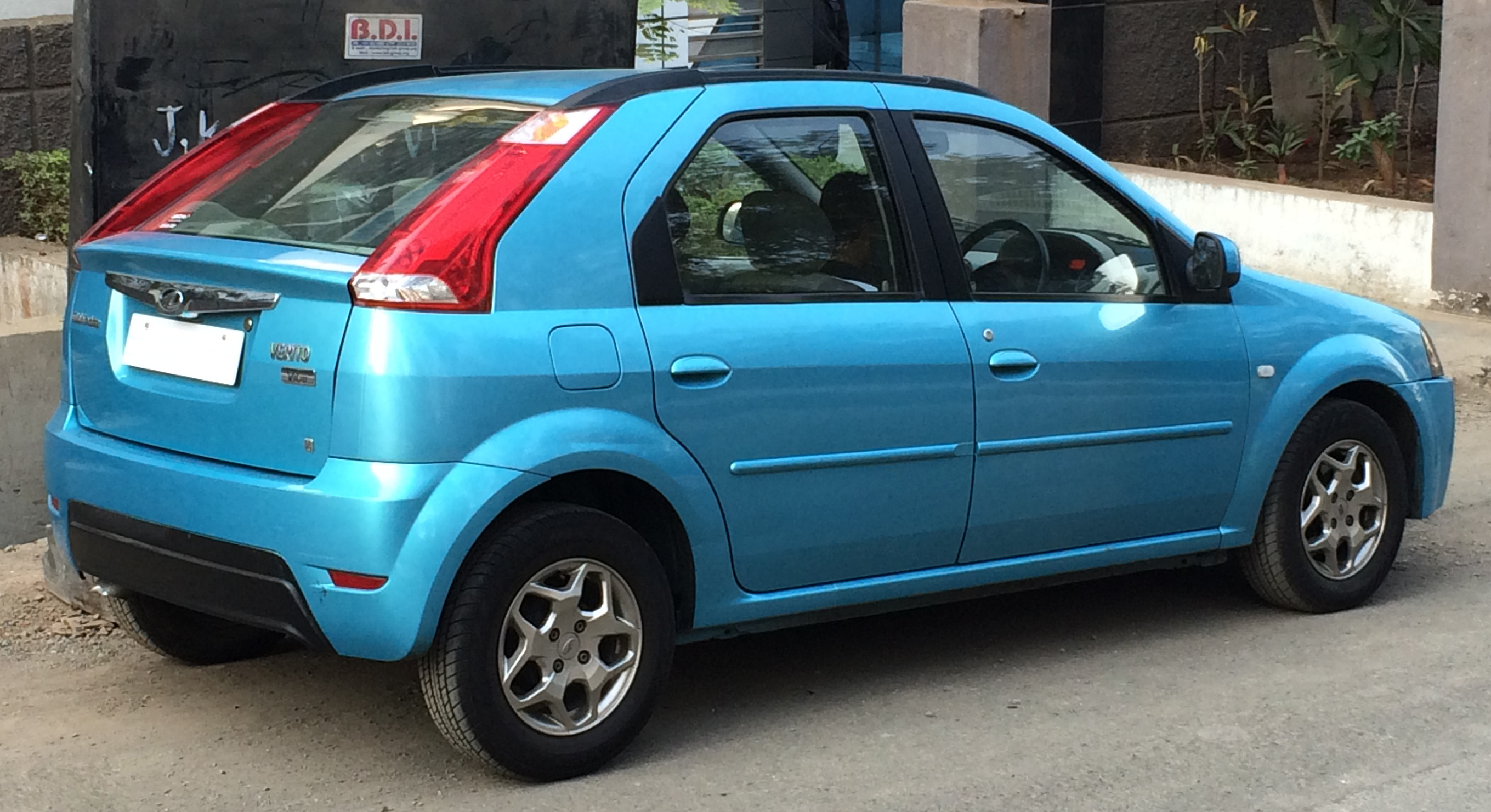
The Mahindra Verito Vibe notchback derived from the Logan model

Following the dissolution of the Indian joint venture between Renault India and M&M in 2010, Mahindra retained the rights to produce and sell the Logan under its own name of Mahindra Verito, with minor alterations to the front, but retaining Renault diesel engines. On 26 July 2012, a facelifted version of the car was revealed by Mahindra in New Delhi, and on 5 June 2013, a notchback version was launched in Mumbai, called the Mahindra Verito Vibe. Production was shut down on 31 December 2019.

An electric version of the Verito sedan and its notchback version Verito Vibe was sold as the Mahindra eVerito from 2016. Production was shut down on 31 December 2019.

==== Iran ====
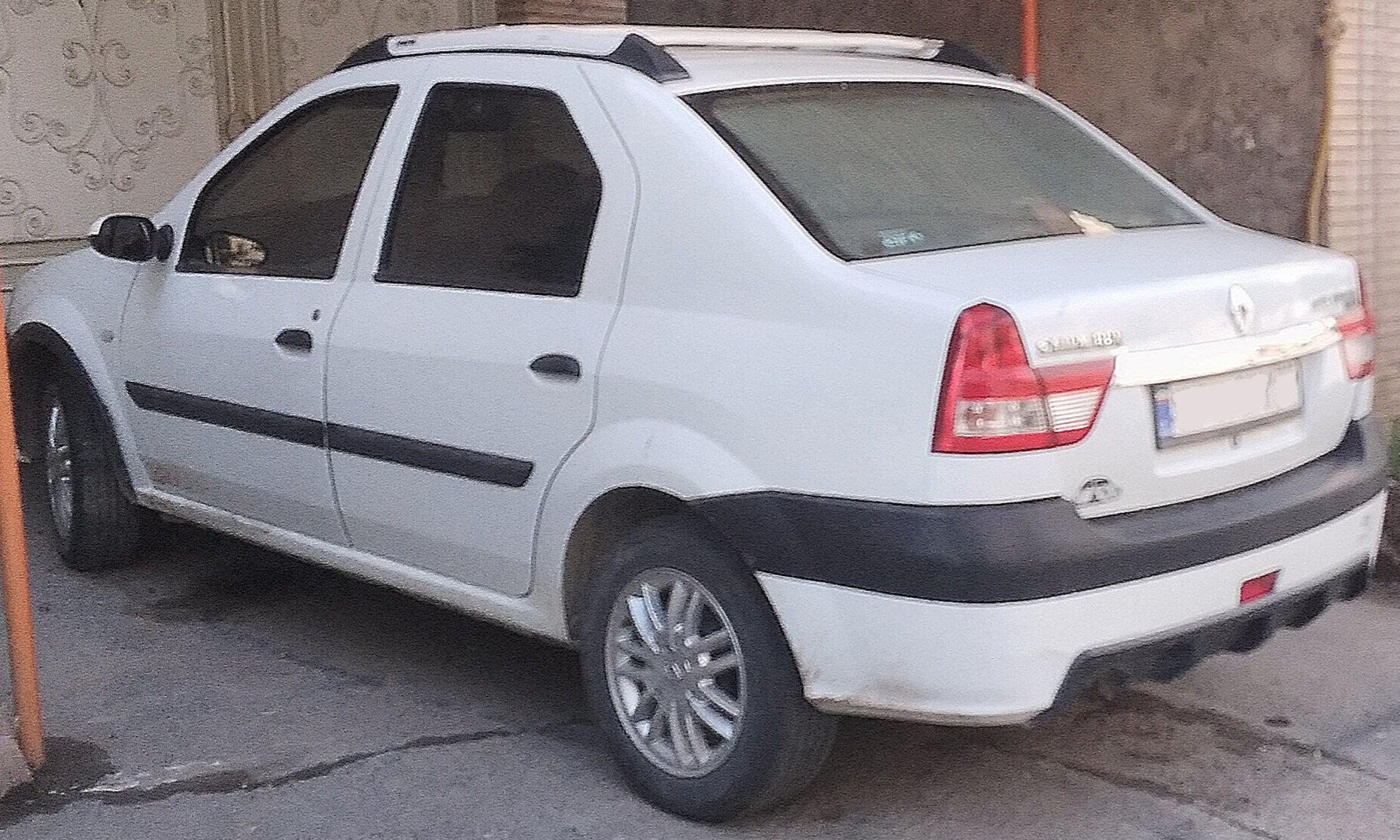
Renault Pars Tondar

In 2007, the Logan branded as Renault Tondar 90 (also called Renault L90), began to be marketed in Iran by Renault-Pars, manufactured by Pars Khodro and Iran Khodro. In the first month of production more than 100,000 Tondar 90 had been ordered. Renault Pars is a joint venture, 51 percent of which belongs to Renault of France. Forty-nine percent of Renault Pars' shares is jointly held by Iran's Industrial Development and Renovation Organization, IKCO and Saipa Group. The company was established in 2003. In 2010, IKCO and Pars Khodro started to produce CNG Tondar 90s which can run on both petrol and CNG. They stopped producing CNG models in 2012. In 2013, IKCO started to produce Tondar 90s with automatic gearbox and they also made it comply with the Euro IV standards. A facelifted version is sold as the Tondar 90+, along with the original one. There is also a pickup version called the Tondar Pick-Up. In 2014 Renault updated the transmission of Logan for Iranian market using JHQ gearbox instead of regular JH3 to make the car more reliable.

By 2018, Renault had left the Iranian market but in 2023, Pars Khodro released a facelifted version of the original Dacia Logan called Pars Khodro Cadilla with over 85 percent local parts content. The Cadila uses the 1.6-litre Saipa ME16 engine, which is actually an updated version of the PSA TU5 engine.

==== Electric versions ====
===== United States =====
In the United States, an attempt at marketing electric versions of the wagon, the van and the pick-up as the EMC E36 was launched by the EnVision Motor Company, based in Des Moines, Iowa. The automobiles were assembled by Dacia in Romania and powered by an asynchronous motor with a range of 200 mi (320 km) per charge, giving a top highway speed as high as 75 mph (121 km/h). EMC planned to use regenerative braking and is coupled to an automatic shiftless button transmission. The battery can be charged through a J1772 plug or from wall outlets of either 120 or 240 volts. This venture has since collapsed into bankruptcy.

===== Russia =====
The Lada e-Largus was announced on August 8, 2022, being a fully electric version based on the Largus Furgon model, and AvtoVAZ's first production electric vehicle since the Ellada in the early 2010s.

==== Production ====
Logan production began with a 4-door sedan, followed by a wagon in September 2006. Four other models, a pick-up truck, a panel van, a related hatchback (the Sandero) and a facelifted sedan followed in 2007 and 2008. Dacia sales for 2006 were over €1.5 billion, 19.6% more than in 2005. Annual production has reached almost 250,000 cars, half for exports. As of March 2009, more than 1.3 million vehicles on the Logan platform have been sold worldwide. On 3 September 2009, it was announced that one million Dacia cars on the Logan platform X90 have been produced at the Mioveni plant: 576,887 Logans, 246,869 Logan MCVs, 144,931 Sanderos and Stepways, 19,897 Logan VANs and 11,416 Logan Pick-Ups.

One of the reasons for the increase in sales is the dependability of Dacia cars. In a recent survey conducted by a French magazine, Dacia cars were voted one of the safest cars in France. Another reason is their low maintenance and repair costs. According to the survey, Dacia cars were the cheapest to maintain and repair. In Germany, Dacia was placed on the second position in the 2010 Vehicle Ownership Satisfaction Study released by J. D. Power and Associates in June 2010.

=== Logan MCV ===
The Logan MCV (Multi Convivial Vehicle), launched at the 2006 Paris Motor Show, is the station wagon version of the Logan. It has 5- or 7-seat versions, with a luggage space between 200 and 2,350 litres depending on how many seats are folded, and numerous storage spaces for smaller objects. It has a wheelbase longer by 275 mm (10.8 in) than the saloon, and larger rear doors for easy access to the third row of seats. It uses the same engines as the saloon, and an important improvement was the availability of side airbags. It has been considered a competitor for compact MPVs, for its dimensions and the 7-seat capacity.

Sales on the Romanian market began in October 2006 with prices ranging between €8,200 and €12,550, while sales to other countries began in early 2007. A revised version, with the new lights and bumper from the New Logan saloon, was released in late 2008. As of June 2010, Dacia produced 300,000 Logan MCVs.

Since 2012 it is also produced in Russia by AvtoVAZ as Lada Largus. This version was first exhibited at the 2010 Moscow International Motor Show as the Lada Project R90. It is also offered with crossover-style body elements as the Largus Cross.

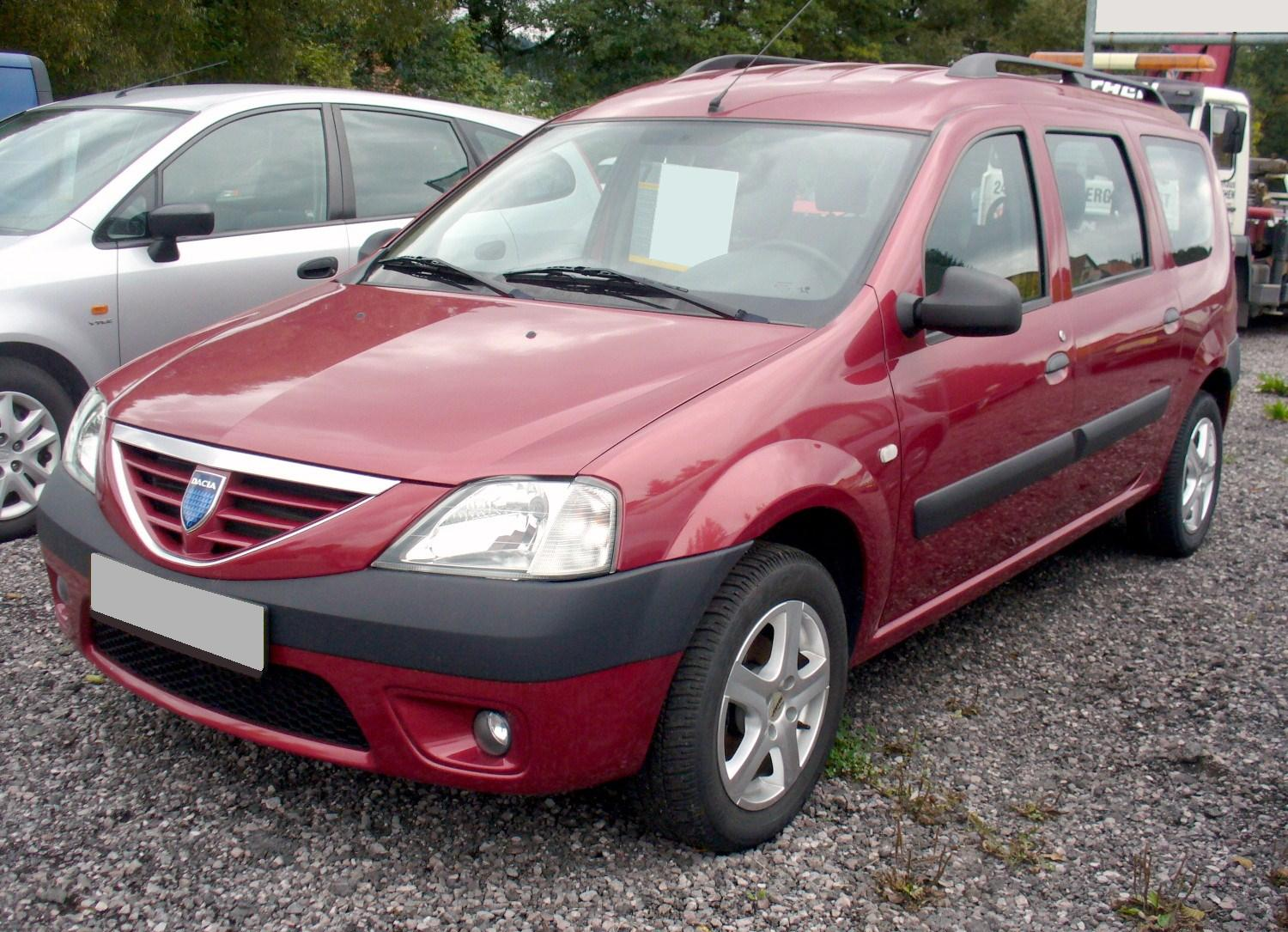
Dacia Logan MCV (pre-facelift)

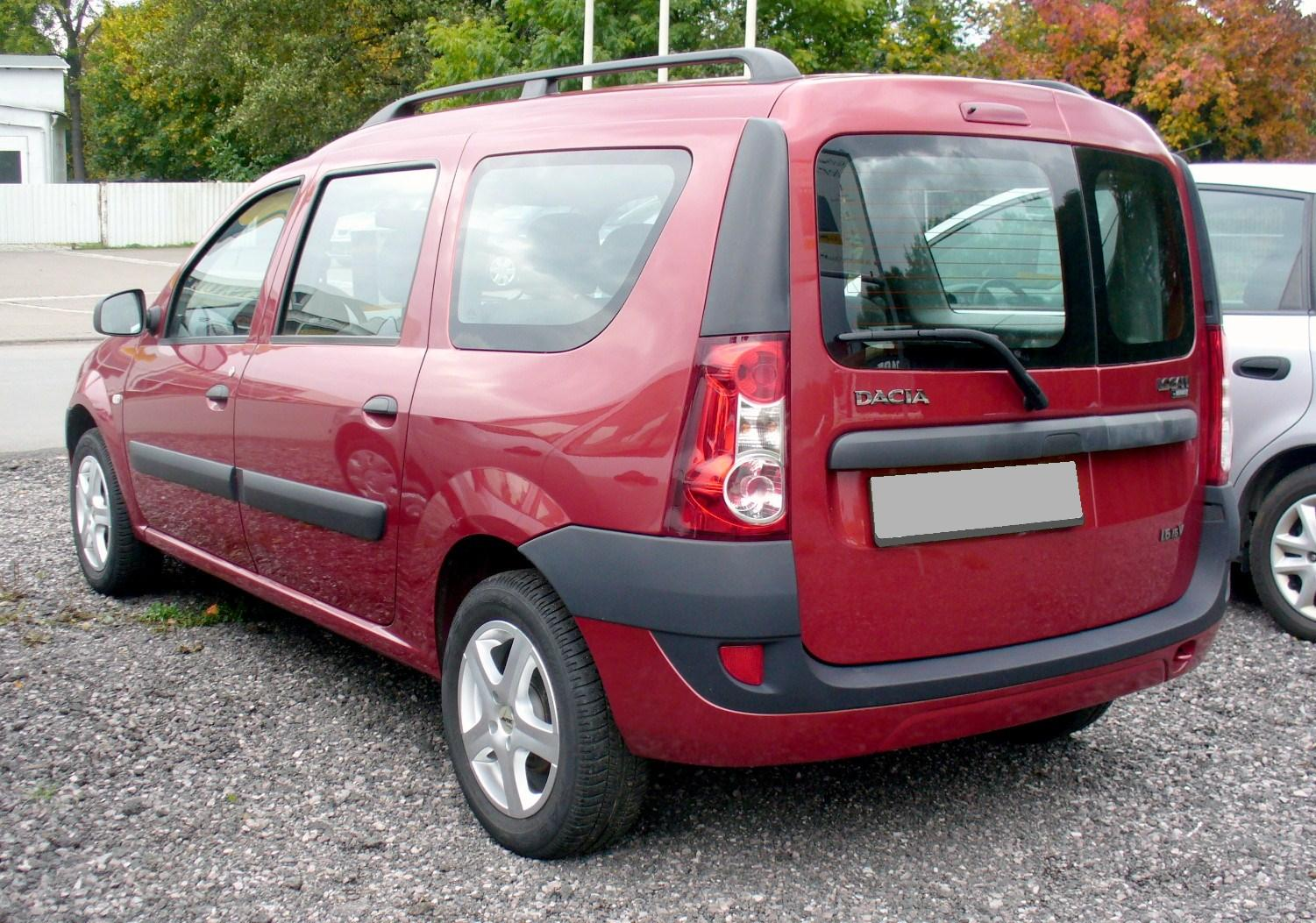
Dacia Logan MCV (pre-facelift)

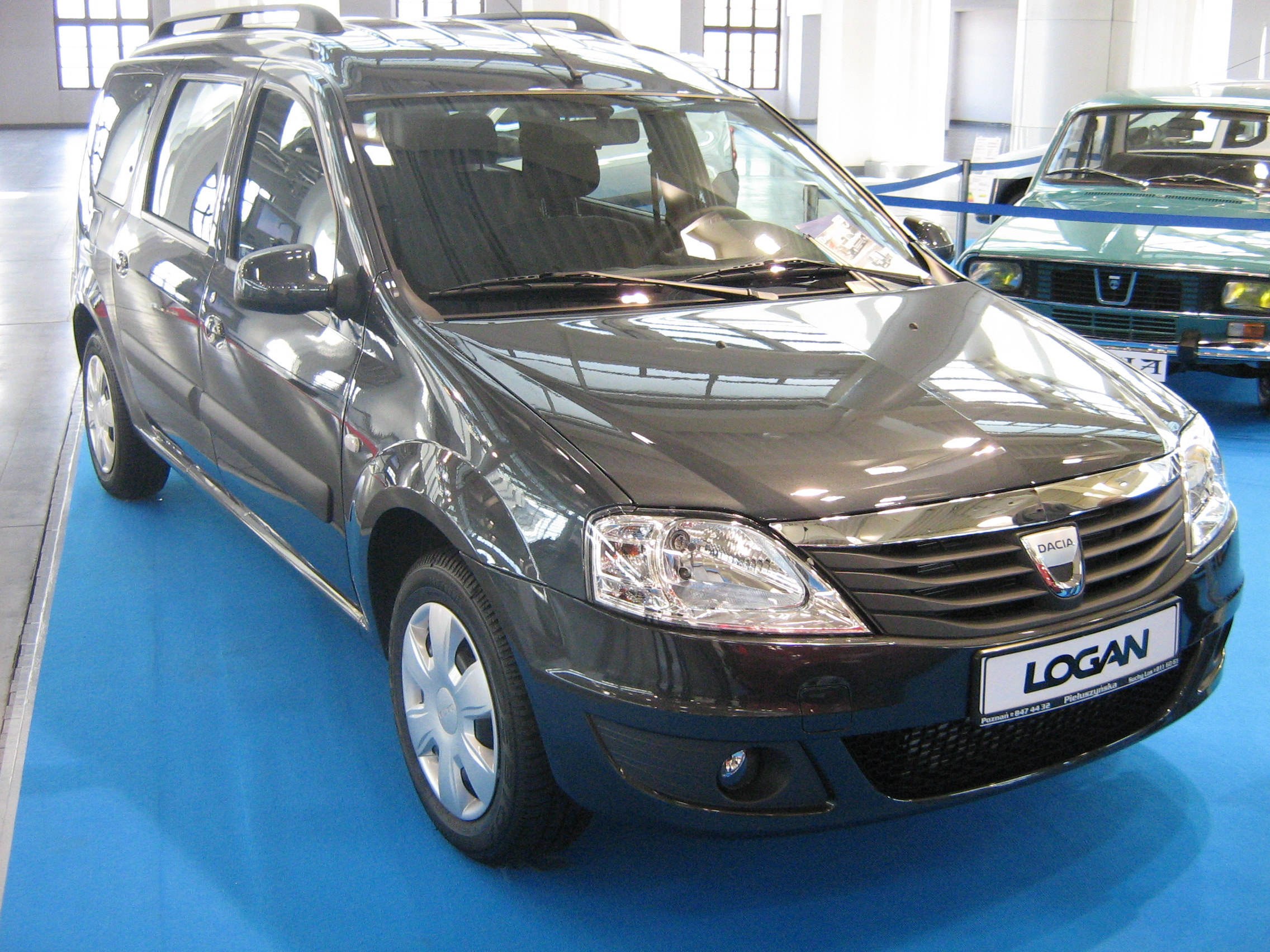
Dacia Logan MCV (facelift)

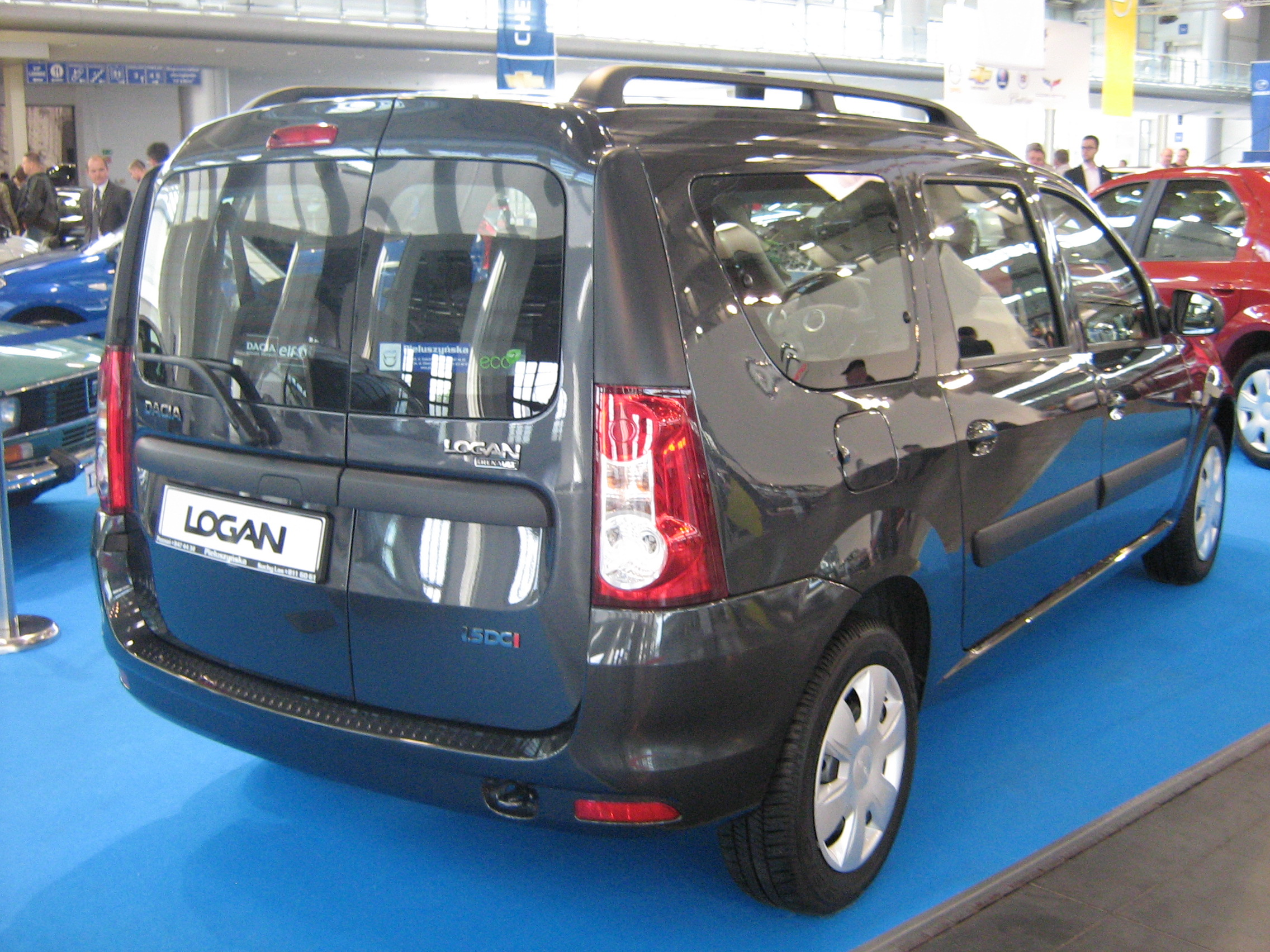
Dacia Logan MCV (facelift)

=== Logan Van ===
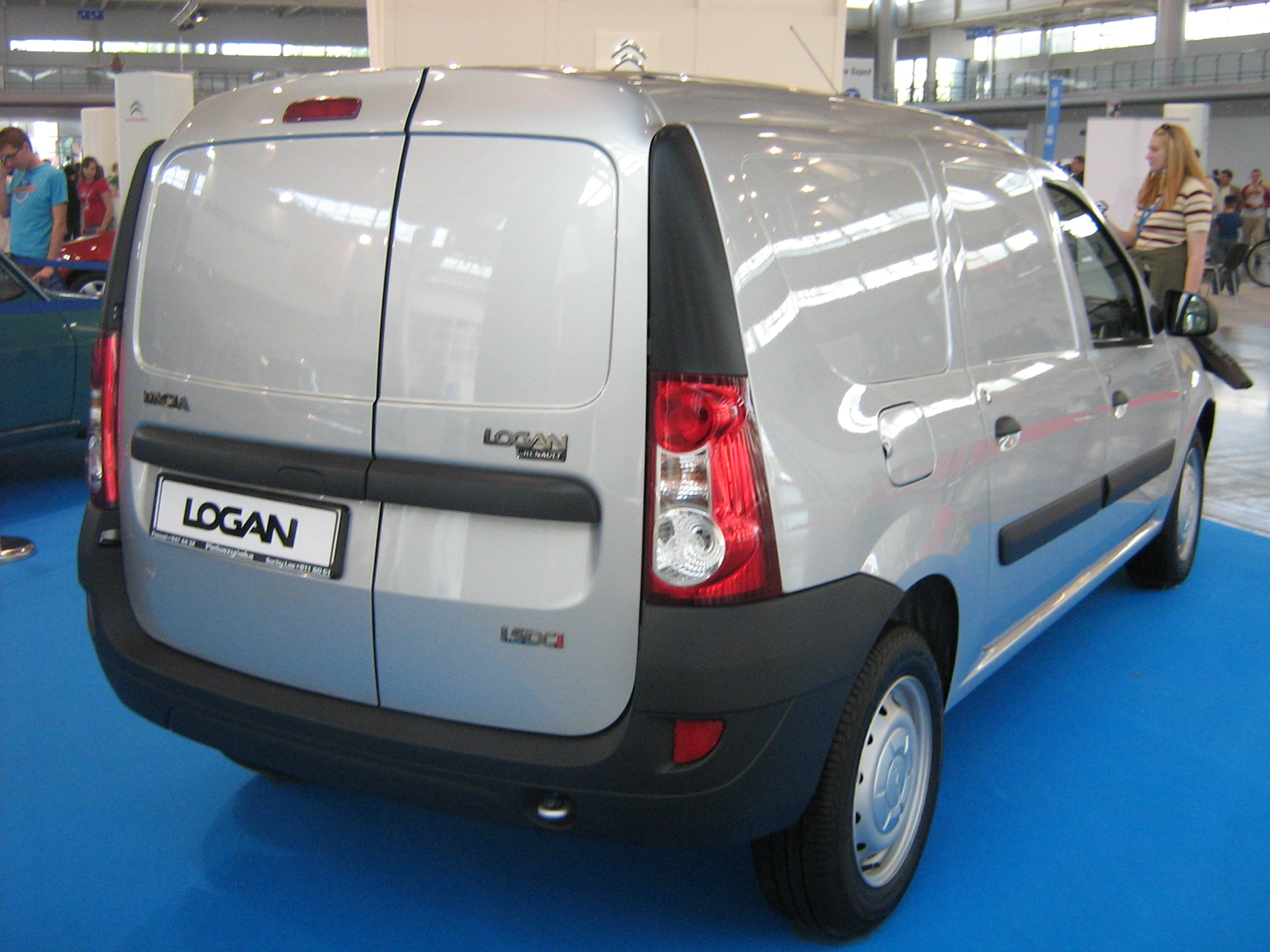
Dacia Logan Van

The panel van variant of the Logan was launched on 23 January 2007 in Bucharest. It is a small business oriented vehicle, with 2,500 litre loading space and 800 kg payload. The Logan Van is more or less an MCV without the rear side windows and therefore has the same safety features and uses the same engines as the other models (except the 1.6 16v engine). Production of this model was stopped in August 2012. Since its launch, over 53,000 units were manufactured. The panel van version continues to be produced as the Lada Largus by AvtoVAZ.

=== Logan Pick-Up ===
The coupé utility version of the Logan, also based on the MCV, was introduced on 10 September 2007 (4 October 2007 at the Bucharest International Motor Show), as a replacement for the Dacia Pick-Up. Sales began in Romania in 2008, with the price ranging between €7,300 and €9,450.

The Logan Pick-Up was discontinued by Dacia in July 2012, and it was not until October 2020 that the company introduced a new pickup model based on the Dacia Duster.

Starting October 2008, the Logan Pick-Up is sold in South Africa as the Nissan NP200. Visually similar to the original model at launch, it received a light facelift in early 2009. It is being built at the Nissan plant outside Pretoria, alongside the Renault Sandero, and is also exported to several Southern Africa countries such as Zimbabwe, Mozambique, Namibia, Zambia, Kenya, Uganda, Seychelles and Botswana. In March 2024, the NP200 was discontinued.

As of 2016, it is also offered in Iran as the Renault Tondar Pick-Up.

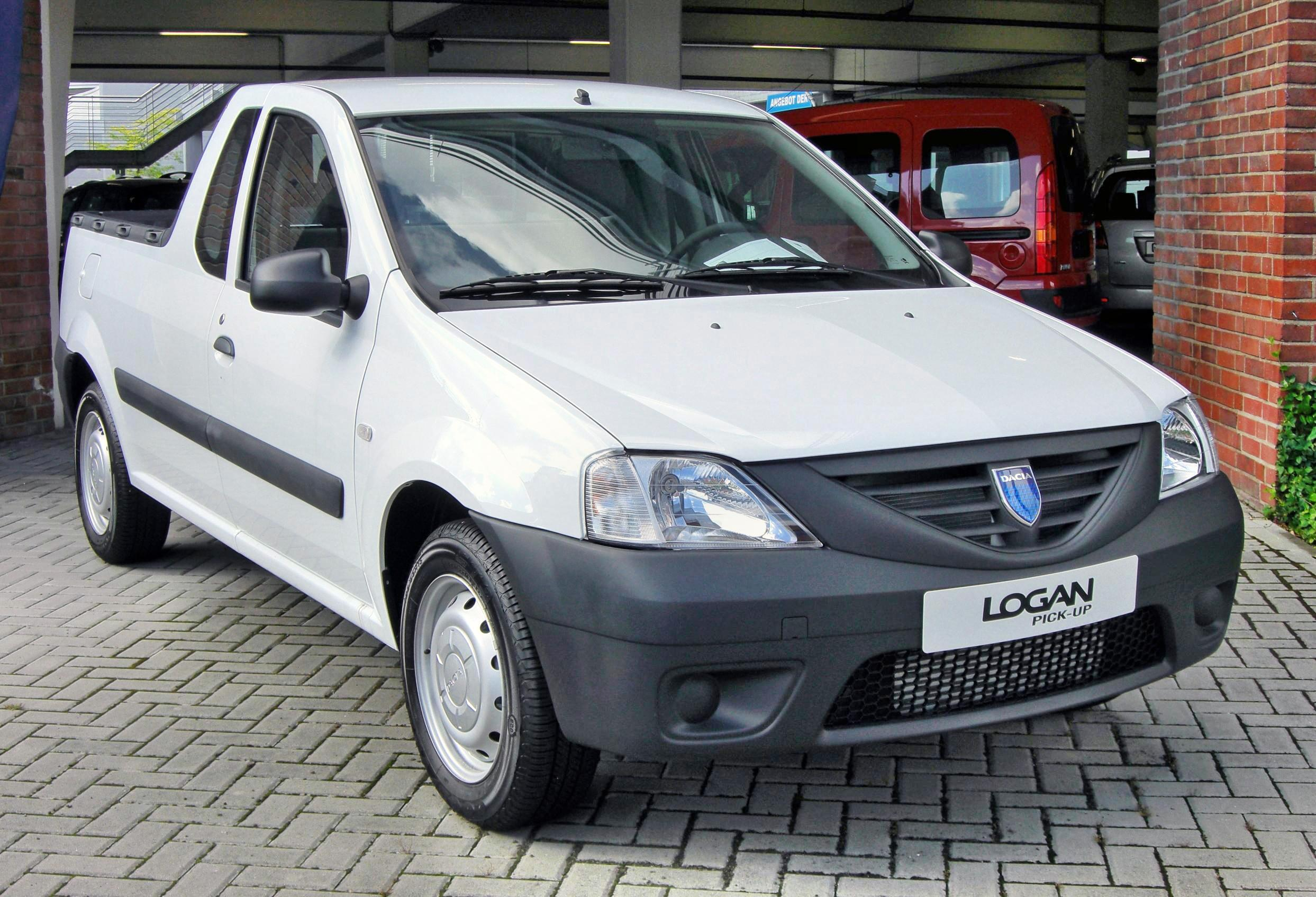
Dacia Logan Pick-Up

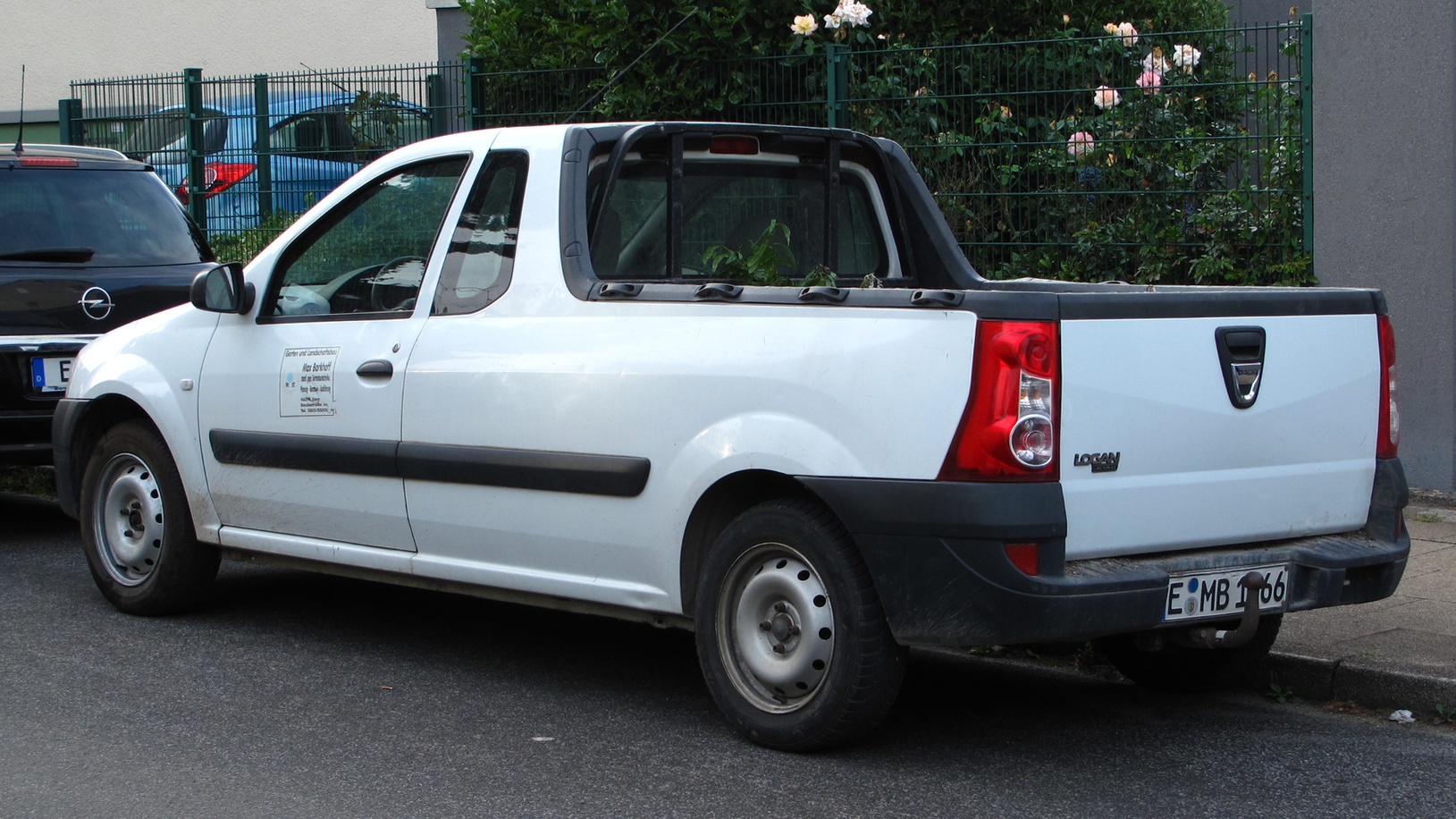
Dacia Logan Pick-Up

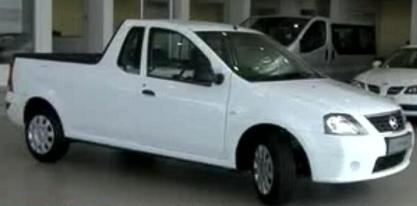
Nissan NP200 (pre-facelift)

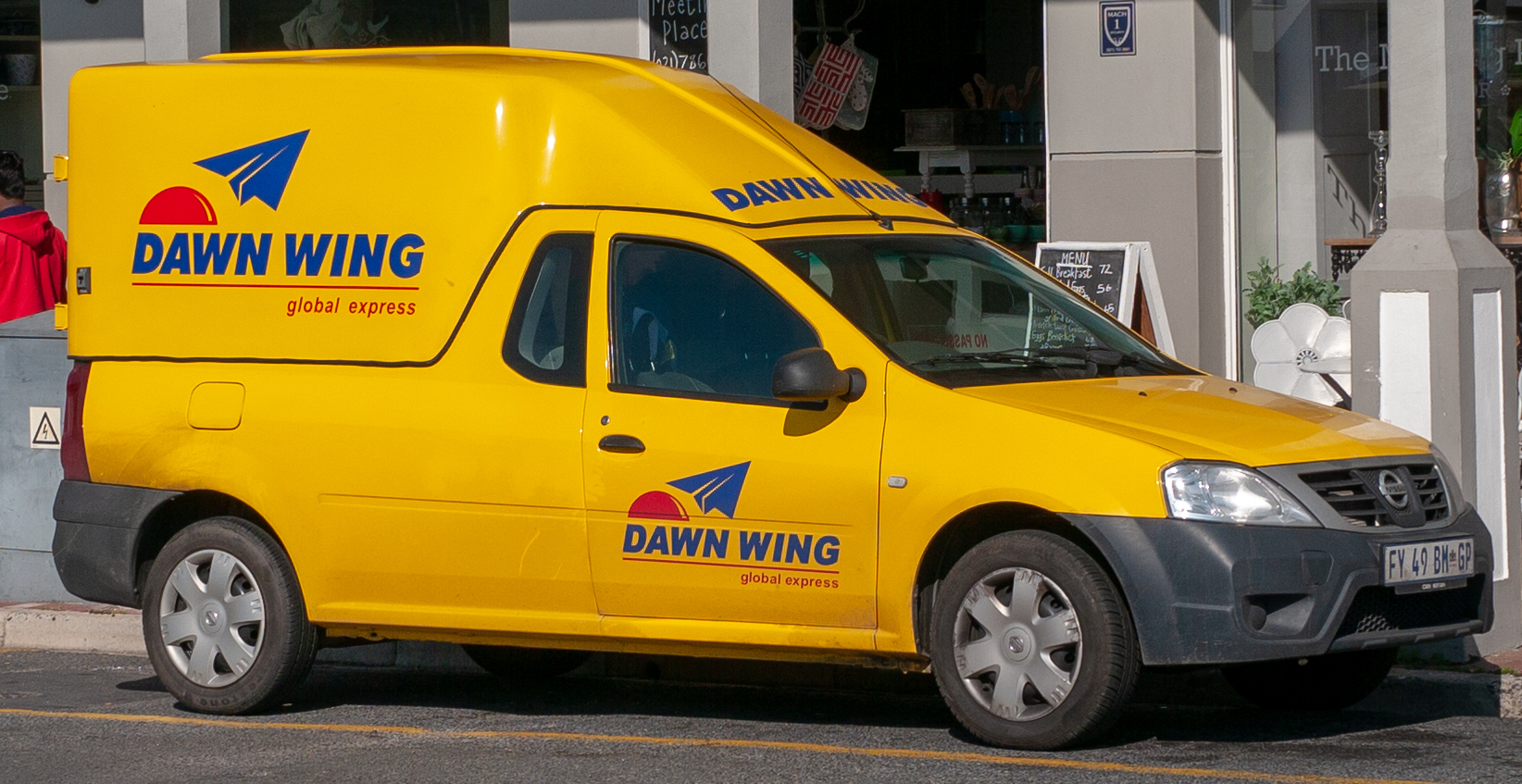
Nissan NP200 (facelift)

== Second generation (L52/K52; 2012) ==
Logan II
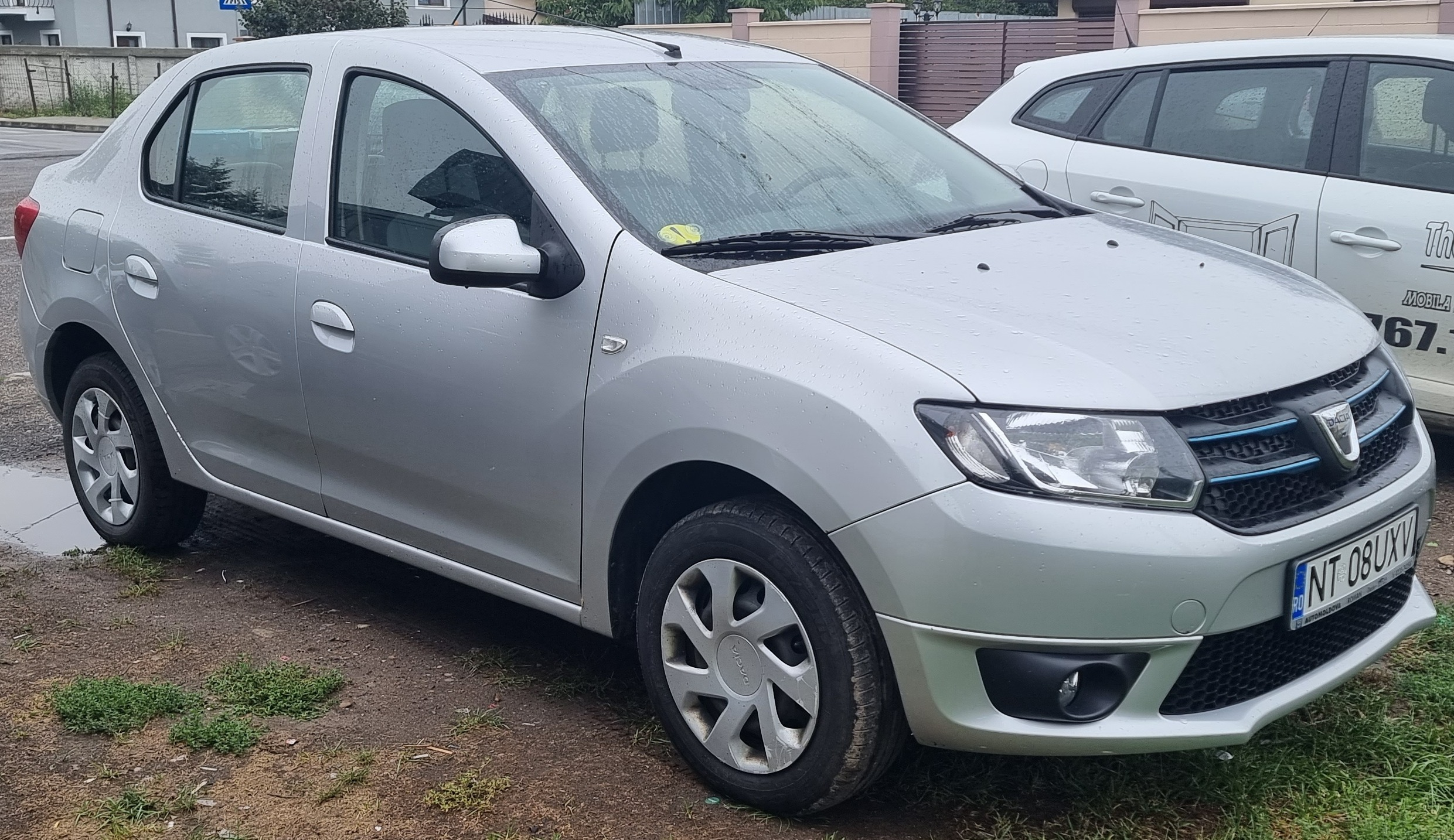

Overview
- Also called: Renault Symbol; Renault Logan
- Production: 2012–2020 (Dacia); 2014–2024 (Brazil); 2014–2022 (Russia); 2021–present (Nigeria)
- Assembly: Romania: Mioveni; Morocco: Casablanca (Somaca); Tangier (Renault-Nissan); Russia: Togliatti (AvtoVAZ); Brazil: São José dos Pinhais (Renault Brazil); Colombia: Envigado (SOFASA); Argentina: Santa Isabel (Renault Argentina); Algeria: Oran (Renault Algérie); Nigeria: Lagos (Coscharis)
- Designer: Erde Tungaa (Renault Design Central Europe)

Body and chassis
- Body style: 4-door saloon 5-door station wagon
- Platform: Dacia M0 platform
- Related: Dacia Sandero II

Powertrain
- Engine: Petrol: 1.0 L H4D sCe I3; 1.2 L 16v D4F I4; 1.6 L K7M I4; Flex-fuel: 1.0 L 16v D4D I4; 1.6 L K7M I4; 1.6 L 16v H4M sCe I4; Petrol/LPG: 0.9 L H4BT I3 tCe; 1.2 L 16v D4F I4; Diesel: 1.5 L K9K dCi I4 turbo
- Transmission: 5-speed manual 4-speed automatic 5/6-speed automated manual (Easy-R); Nissan/Jatco JF015E CVT X-Tronic

Dimensions
- Wheelbase: 2,634 mm (103.7 in) (sedan); 2,635 mm (103.7 in) (station wagon)
- Length: 4,346–4,380 mm (171.1–172.4 in) (sedan); 4,494–4,528 mm (176.9–178.3 in) (station wagon)
- Width: 1,733–1,762 mm (68.2–69.4 in)
- Height: 1,517–1,576 mm (59.7–62.0 in) (sedan); 1,518–1,590 mm (59.8–62.6 in) (station wagon)
- Curb weight: 976–1,268 kg (2,152–2,795 lb)

Chronology
- Successor: Dacia Jogger / Dacia Striker (for Dacia Logan MCV); Renault Taliant (for Renault Logan/Symbol)

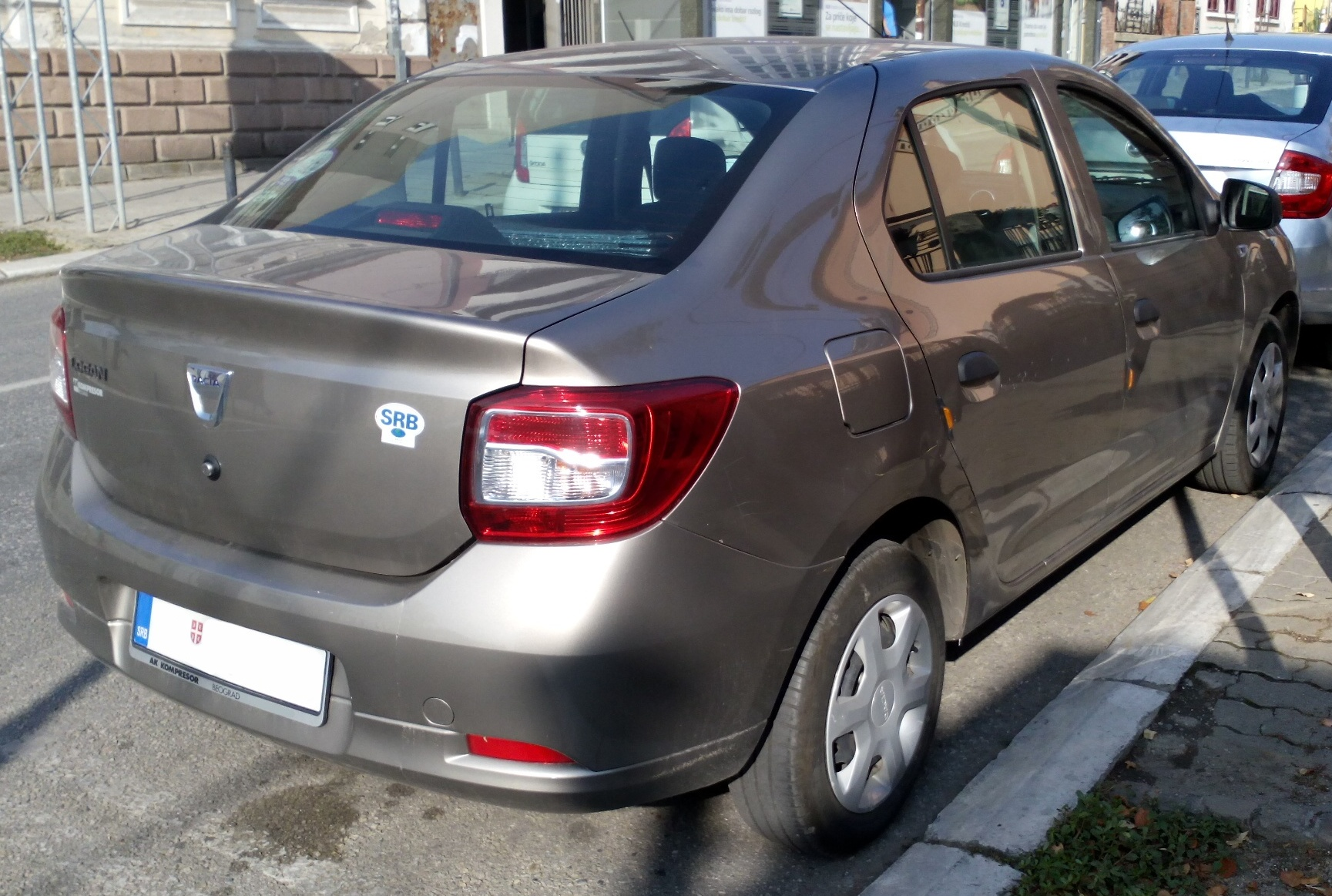
Rear view (pre-facelift)

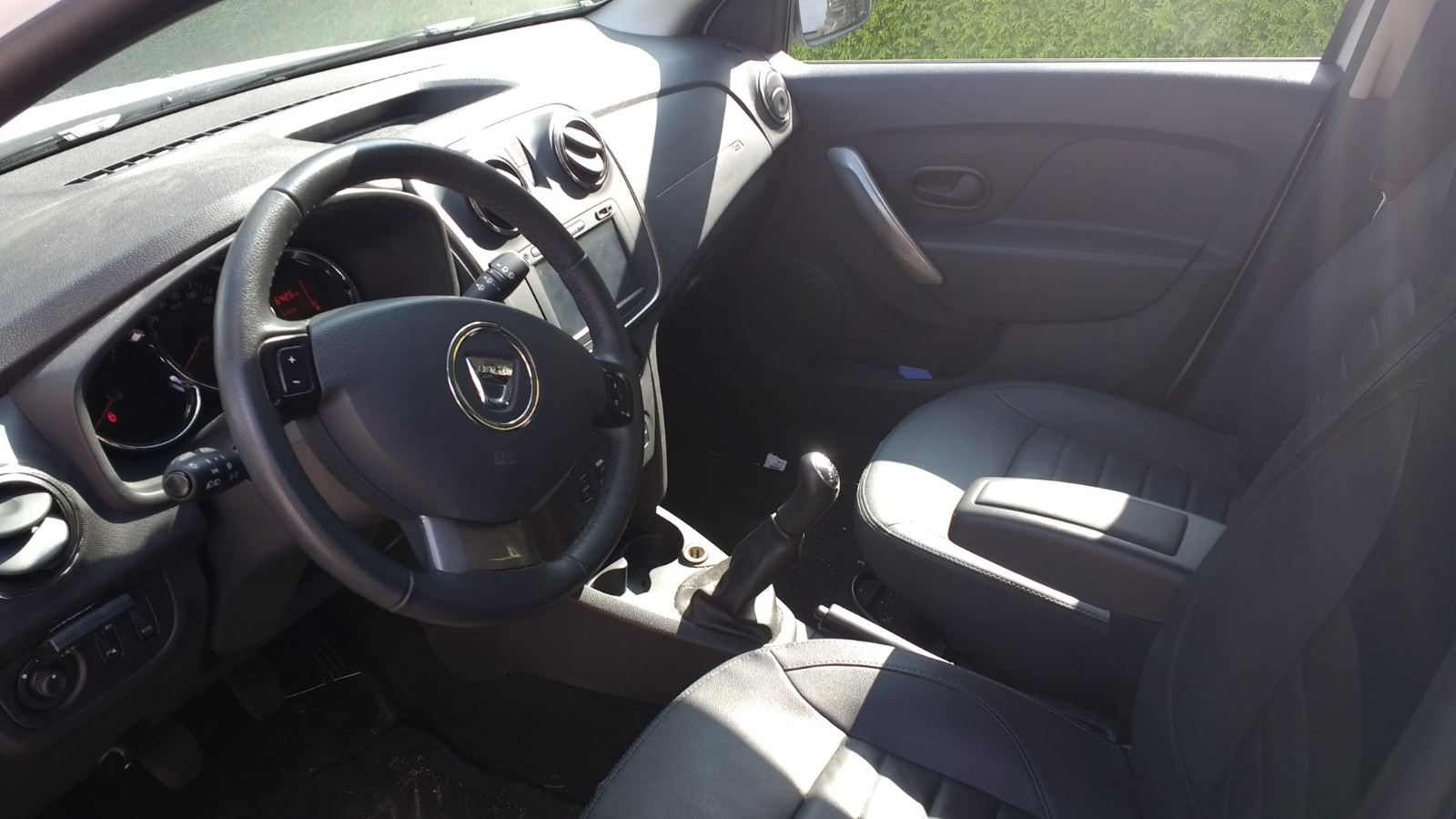
Interior

The second generation Logan was revealed by Dacia at the 2012 Paris Motor Show. Official photos with the new Logan were released on 17 September 2012. It shares the same front end design with the second generation Sandero, also revealed at the motor show, as well as other elements too.

According to Dacia, 60% of the design work was carried out in Romania, at Renault's engineering centre.

=== Features ===
Among the new features introduced with the new model there was a new three-cylinder turbocharged 0.9-litre petrol engine and capable of developing 90 hp (67 kW) and 135 N⋅m (100 lb⋅ft). The other two engine options are the 1.2-litre 16-valve petrol engine, initially available also as an LPG variant, and the 1.5-litre diesel engine, available with two power outputs. Their performance figures are predominantly similar to the ones of the second generation Sandero. Later, the 1.2-litre LPG variant was discontinued, in favor of the 0.9 TCe, as the first did not meet the new Euro 6 emission standards.

Another addition was the Media Nav system, already introduced earlier in the same year on the Lodgy, consisting of a 7-inch touchscreen display with multimedia functions and a navigation software included. Other new features are speed limiter, cruise control, rear parking sensors, and front and side airbags, as well as ABS and ESP, as standard. The interior has been significantly revised, with new chromed elements added, and the hood is now supported with a strut. A new Eco button, placed on the dashboard, limits the engine revs to 4,000 rpm.

At the end of 2014, Dacia started to produce Euro 6 engines, with reduced exhaust emissions. From August 2015, the 0.9 TCe engine is equipped with the Start & Stop system.

Starting from the end of 2016, the Dacia Logan range is offered with the Dacia Easy-R automated manual transmission (AMT).

=== Variants ===
In the European market, the new Logan is available in different trim levels: Access, Ambiance, Laureate, Stepway, Prestige. The Access level comes with black bumpers and power steering, and is available only with the 1.2-litre engine. Ambiance has body-coloured bumpers, wheel covers, Eco mode function, power lock doors, front power windows or CD player, and as options there are metallic paint, fog lights and air conditioning. Laureate adds body-coloured door handles, fog lights as standard and trip computer, and additionally can be ordered with metallic paint, Media Nav system, leather upholstery, parking sensors, cruise control or alloy wheels. This is the only equipment level available for the 90 hp (67 kW) version of the 1.5-litre diesel engine.

In June 2014, a limited edition was made available in order to celebrate 10 years since the model's launch. There will be produced only 2,000 units of this version, which features new equipment such as automatic air conditioning, double optic fog lights, mirror-mounted repeaters, 16-inch wheels, along with several special design elements like the different dashboard lighting (white instead of the then usual amber colour). This model was only available on the Romanian market and came equipped with 1.2 16v petrol and 1.5 dci diesel engines, both having 75 bhp.

In October 2015, Dacia launched the new Prestige trim level, which has automatic air conditioning, mirror-mounted repeaters and 16-inch wheels.

=== Logan MCV ===
The estate version of the car made its debut at the 2013 Geneva Motor Show. The car will keep the MCV name, although it now stands for Maximum Capacity Vehicle, rather than the previous Multi Convivial Vehicle. It has 5 seats and a luggage capacity between 573 litres (20.2 cu ft) and 1,518 litres (53.6 cu ft), featuring the same standard equipment and engine range as the saloon. It began to be marketed from the second half of 2013.

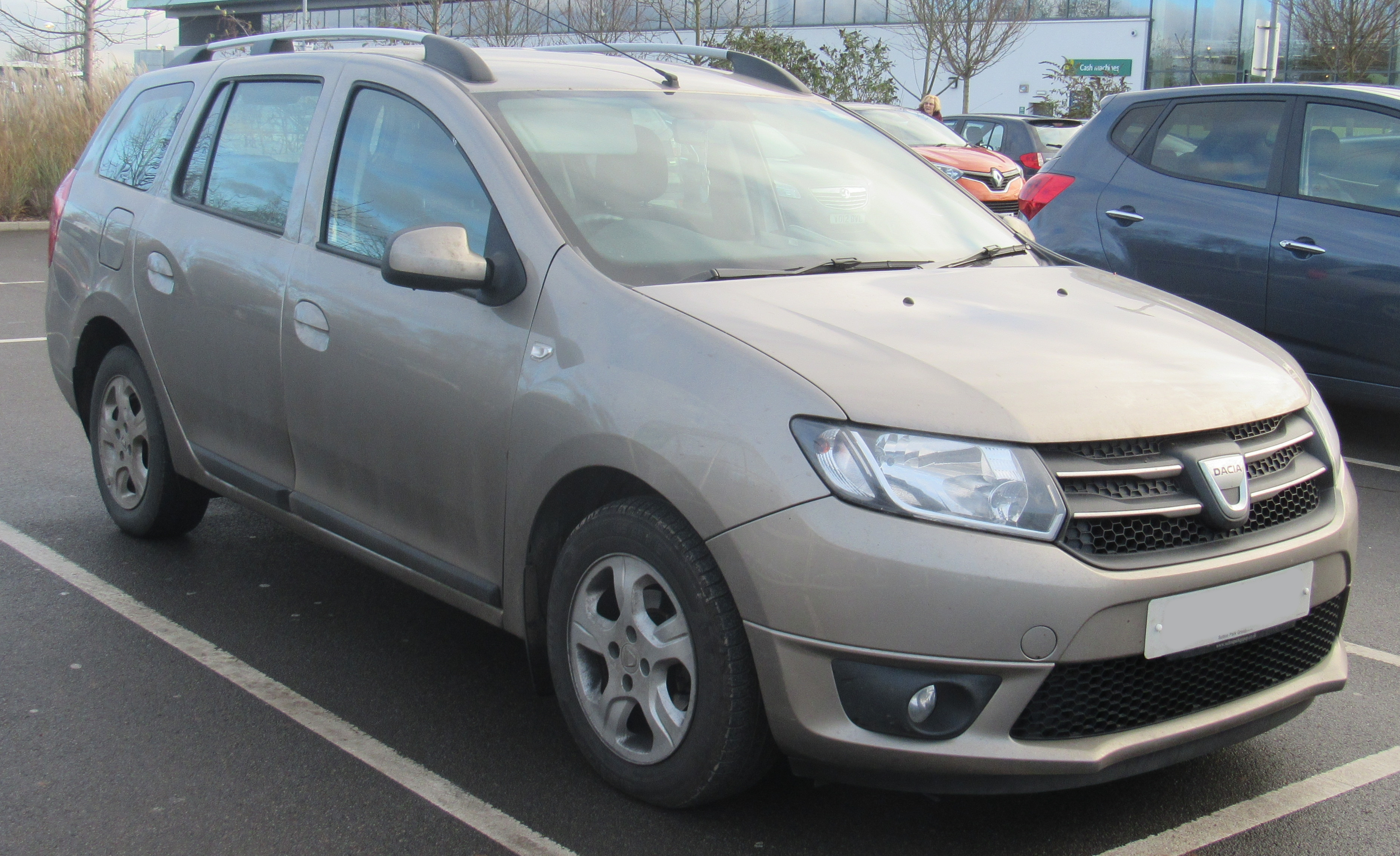
Dacia Logan MCV (pre-facelift)

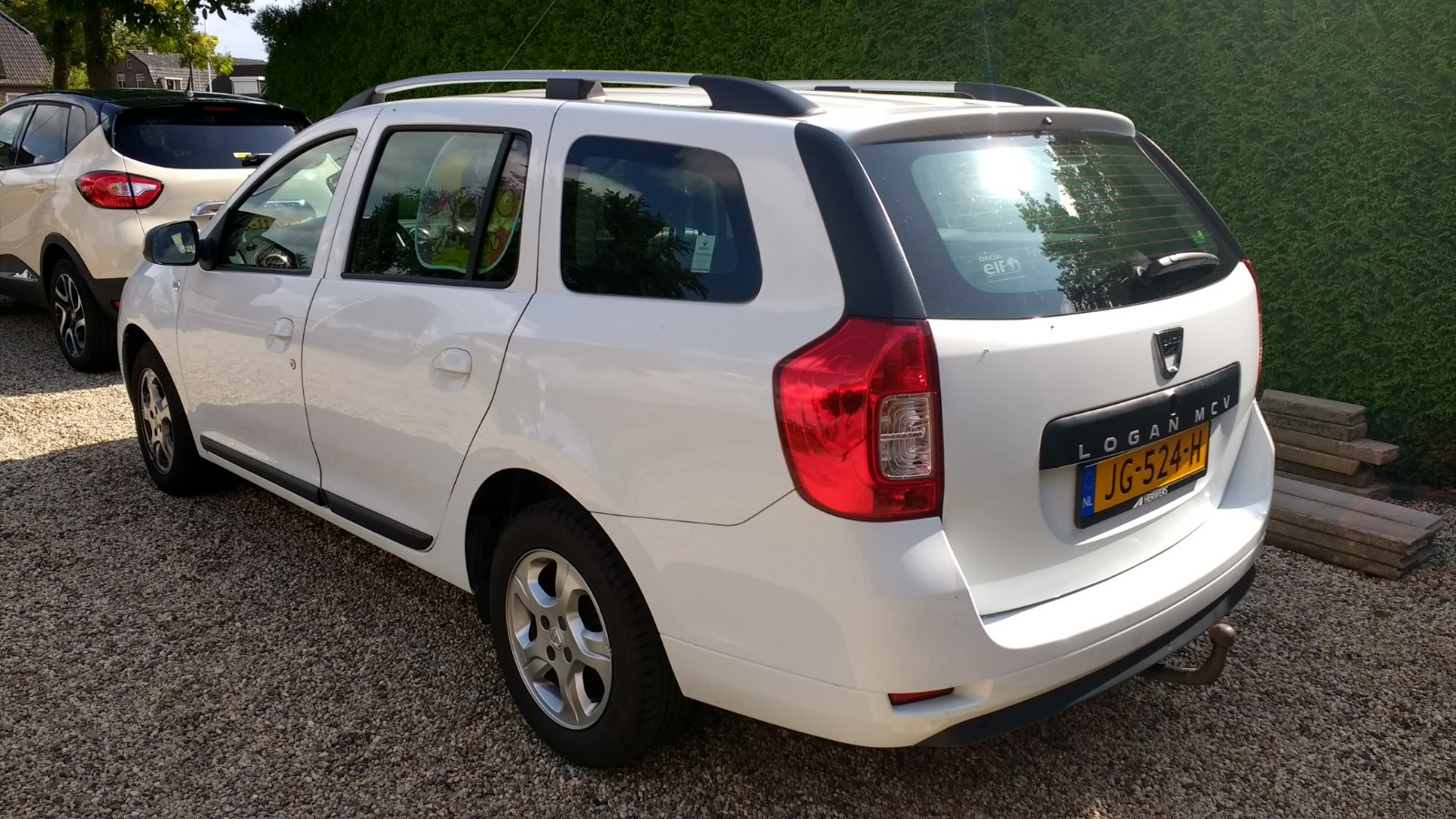
Dacia Logan MCV (pre-facelift)

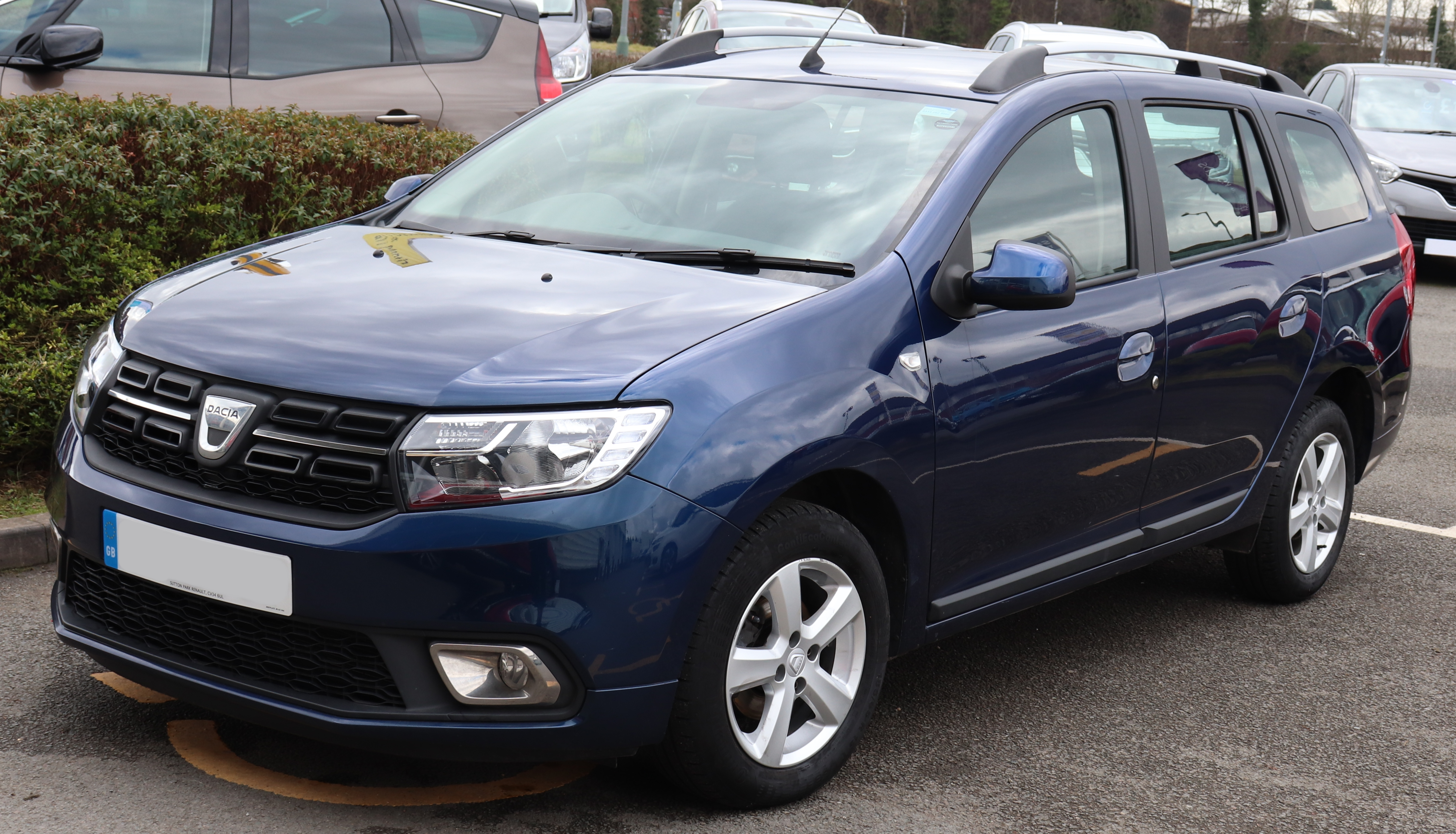
Dacia Logan MCV (2016 facelift)

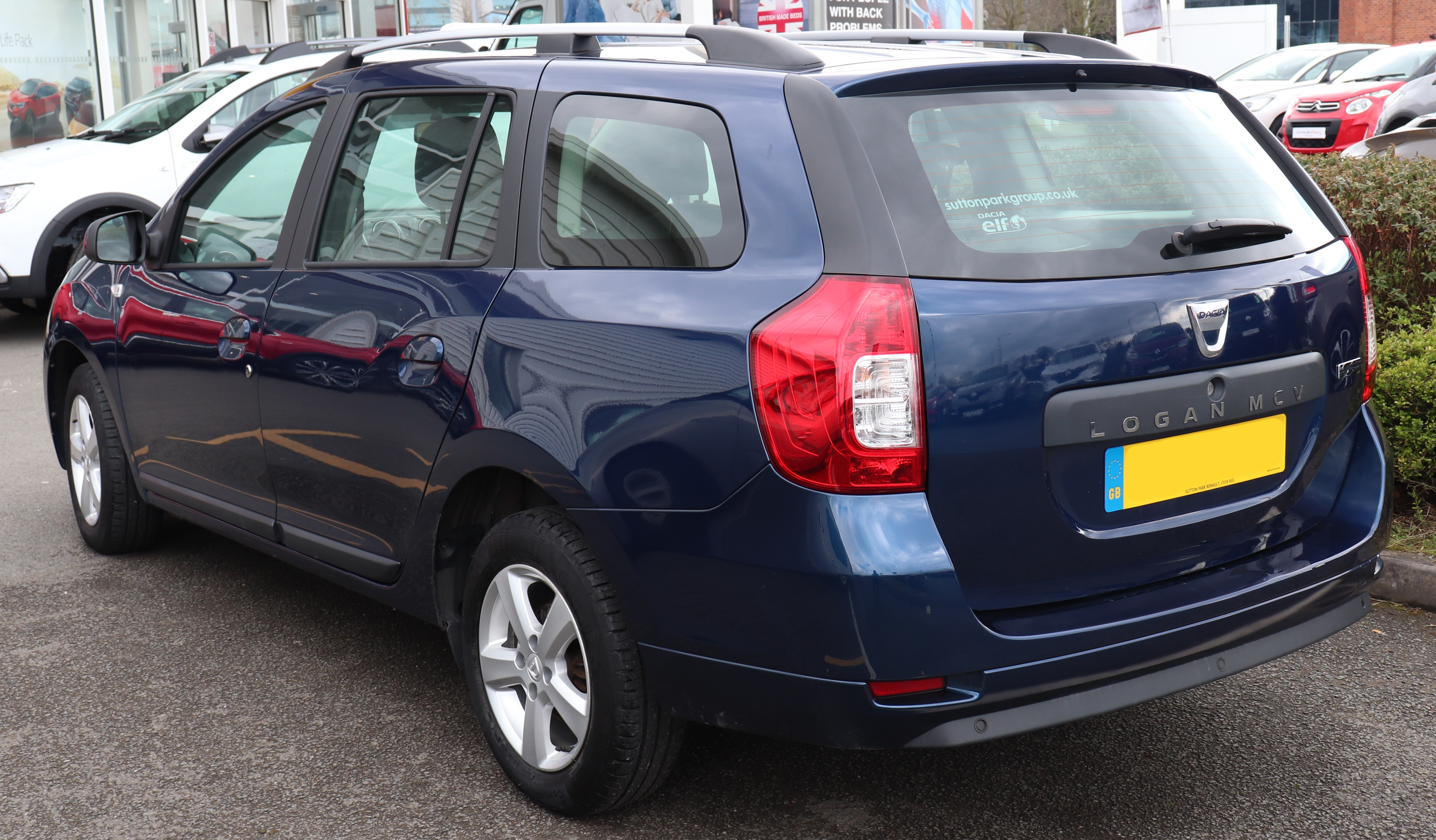
Dacia Logan MCV (2016 facelift)

=== Facelift ===
Dacia presented the new Logan facelift at the 2016 Paris Motor Show. The Romanian car manufacturer models have a new design, a new steering wheel and a new 1.0-litre engine.

The Dacia designers wanted to give a new look for the Dacia models and the front side comes with several new features. The front and back bumpers have been slightly redesigned and the headlights have a new design that includes LED day running lights (it is the first time that Dacia models offer LED lights). The aesthetic package is completed by a new front grille, similar to the one found on the Duster.

The interior changes include a four-spoke steering wheel that includes the horn, new buttons and new chrome lines to suggest a new look. There is also a new glossy plastic that covers the dashboard and fits better with the "MediaNav" multimedia system that has received an updated interface with a better resolution.

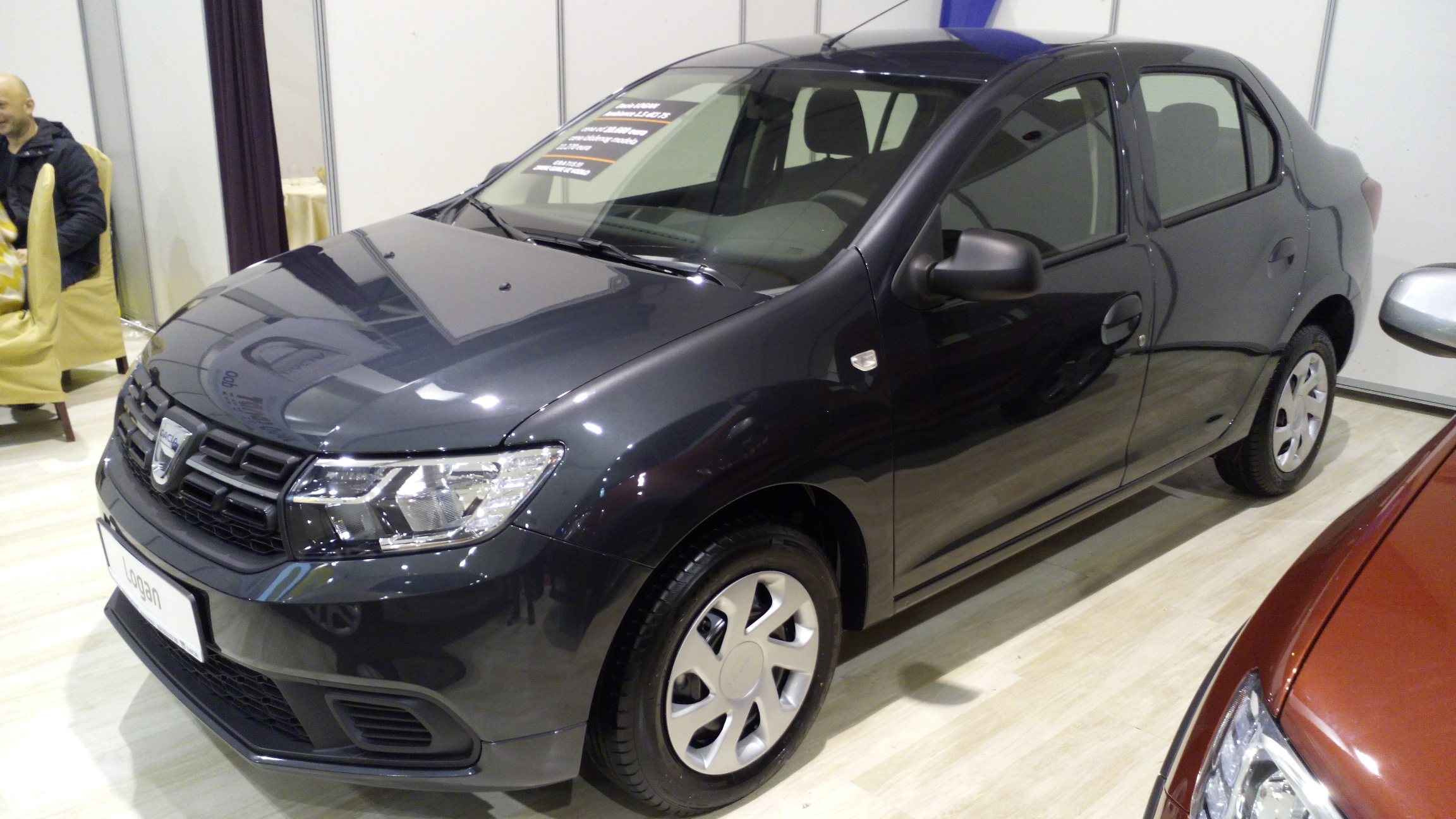
Dacia Logan sedan (2016 facelift)

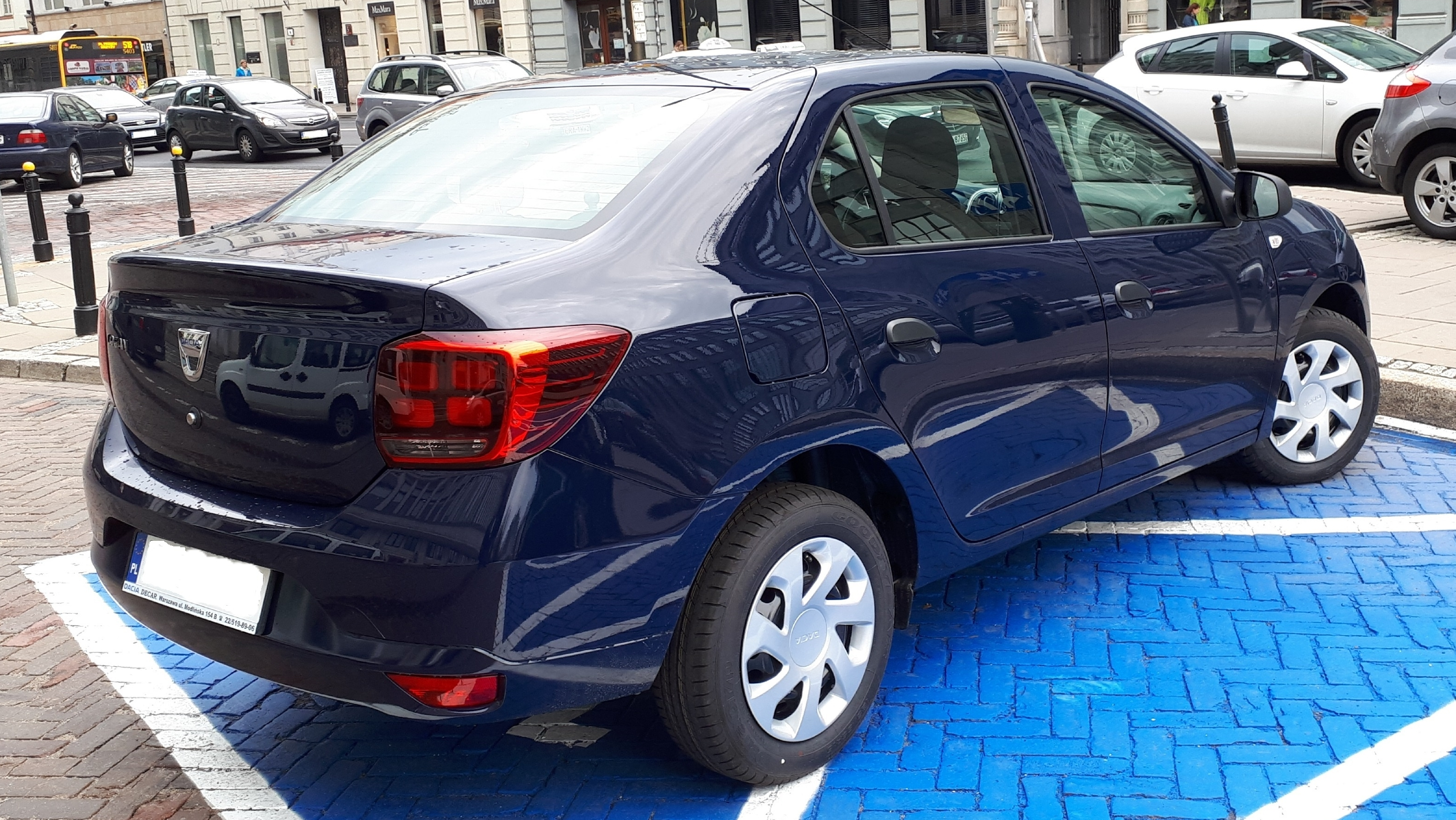
Dacia Logan sedan (2016 facelift)

=== Logan Stepway/Intens ===
Since the release of the facelift version, the Logan is also available with the crossover-styled Stepway trim, which feature raised ride height and adds exterior accessories such as black plastic wheel arch trims, body cladding, skid plates and roof rails. In February 2017, the Dacia Logan MCV Stepway in Europe. Starting from 2018, the Stepway version also became available for the sedan version in Latin America, and from November 2019 in Europe. The Renault Logan Stepway was launched in Russia in December 2018, followed by Brazil in July 2019 along with the facelifted model without carrying the Stepway nameplate to avoid confusion with the Sandero-based Stepway. In several South American markets including Colombia, the crossover version of the Renault Logan was available as the Intens top trim.

For versions equipped with CVT, the lifted version of the Logan is essentially a workaround to mitigate the fact that the CVT gearbox does not fit due to the tight space of the platform layout, which led to the vehicle being raised by fitting a reworked suspension. Without raising the ground clearance, the CVT unit would be too close to the ground and causes a risk of damage.

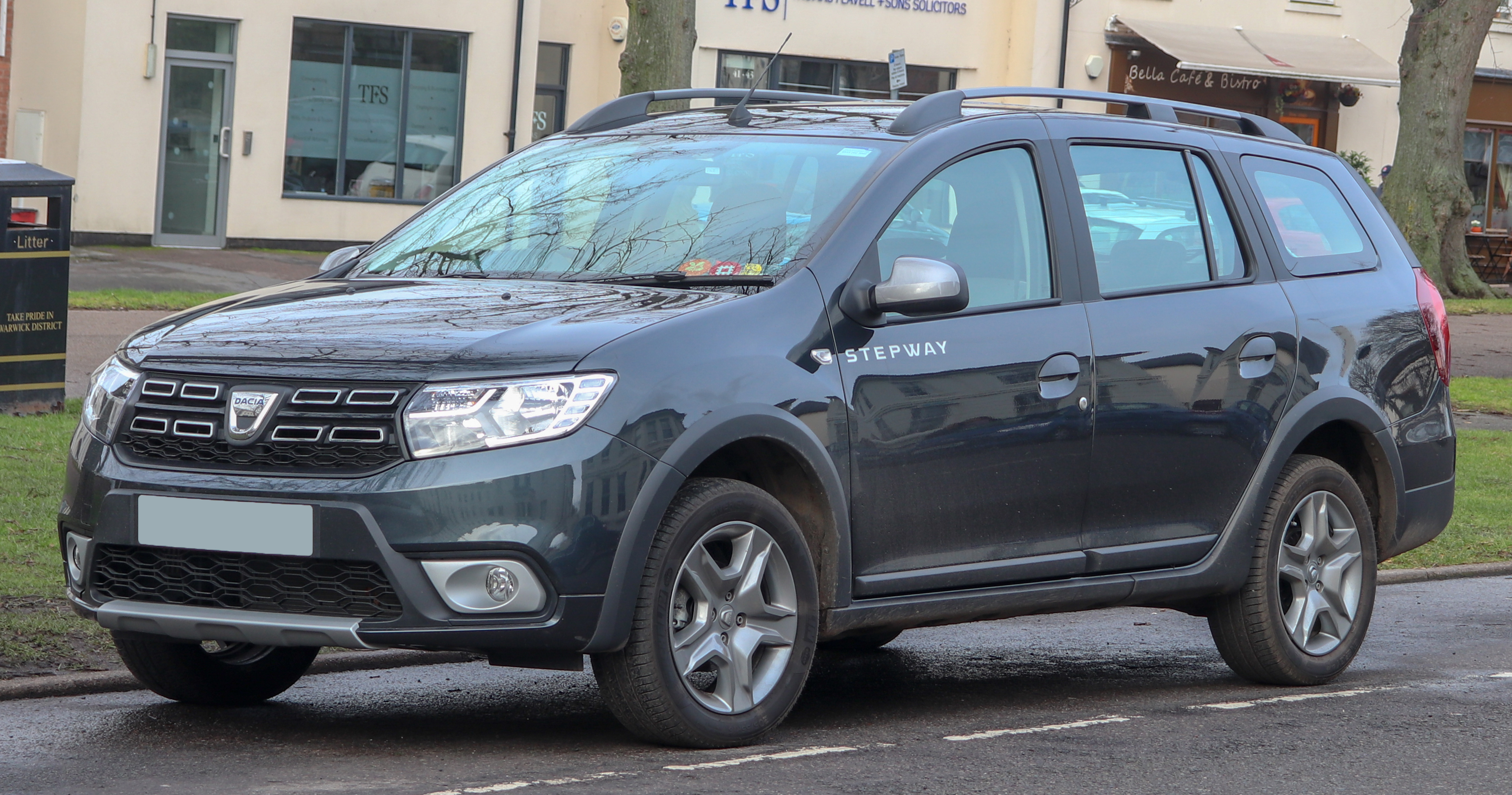
Dacia Logan MCV Stepway (UK)

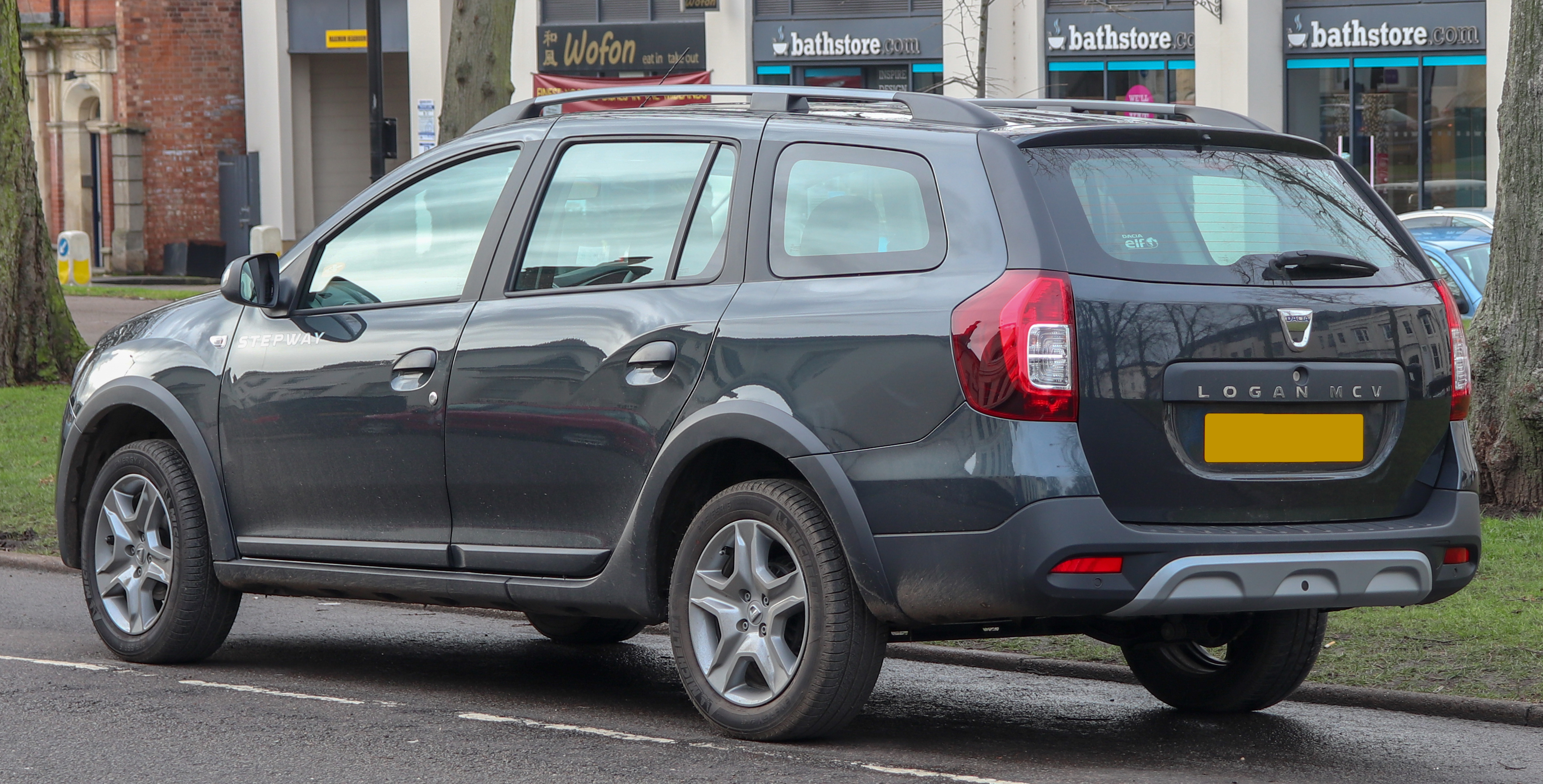
Dacia Logan MCV Stepway (UK)

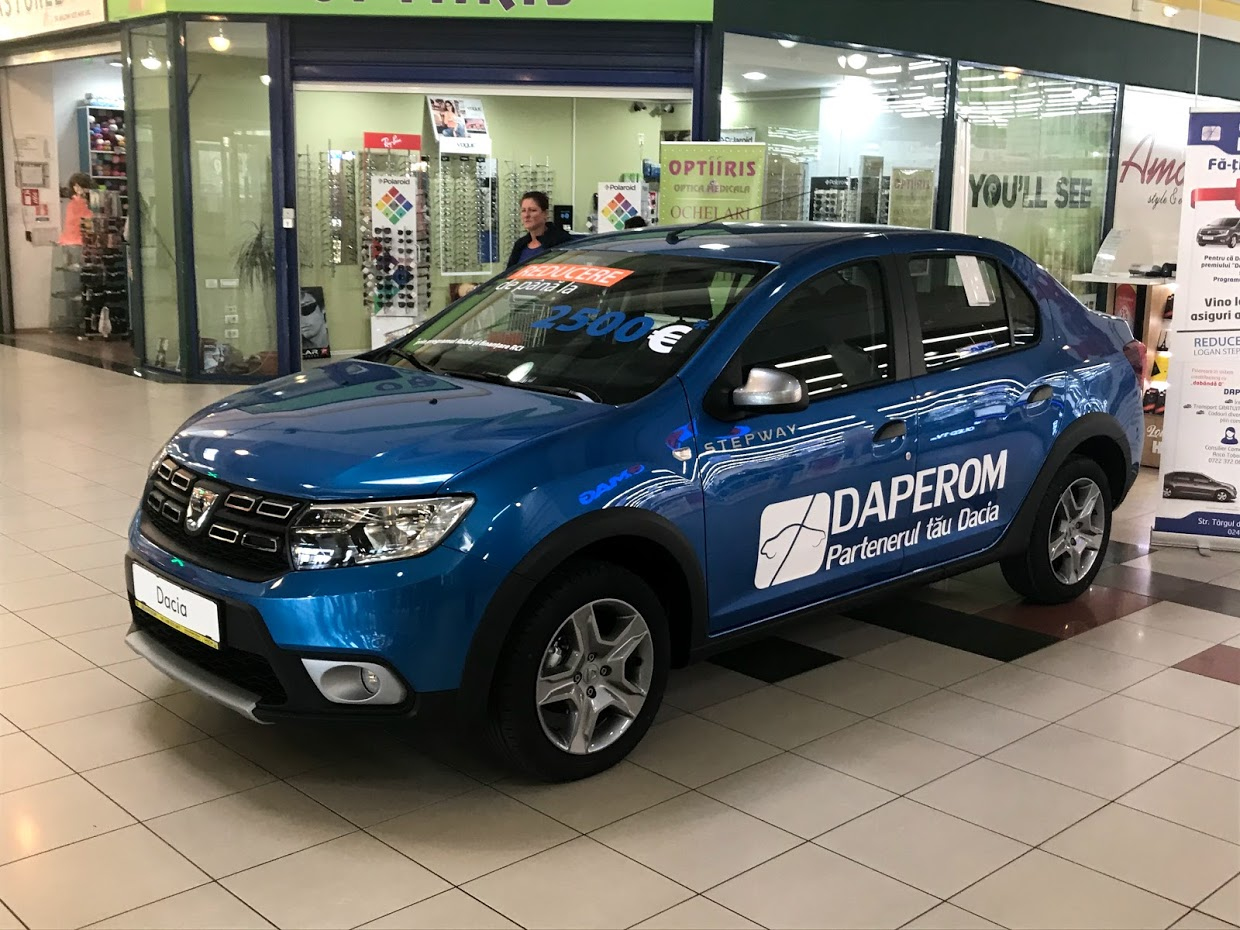
Dacia Logan Stepway (Romania)

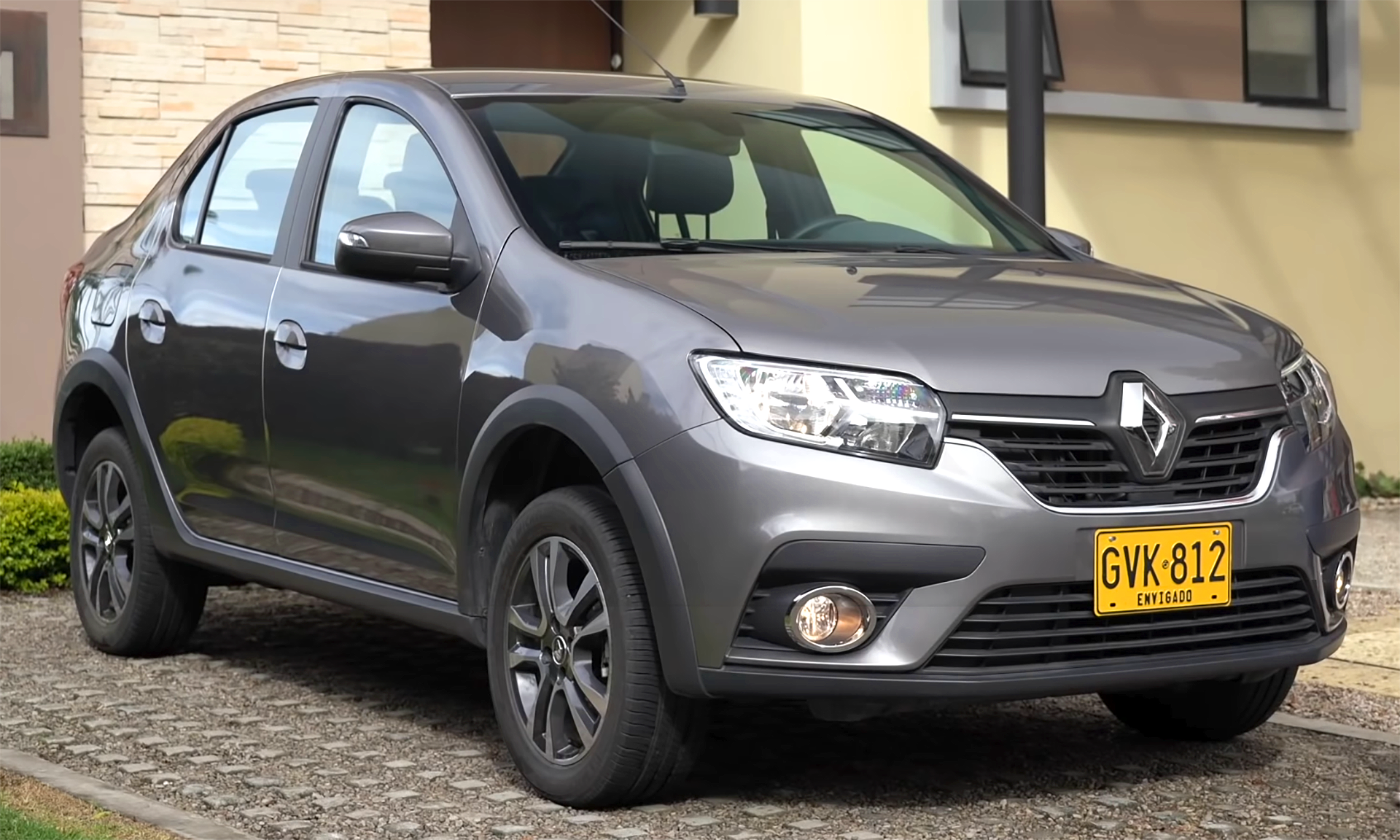
2020 Renault Logan Intens (Colombia)

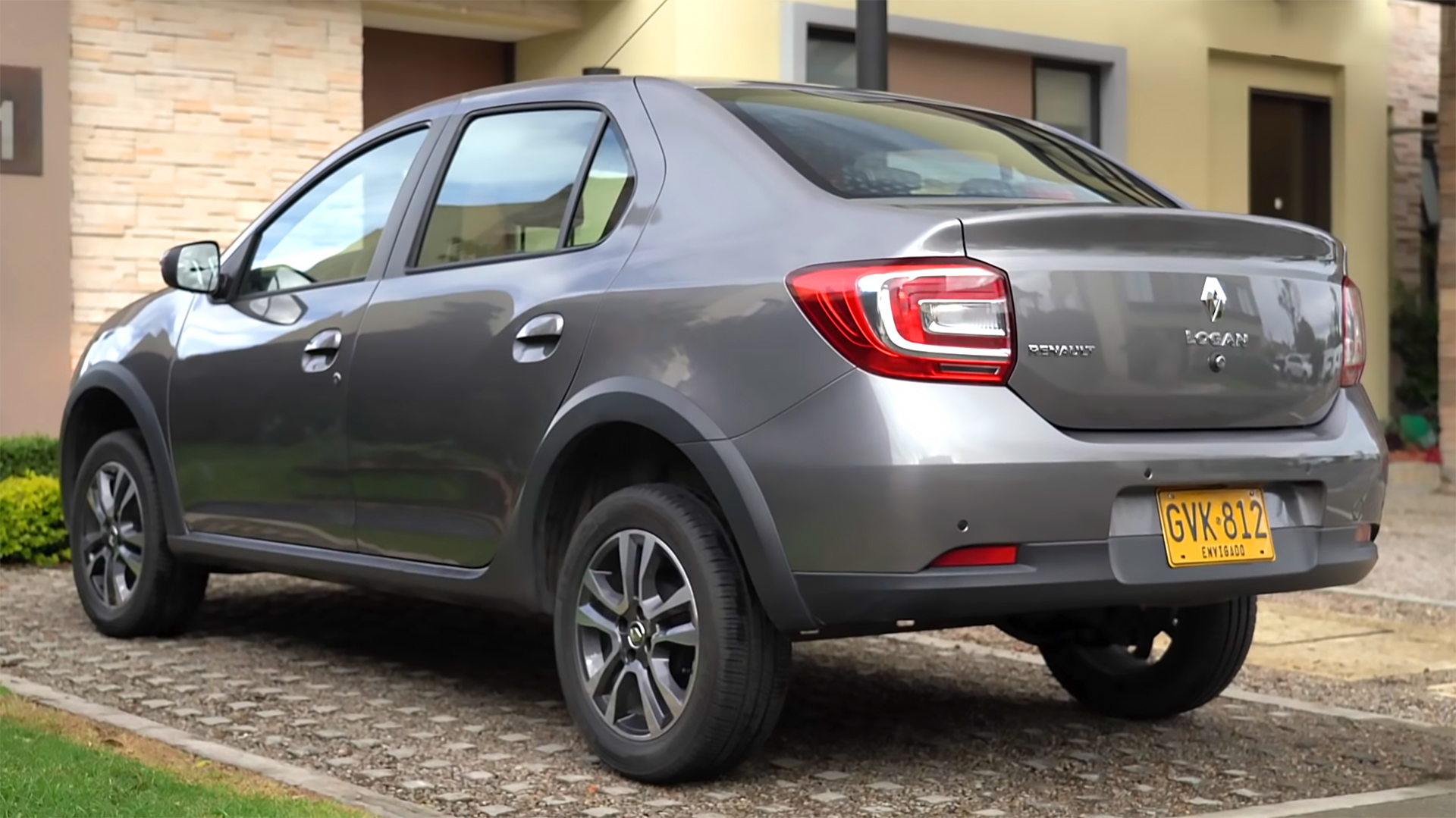
2020 Renault Logan Intens (Colombia)

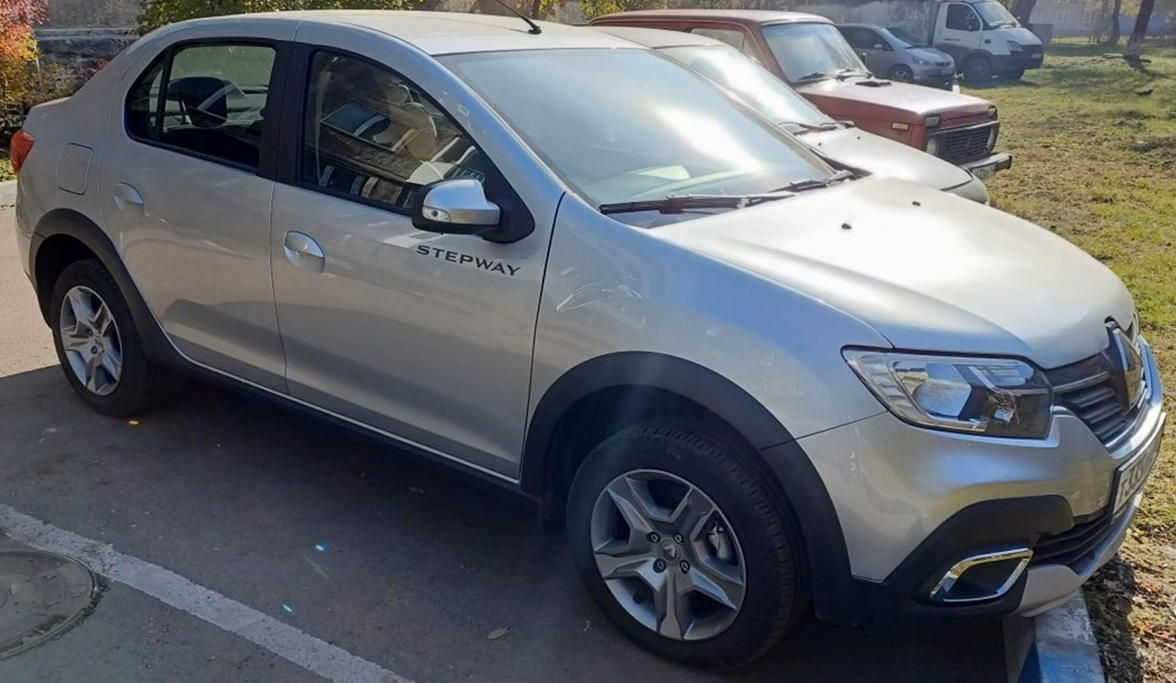
2021 Renault Logan Stepway (Russia)

=== Marketing and production ===
Sales in Romania began in November 2012, with a starting price of €6,690. It is manufactured in Mioveni, Romania, and in Casablanca, Morocco, at the Somaca factory, for the North African market. There will be no seven-seat or panel van versions of the second generation Logan, as they have been replaced by the Lodgy and the Dokker respectively.

The saloon version was also launched in South America, as the second generation Renault Logan, in December 2013, after being revealed at the Buenos Aires Motor Show in June 2013. It is manufactured at the Renault Brazil factory in São José dos Pinhais (near Curitiba).

In March 2014, it was launched in Russia (where it is marketed as the Renault Logan). The model is produced at the AvtoVAZ facility in Togliatti, Samara.

Also in 2014, the model was launched in Egypt (as the Renault Logan), together with the second generation of the Sandero and Sandero Stepway.

Production of the Logan started in Algeria in November 2014. Sold as the Renault Symbol, the SKD assembly of the car at the Renault Algérie plant in Oran lasted until 2020, when the plant was closed due to new regulations surrounding the assembly of cars in Algeria. Although production temporarily restarted in 2021 before stopping shortly after, as of 2025, the plant remains closed due to ongoing disputes between Renault and the Algerian government.

In August 2015, the new Logan was presented in Colombia, with the pre-sale of a thousand units. It is manufactured in Envigado at the Renault SOFASA factory.

In 2021, Coscharis Motors started SKD assembly in Awoyaya, Lagos (Nigeria).

Production in Cordoba, Argentina stopped in December 2025.

==== Turkey ====
The third generation Renault Symbol is a rebadged version of the second generation Logan. It was revealed at the 2012 Istanbul Motor Show, It went on sale on the Turkish market at the beginning of 2013, also being released in Tunisia, Algeria, the Middle East, and Chile, but not Morocco.

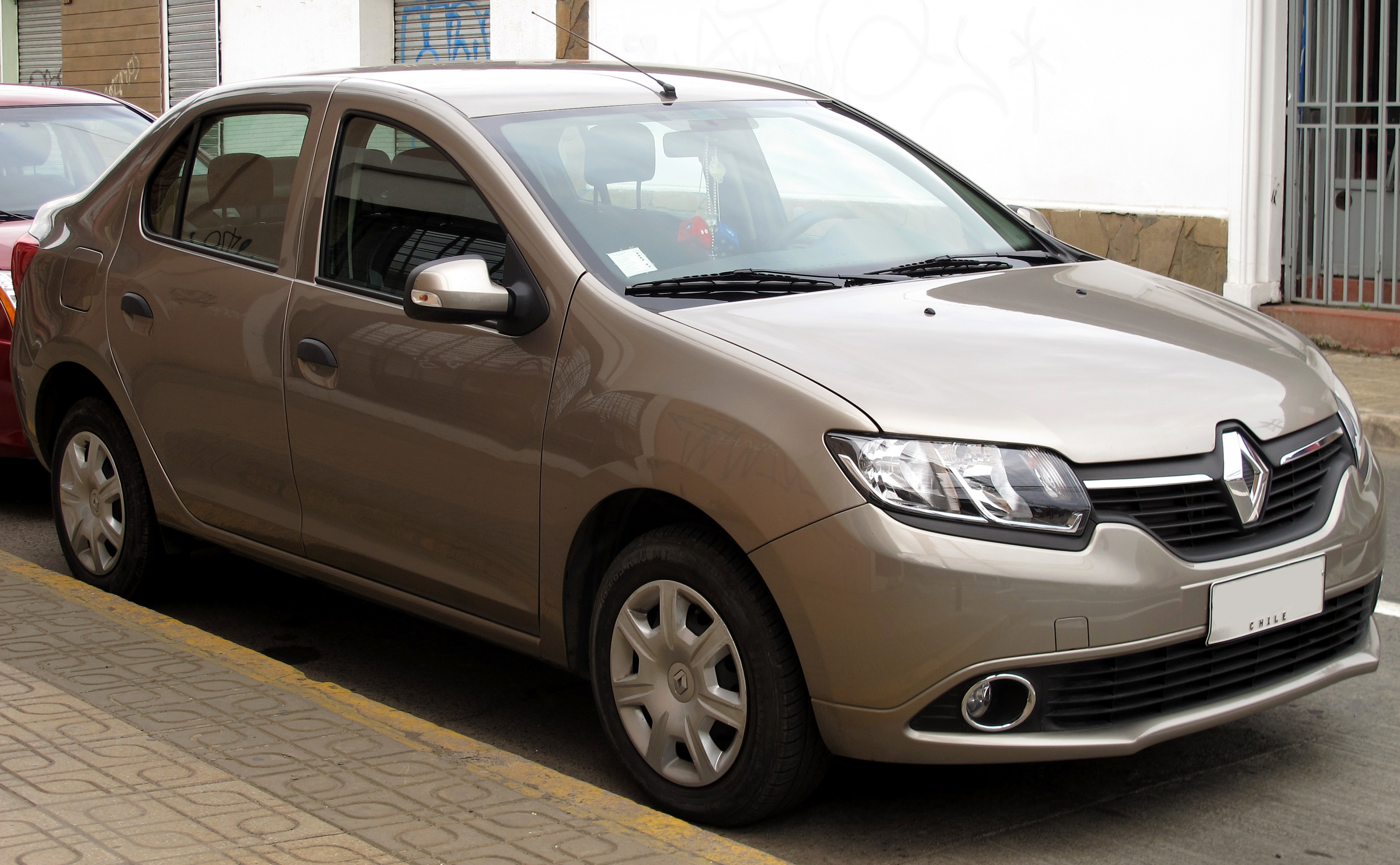
Renault Symbol (pre-facelift)

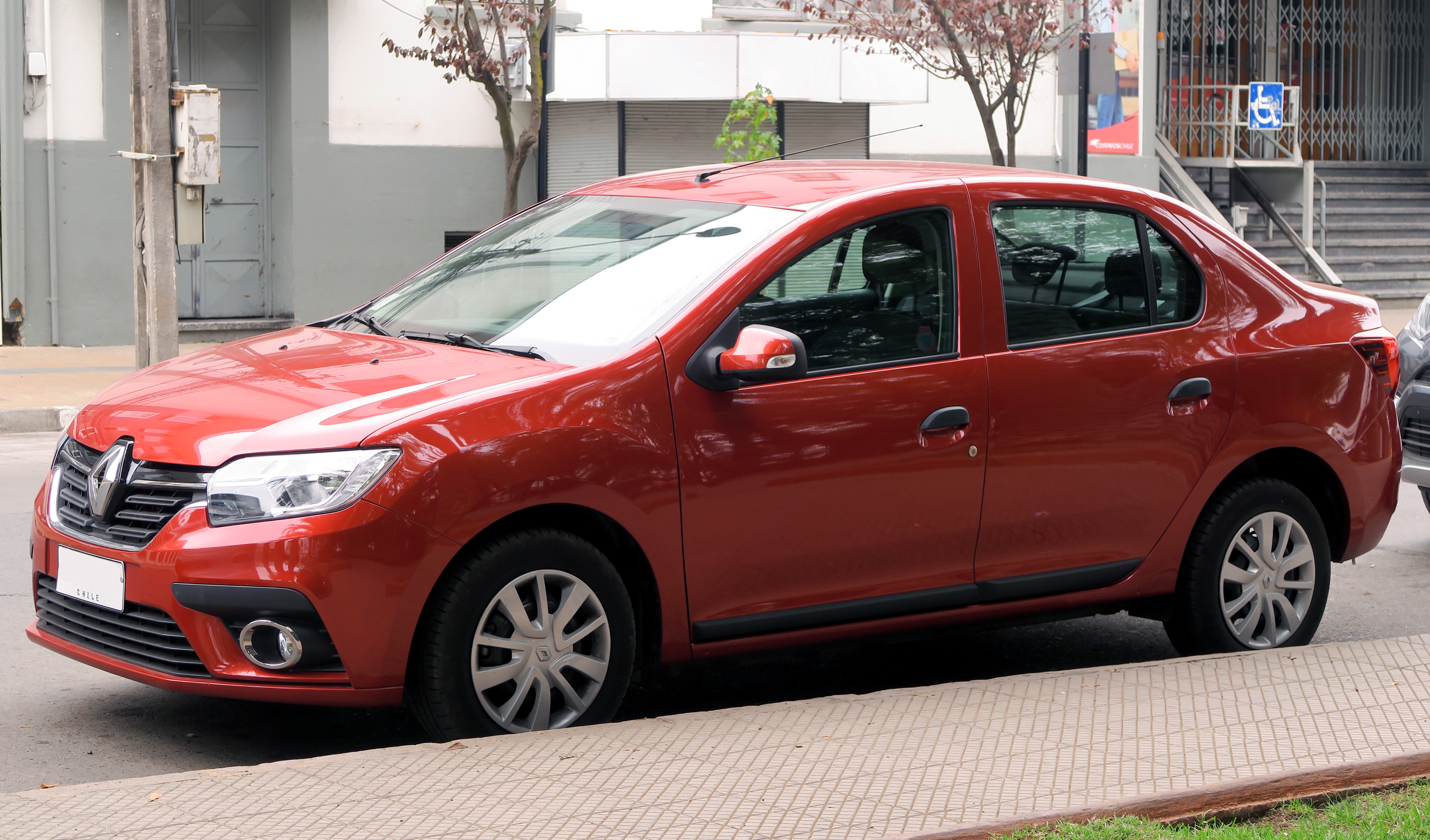
Renault Symbol (2017 facelift)

=== Safety ===
The Renault Logan has solid front disc brakes and rear drum brakes.

==== Latin NCAP ====
The Logan in its most basic Latin American market configuration with 2 airbags and no ESC received 1 star for adult occupants and 3 stars for toddlers from Latin NCAP in 2018 (one level above 2010–2015).

Latin NCAP 2.0 test results Renault Sandero / Logan + 2 Airbags (2018, based on Euro NCAP 2008)
Test	Points	Stars
Adult occupant:	18.01/34.0	1 /5 stars
Child occupant:	28.97/49.00	3 /5 stars

The Logan in its most basic Latin American market configuration with 4 airbags and no ESC received 1 star for adult occupants and 4 stars for toddlers from Latin NCAP in 2019.

Latin NCAP 2.0 test results Renault Sandero / Logan / Stepway + 4 Airbags * (2019, based on Euro NCAP 2008)
Test	Points	Stars
Adult occupant:	23.28/34.0	1 /5 stars
Child occupant:	38.52/49.00	4 /5 stars

The updated Logan in its most basic Latin American market configuration with 4 airbags received 3 stars for adult occupants and 4 stars for toddlers from Latin NCAP in 2019.

Latin NCAP 2.0 test results Renault Sandero / Logan / Stepway + 4 Airbags ** (2019, based on Euro NCAP 2008)
Test	Points	Stars
Adult occupant:	23.40/34.0	3 /5 stars
Child occupant:	38.52/49.00	4 /5 stars

The updated Logan in its most basic Latin American market configuration received 0 stars from Latin NCAP in 2024 (similar to Euro NCAP 2014).

Latin NCAP 3.5 test results Renault Sandero / Logan / Stepway + 4 Airbags (2024, similar to Euro NCAP 2017)
Test	Points	%
Overall:	0 /5 stars	
Adult occupant:	13.13	33%
Child occupant:	30.00	61%
Pedestrian:	22.22	46%
Safety assist:	0.00	0%

== Third generation (LJI; 2020) ==
Logan III
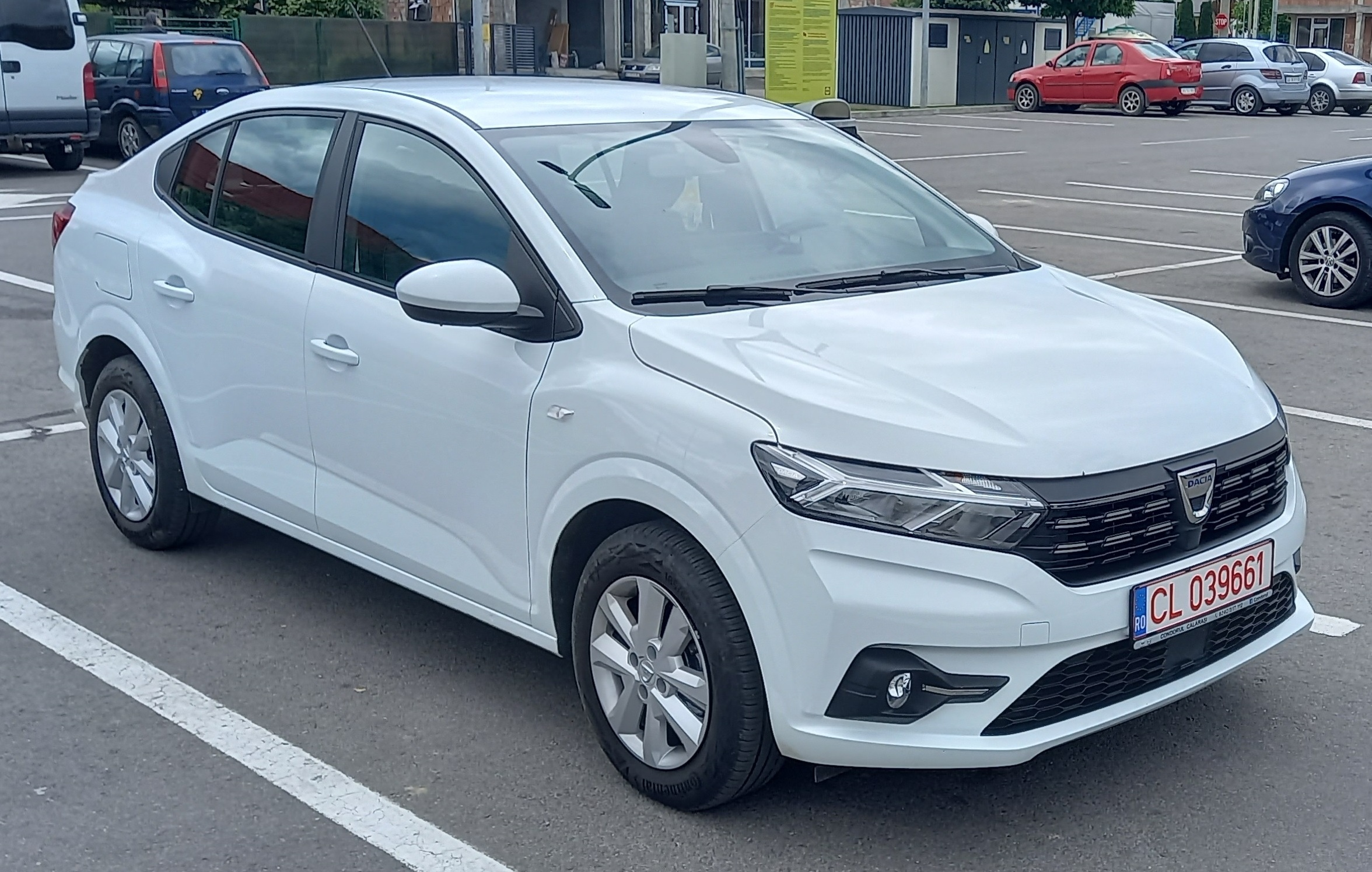

Overview
- Model code: LJI; LJF (Renault Taliant)
- Also called: Renault Taliant (2021–2025)
- Production: 2020–present 2021–2025 (Renault Taliant)
- Assembly: Romania: Mioveni 2020-2025; Morocco: Casablanca (Somaca)
- Designer: Renault Technocentre & Renault Technologie Roumanie

Body and chassis
- Body style: 4-door saloon
- Platform: Renault–Nissan CMF-B LS platform
- Related: Dacia Sandero III; Dacia Jogger; Renault Kardian; Lada Iskra

Powertrain
- Engine: Petrol: 1.0 L H4D sCe 65 I3 12V; 1.0 L H4Dt tCe 90 I3 12V; Petrol/LPG: 1.0 L H4Dt tCe ECO-G 100 I3 12V; Diesel: 1.5 L K9K dCi I4 8V turbo
- Transmission: 5/6-speed manual CVT

Dimensions
- Wheelbase: 2,649 mm (104.3 in)
- Length: 4,396 mm (173.1 in)
- Width: 1,848 mm (72.8 in)
- Height: 1,501 mm (59.1 in)

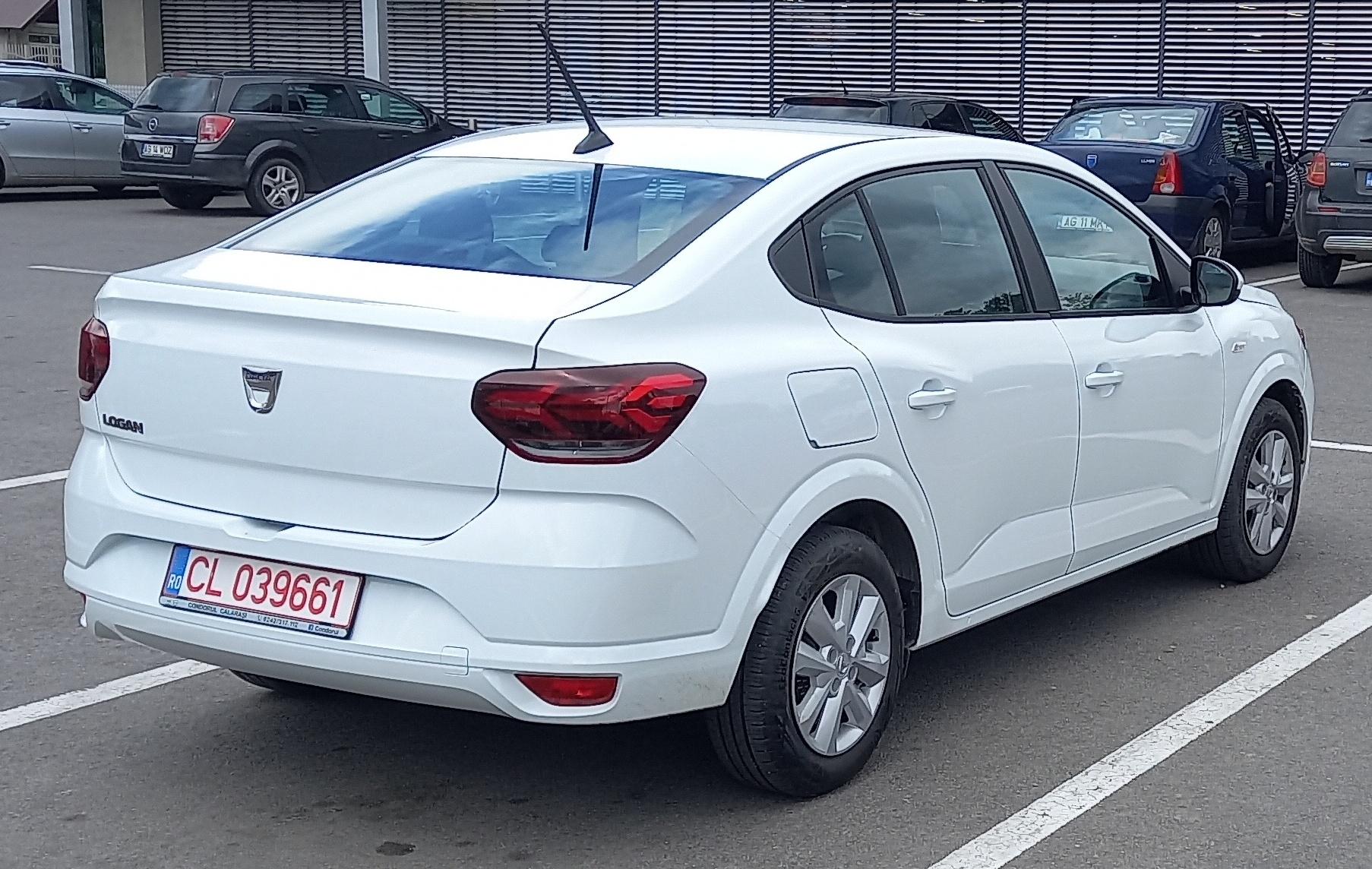
Rear view

The third-generation Logan was launched together with the new Dacia Sandero III, on 29 September 2020. It is longer by 36 mm (1.4 in), supported by a longer wheelbase and a reduced rear overhang. It has a slimmer shape, featuring a more sloping windscreen and a roof lowered by 10 mm (0.4 in).

It is built on a CMF-B LS modular platform used by the new Sandero, and is claimed to combine greater strength and rigidity with less weight while complying with more stringent crash-test. The new powertrain reduces emissions, and as of 2021 is compliant with pollution control requirements.

=== 2022 refresh ===
In June 2022, the Logan received a slight update incorporating the brand's new logo alongside other Dacia models. To accommodate the new logo, the grille is redesigned.

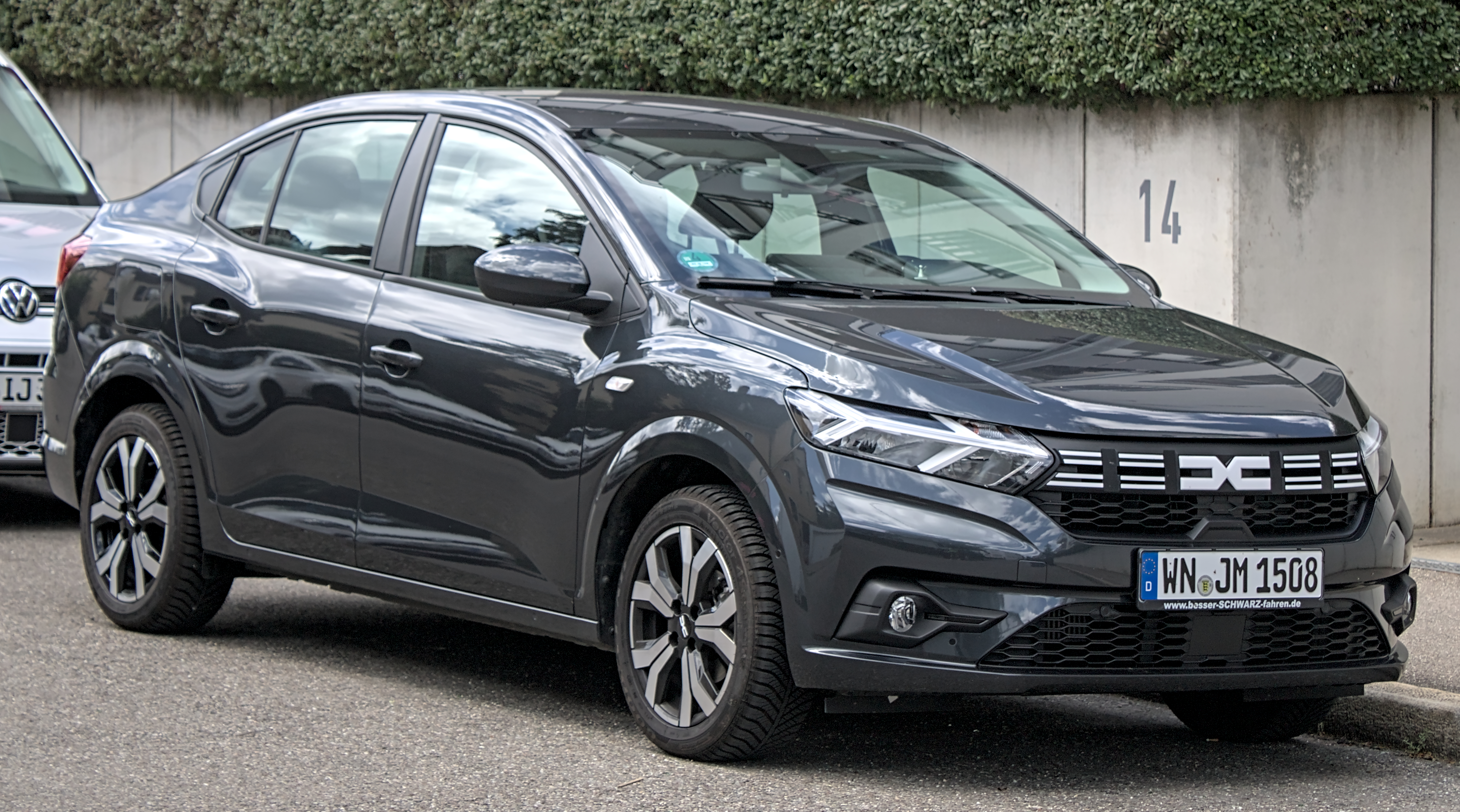
Facelift (front view)

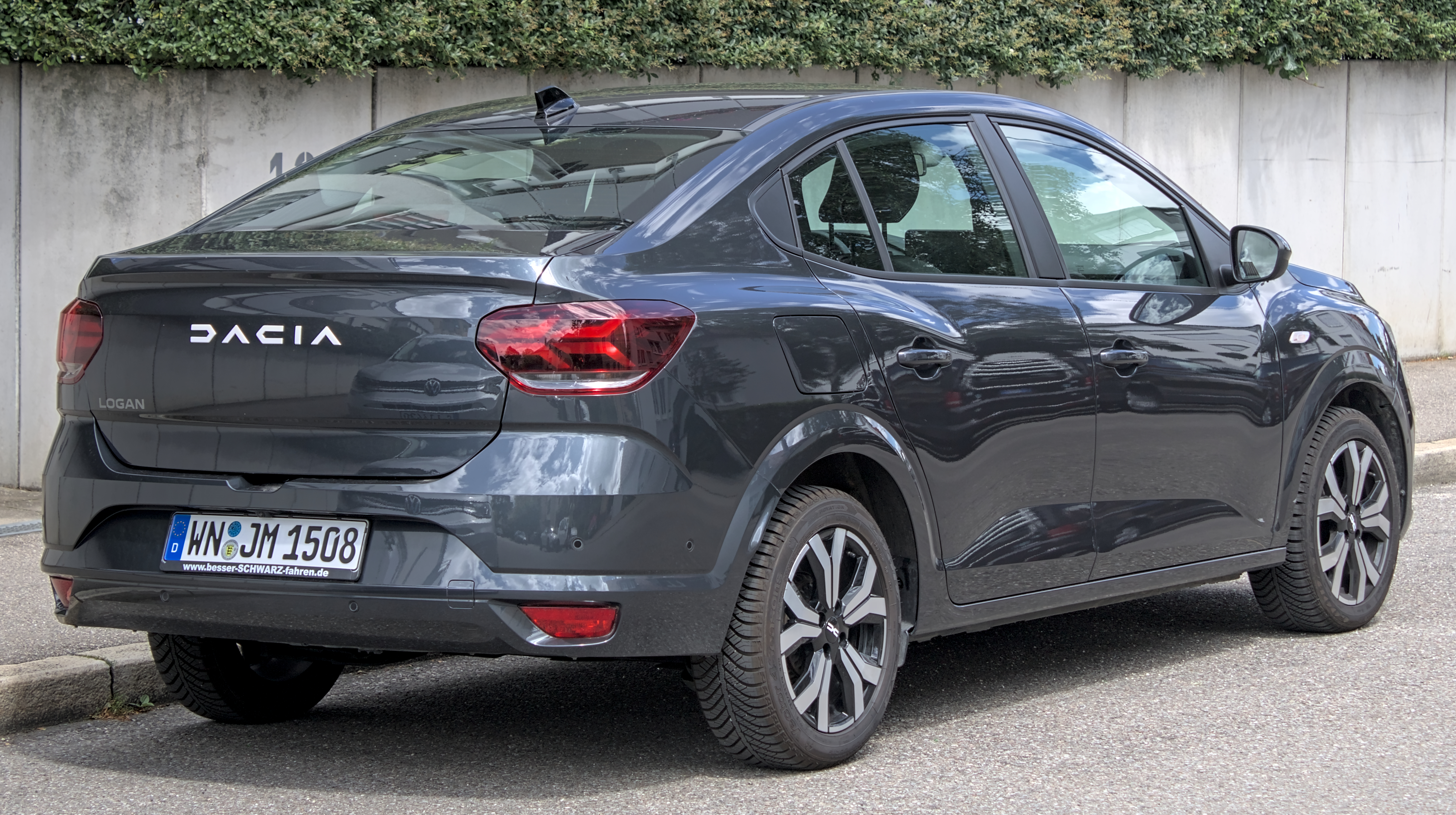
Facelift (rear view)

=== 2025 refresh ===
On 6 October 2025, the Logan alongside the Sandero, Sandero Stepway and Jogger, received a heavy facelift featuring a redesigned front fascia, new headlights, new fog lights and new alloys, while the rear remains the same as the previous facelift.

=== Renault Taliant (LJF) ===
The Renault Taliant is a rebadged third-generation Logan. It was revealed in Turkey on 11 March 2021, and went on sale on 24 May 2021. Built in Morocco, the vehicle is overall largely similar on the Logan, sharing the same bodywork with changes on the front fascia, rear fascia, and side door shoulder lines. As with the Logan, the Taliant is based on the CMF-B LS platform. It is sold on various markets, such as Turkey, but also Ukraine, Georgia, Middle-East and in some African countries.

The name "Taliant" is derived from the word "talent".

In 2025, the Taliant was removed from Renault's Turkish website. After 2025 refresh for model year 2026 Renault Taliant rebadged to Dacia Logan in Turkey.

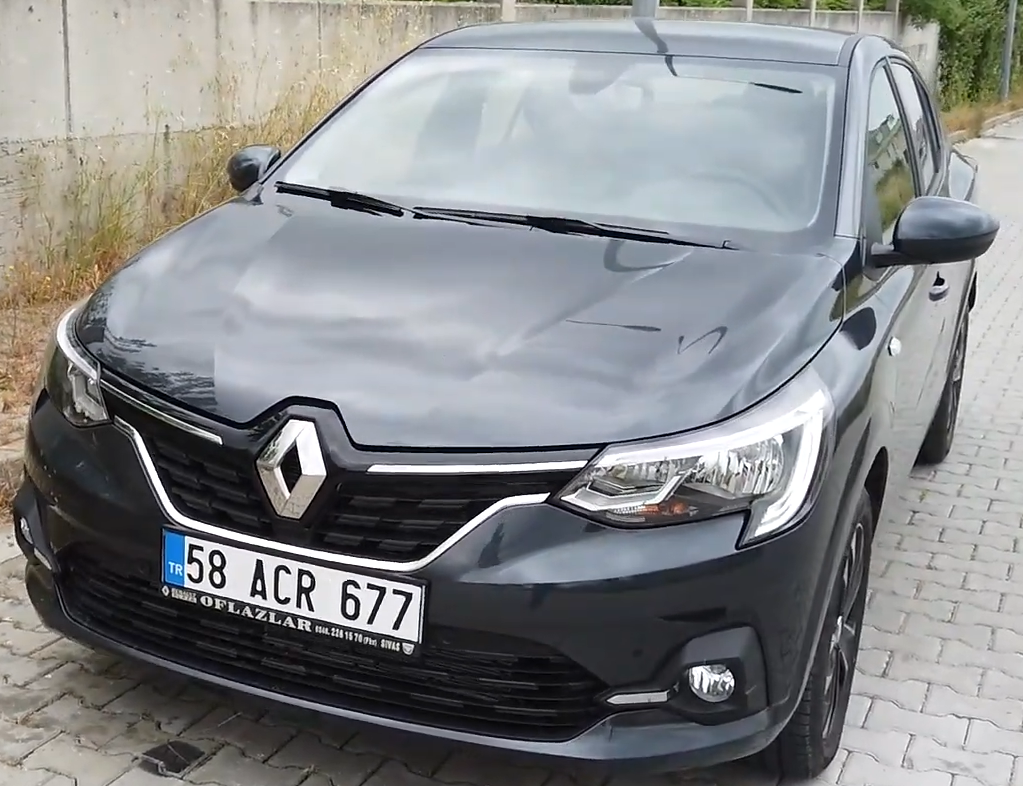
Renault Taliant (front)

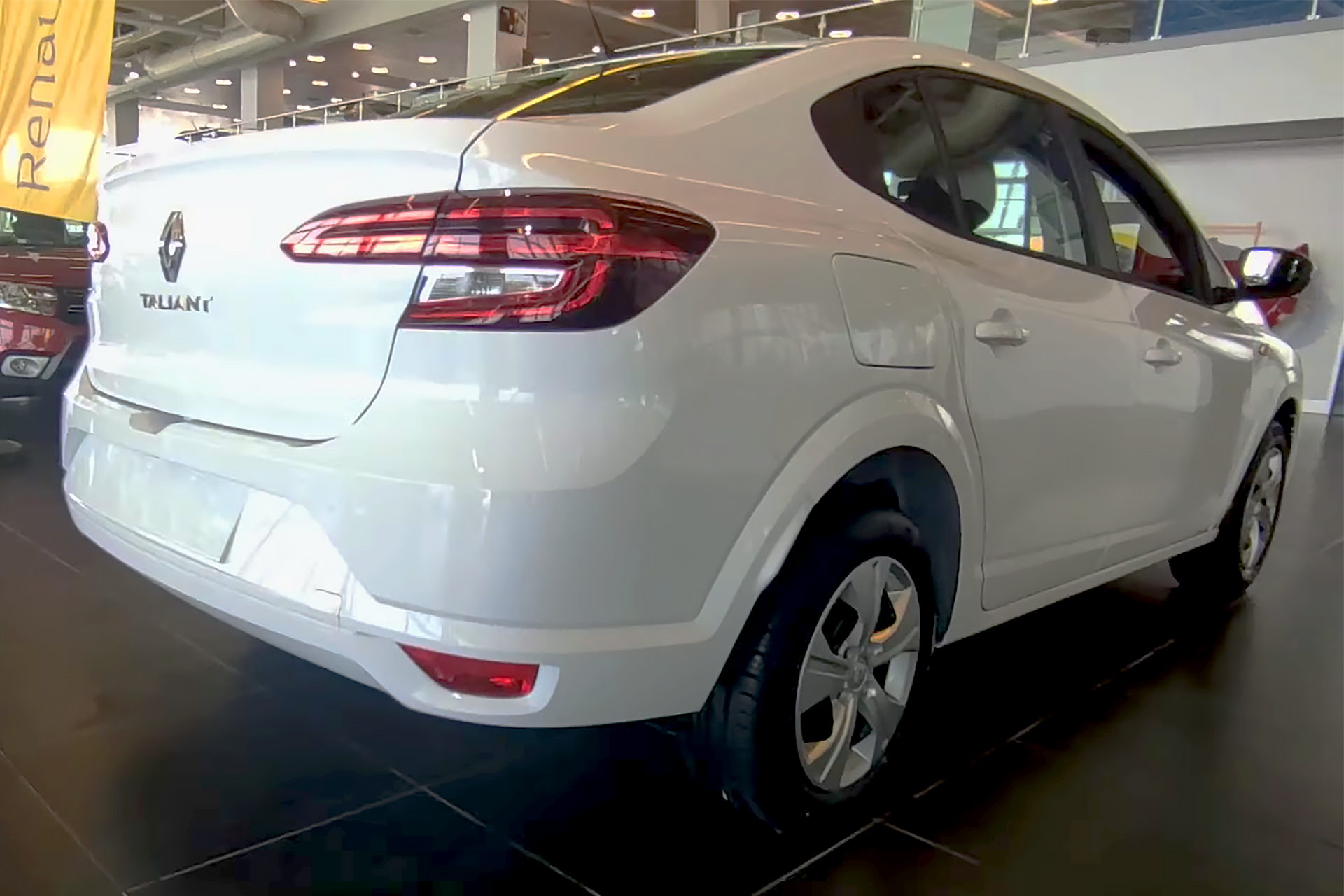
Renault Taliant (rear)

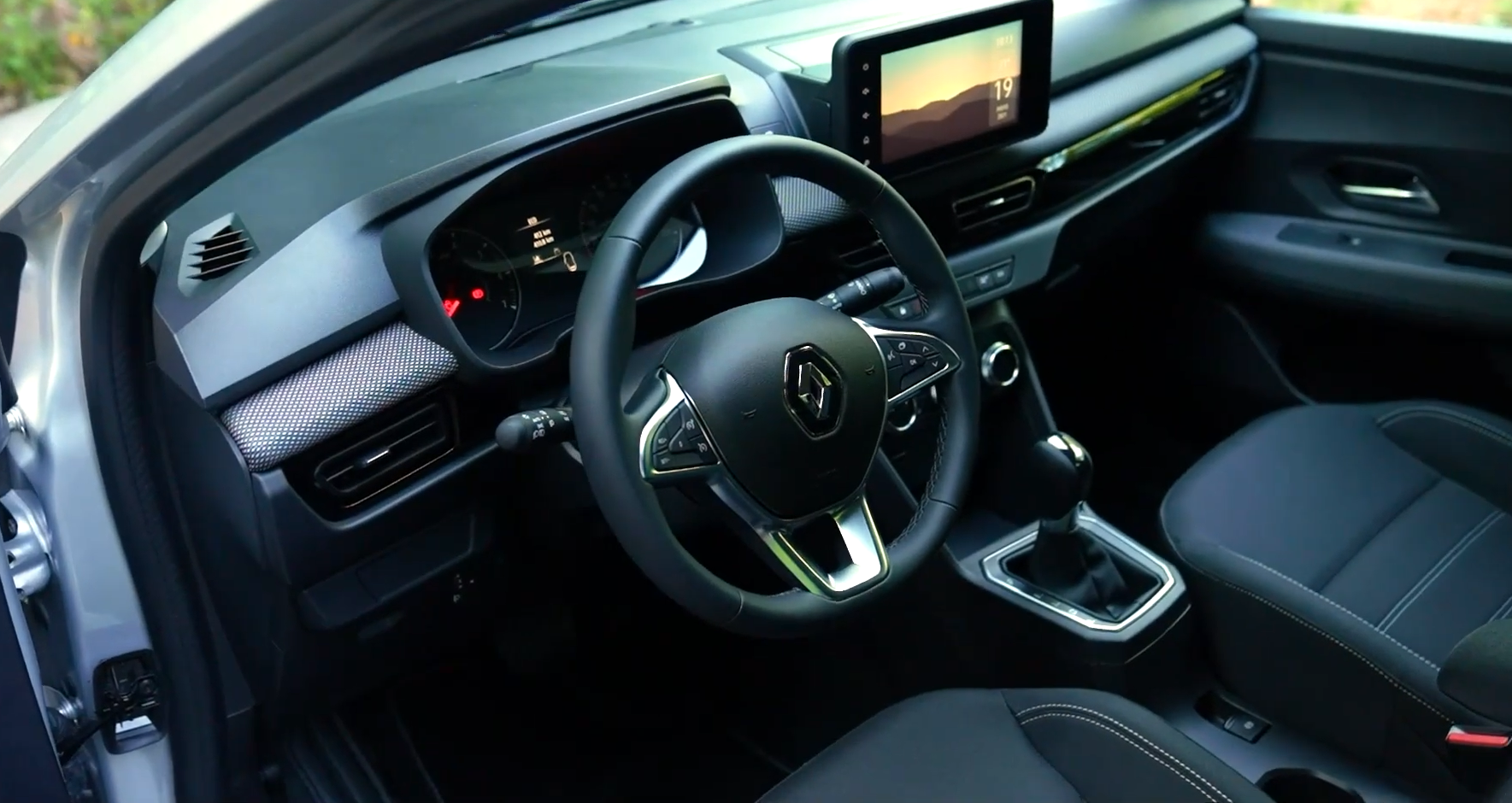
Interior

=== Markets ===
==== Dacia Logan ====
The third generation is available in fewer markets than its predecessor, at launch being offered only in Albania, Bosnia and Herzegovina, Kosovo, Moldova, Morocco, North Macedonia, Overseas French territories of the Pacific Ocean (French Polynesia and New Caledonia), Romania, Serbia and Tunisia.

In 2023, it was withdrawn from the Polish market due to "low customer interest". Also in 2023, the car was reintroduced to Israel after a five-year absence.

In 2024, at the request of dealers, a test batch of several hundred units was sent to Germany. In the same year, the model was brought back to Portugal.

==== Renault Taliant ====
Outside of Turkey, the Taliant is only offered in a very limited number of countries, located in Eastern Europe (such as Ukraine, Georgia), Middle-East (Egypt, Jordan) and Africa (Nigeria, Gabon).

==== Russia ====
The Logan, along with the Sandero, was supposed to launch in Russia in 2022, but this was never completed due to EU sanctions and the consequent sale of Renault Russia. However, some camouflaged prototypes were photographed at the former Renault factory in Moscow, now Moskvitch. A cross-sedan based on the Dacia Logan was also supposed to launch in Russia, with camouflaged prototypes even photographed. A leaked image of the final car has been found in the Dacia Jogger's owner's manual, as revealed by French forum Worldscoop. A subcompact sedan developed independently by AvtoVAZ on the same platform was presented in 2024 and badged as the Lada Iskra.

=== Safety ===
==== Euro NCAP ====
The Logan in its standard European market configuration received 2 stars from Euro NCAP in 2021 with shared results from the Sandero Stepway.

== Sales ==
Sales by year
Year	Dacia	Renault
2004	22,833	−
2005	135,184	9,915
2006	184,472	63,134
2007	230,294	136,742
2008	218,887	206,059
2009	160,120	150,603
2010	126,598	189,898
2011	95,365	253,698
2012	102,175	221,752
2013	69,355	188,185

== Awards ==
The Logan was voted official best car of the year Autobest 2005 by the members of the Autobest jury, coming from 15 countries: Bulgaria, Croatia, Czech Republic, Cyprus, Macedonia, Hungary, Poland, Romania, Russia, Serbia, Slovakia, Slovenia, Turkey, Ukraine and Malta. The members of the jury score 13 criteria like fuel consumption, versatility, roominess or design.

The Logan won the fifteenth Best Compact trophy awarded by Abioto, the Brazilian trade press organisation, by a panel of 67 of the country's most influential motoring journalists.

The Logan won the 'Melhor Carro do Ano 2013' trophy (Best car of the year 2013) awarded by Motor Press magazine, ahead of the Citroën C4L sedan.

On 9 December 2013, less than one month after it was presented to Brazilian journalists, the Renault Logan won the Top Car TV Award in the Best National Car up to 30,999 reais category, ahead of the VW Golf and VW Fox, Toyota Etios and Ford Fiesta. The prize, awarded by a panel of communications and marketing professionals from various automakers and news organisations, also considered the launch campaign.

== Concept cars and projects ==
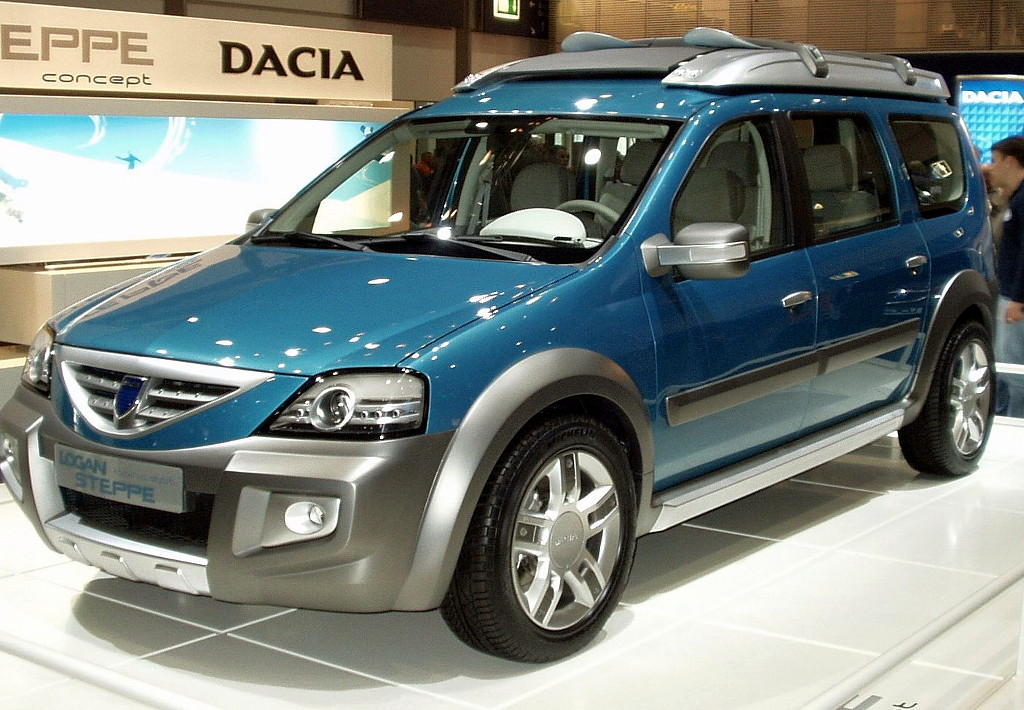
Dacia Logan Steppe

=== Logan Steppe ===
In 2006, a station wagon concept car, the Dacia Logan Steppe was presented at the Salon International de l'Auto in Geneva. The car was built by noted concept car builders DC Design in India as a forerunner of the Logan MCV.

=== Logan S2000 ===
The S2000 was a short lived project for a racing version of the Logan.

=== Dacia Cup ===
Since 2007, there is a dedicated class in the Romanian Rally Championship, called Cupa Dacia, for Group N prepared Logans. It is a class competed especially by rookies, in the beginning of their careers. The cars used are 1.6 MPI versions.

=== Motorsport ===
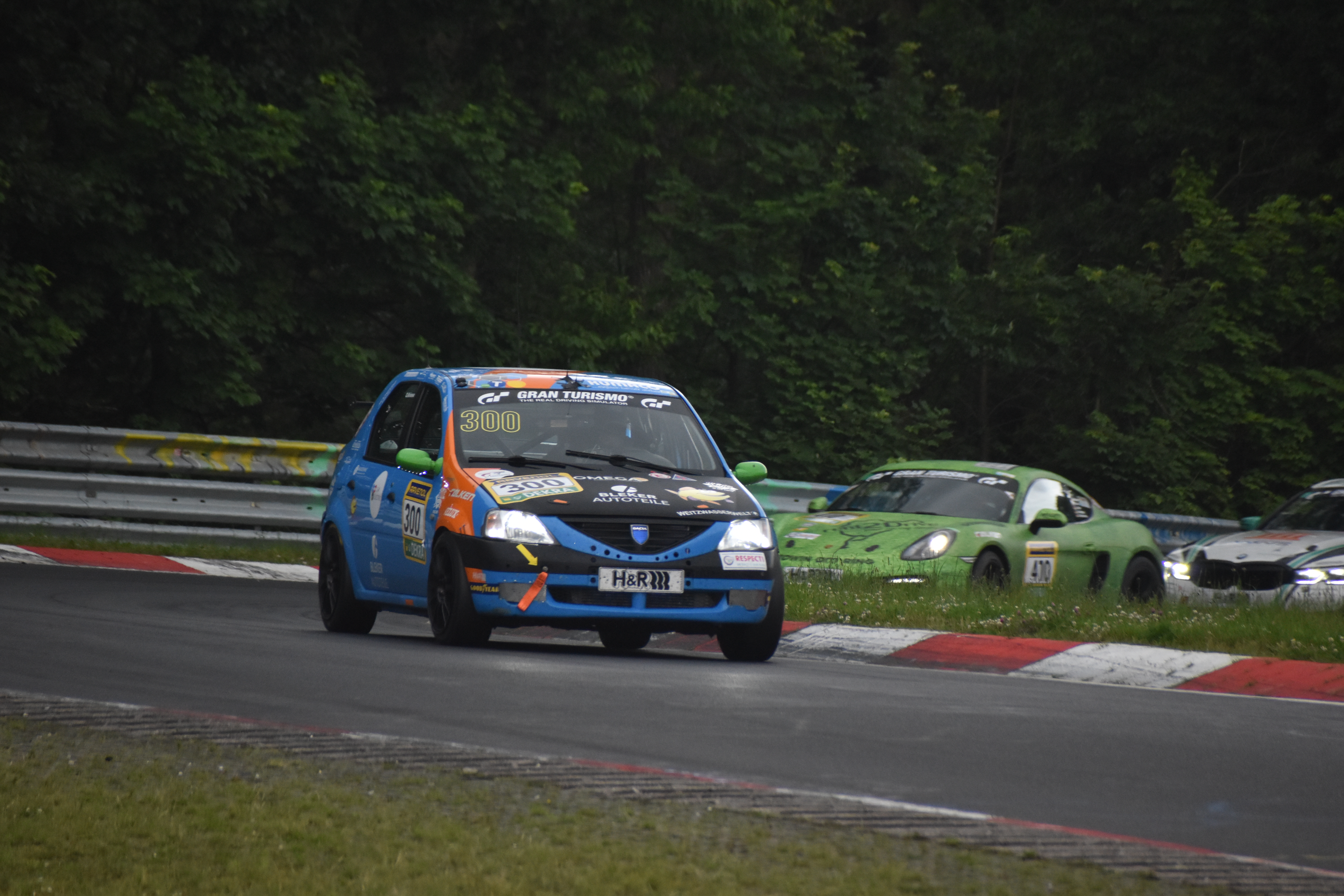
Dacia Logan of Ollis Garage Racing.

A first-generation Logan run by Ollis Garage Racing started competing in the Nürburgring Langstrecken-Serie, which solely competes on the Nürburgring Nordschleife, in 2021. The car gathered a following, similar to that of the Opel Manta 'Foxtail', as the slowest car around the Nordschleife. The original car was destroyed in the 2023 edition of the 24 Hours of Nürburgring in a collision with the Dinamic GT Porsche whilst competing in the SP3 class, but returned in 2024 with a new body and a turbocharged engine, now running in the SP3T class. The team has since continued to race the Logan in subsequent editions of the 24-hour event.
