= Renault Twingo =

City car manufactured by Renault (1992-2024)

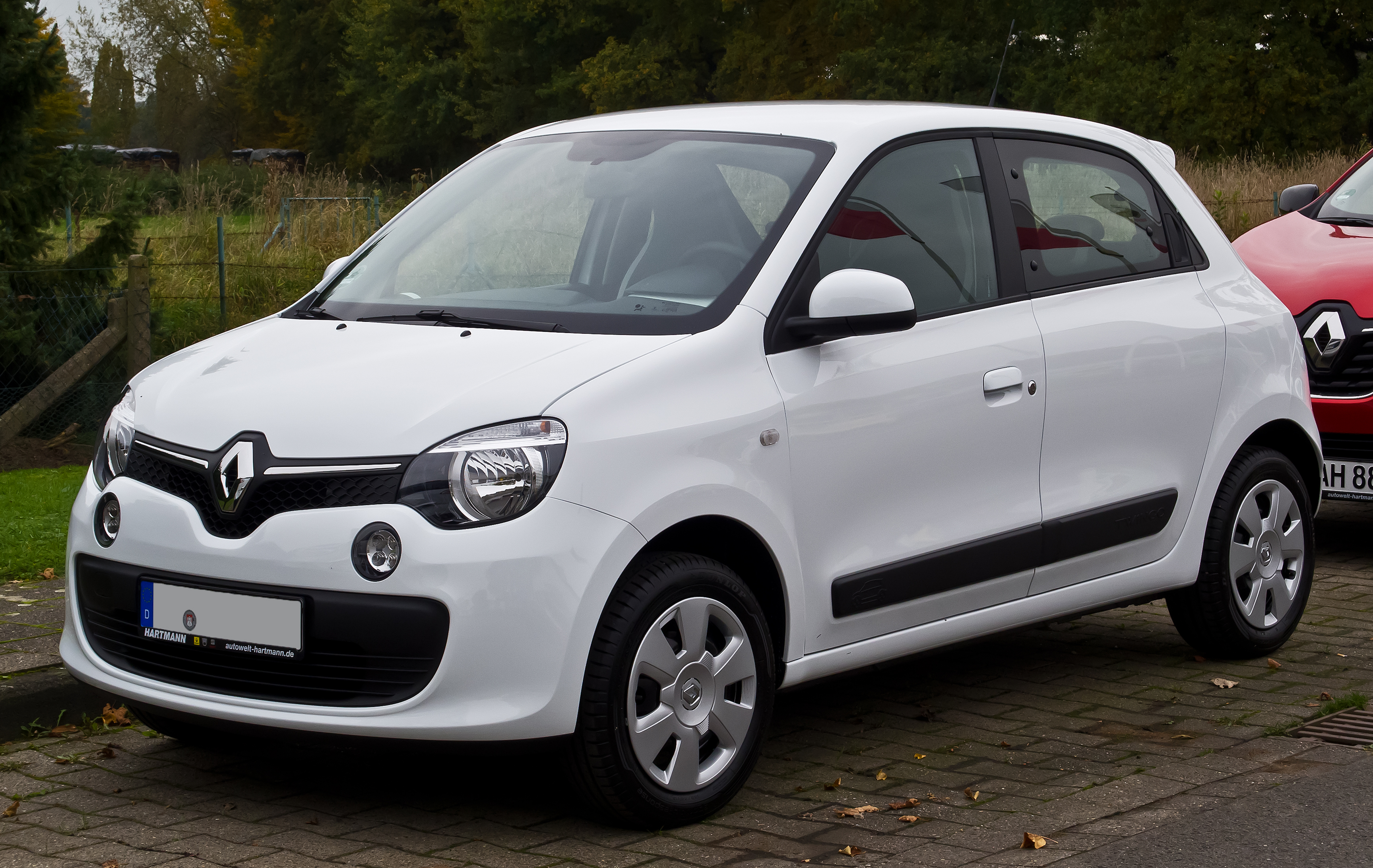
- Third generation Twingo

Overview
- Manufacturer: Renault
- Production: 1992–2024

Body and chassis
- Class: City car
- Body style: 3-door hatchback (Twingo I and II); 5-door hatchback (Twingo III and IV)
- Layout: Front-engine, front-wheel-drive (Twingo I, II and IV); Rear mid-engine, rear-wheel drive (Twingo III）

Chronology
- Predecessor: Renault 4 Renault 5
- Successor: Renault Twingo E-Tech

The Renault Twingo is a city car made by the French company Renault from 1992 to 2024 across three generations. The name is said to be a blend of twist, swing, and tango in some official Renault sources, but an official Renault press release has explicitly denied this derivation.

The first-generation Twingo (two door, front engine) debuted at the Paris Motor Show on 5 October 1992, receiving its formal market launch in continental European markets beginning in April 1993. Renault launched the second-generation Twingo (two door, front engine) in the summer of 2007; and the third-generation Twingo (four doors, rear engine) debuted at the 2014 Geneva Motor Show, receiving its formal market launch in September 2014. Production of the Twingo ended in the summer of 2024, when the car was replaced by the all-electric Renault Twingo E-Tech.

== First generation (1993) ==
Renault Twingo
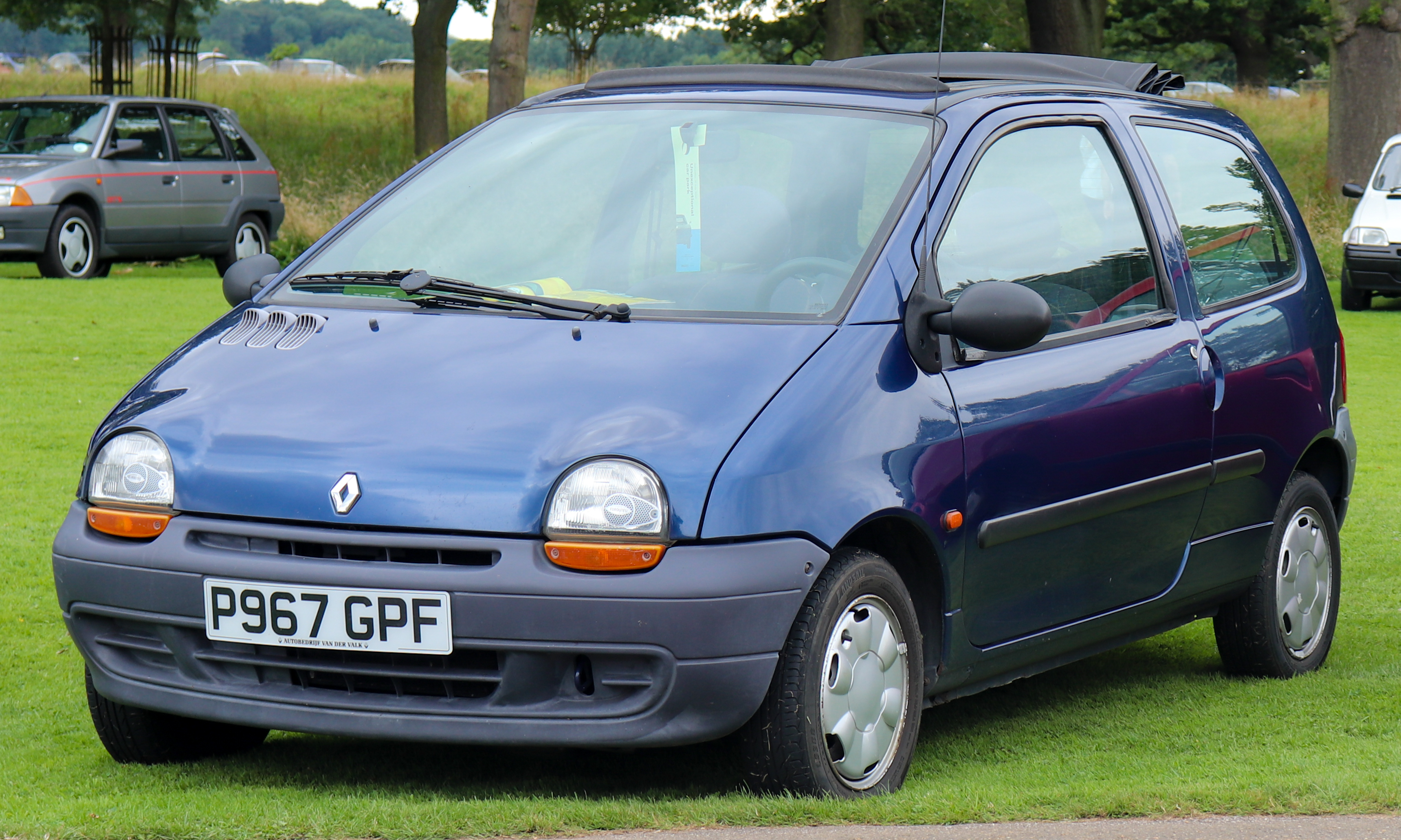

Overview
- Production: 1992–2007 (France); 1994–2003 (Spain); 1994–1999 (Taiwan); 1999–2002 (Uruguay); 1995–2012 (Colombia); 1994–2002 (Brazil)
- Assembly: France: Flins (Flins Plant); Uruguay: Montevideo (Nordex); Colombia: Envigado (Sofasa); Spain: Valladolid (Renault Spain); Taiwan: Changhua (Sanfu Motors)
- Designer: Jean-Pierre Ploué; Patrick Le Quément

Body and chassis
- Body style: 3-door hatchback
- Layout: Front-engine, front-wheel-drive

Powertrain
- Engine: petrol: 999 cc D7D I4; 1149 cc D7F I4; 1149 cc D4F 16V I4; 1239 cc C3G I4
- Transmission: 5-speed manual 5-speed automated manual 3-speed automatic

Dimensions
- Wheelbase: 2,345 mm (92.3 in)
- Length: 3,430 mm (135.0 in)
- Width: 1,630 mm (64.2 in)
- Height: 1,420 mm (55.9 in)
- Curb weight: from 790 kg (1,742 lb)

The original Twingo was launched in April 1993, was sold in European LHD markets until August 2007, and received intermediate restylings in 1998, 2000, and 2004. It was notably similar to the original Honda Today in design, including the overall shape and the headlamps partially set into the front bumper.

=== Development ===
Designed under the direction of Patrick Le Quément, Renault's chief designer, the car derived a concept developed through the W60 project when Gaston Juchet was Renault's chief designer. The project was aimed at replacing the Renault 4 with a minivan model.

Le Quément chose a Jean-Pierre Ploué design to develop the production version. Le Quément stretched the original prototype and added an unconventional front-end layout resembling a "smile". The interior equipment was mounted on a central console to free space. Renault had participated in the 1981 to 1984 'Mono-Box' ECO 2000 car project, along with PSA Peugeot Citroën and the French Government.

The Twingo I's electronic, centrally mounted instrument panel had a speedometer, fuel gauge, clock, odometer, and trip recorder controlled via a stalk-located button. A strip of warning lights was located behind the steering wheel. The rear seat featured a sliding mechanism to enable either increased boot space or more rear-seat legroom. The boot parcel shelf was attached to the inside of the tailgate, and lifted with the tailgate – or could clip back against the rear window when not required.

Manufactured at the Flins Renault Factory from the time of its launch until 28 June 2007, the Twingo I was also manufactured in Taiwan, Spain, Colombia, and Uruguay from 1999 to 2002, remaining in production until 8 June 2012 in Colombia, by the Sofasa conglomerate, strictly for the domestic market.

Twingo I Safety

Euro NCAP results:

- Adult occupant:, score 23
- Pedestrian:, score 11

=== Timeline ===
April 1993: the Twingo launched with only one trim level, and four exterior colours: coral red, Indian yellow, coriander green, and ultramarine blue. The car retailed at a price of 55,000FF (approximately €8,400). In June 1994, new exterior colours were introduced along with minor interior changes, as well as optional electric windows and mirrors, and locks with remote keyless entry. Also, it only had one engine (from the Renault 5): a 1239 cc OHC 4-cylinder producing 60 hp (44 kW) at 5300 rpm. Four months later, the Twingo Easy model was launched, with an automated clutch on the manual gearbox.

September 1995: the first of many special Twingo editions launched, while inbuilt airbags become optional. In July 1996, a new 1149 cc engine (from the Clio) with 58 hp (43 kW) at 5250 rpm was fitted to replace the previous engine. Alongside the new engine came the Twingo Matic model, equipped with a three-speed automatic gearbox. Also, various improvements were made, including the addition of a third brake light.

1997: the Twingo received a restyling of the interior and dashboard. The front and rear lights were alsorevised, and front orange indicator lights were merged into the headlamp housings. The front of the car is reinforced for added safety in a frontal impact. Two months later, the top-of-the-range Twingo Initiale model launched.

September 2000: the Twingo received a restyling, with larger, 14-inch wheels, revised door trims with larger door pockets, a black trunk opener lever (instead of shiny metal), and cup holders in front of the gearstick.

December 2000: a new 1.2-litre single overhead camshaft, 16-valve version of the D-series engine added to the range, with 75 hp (55 kW) at 5500 rpm. In April 2001, a new automated manual gearbox was launched, called Quickshift. Additional revisions followed in September 2002, including new interior trims and wheel covers.

In Japan, Renault was formerly licensed by Yanase Co., Ltd., and in 1999, Renault purchased a stake in Japanese automaker Nissan after Nissan had faced financial troubles following the collapse of the Japanese asset price bubble in 1991 and subsequent lost decade. As a result of Renault's purchase of interest, Yanase cancelled its licensing contract with Renault in the spring of 2000, and Nissan Motor Co., Ltd took over as the sole licensee, hence sales of the Twingo I in Japan were transferred from Yanase Store locations to Nissan Red Stage Store locations. Despite Japan being a right-hand drive market, the first generation was sold exclusively as left-hand drive, with the only change being the headlights.

September 2004: the third Twingo revision included a Renault emblem fitted to the boot lid, side rubbing strips, and a new range of exterior colours.

28 June 2007: Twingo I production ended in France, when the car was replaced by the Twingo II. By 30 June 2007, Twingo I production reached 2,478,648.

8 June 2012: end date of Twingo I production in Colombia.

In total, 2.6 million units of the first-generation Twingo were manufactured.

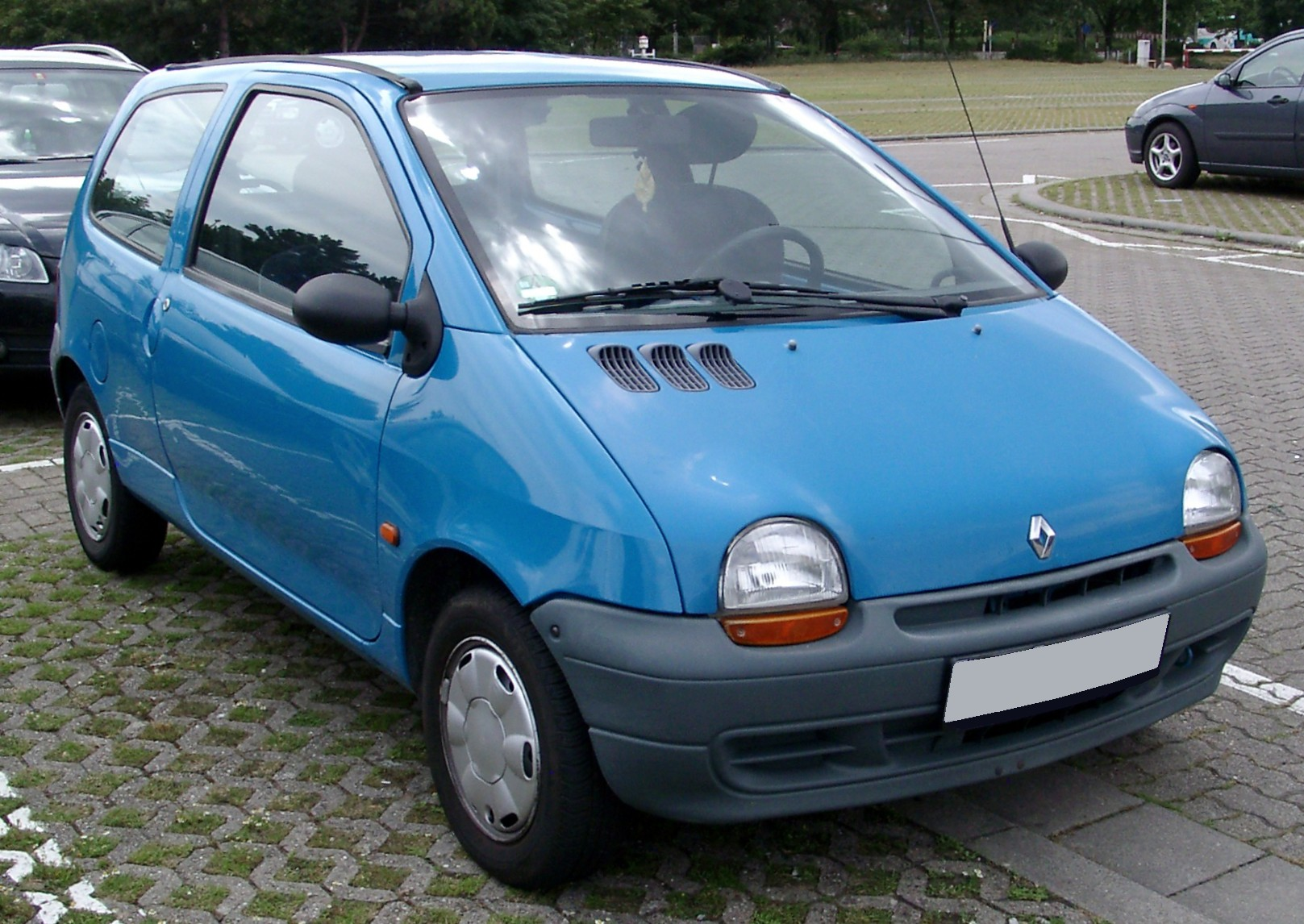
1993–1998 Twingo, front

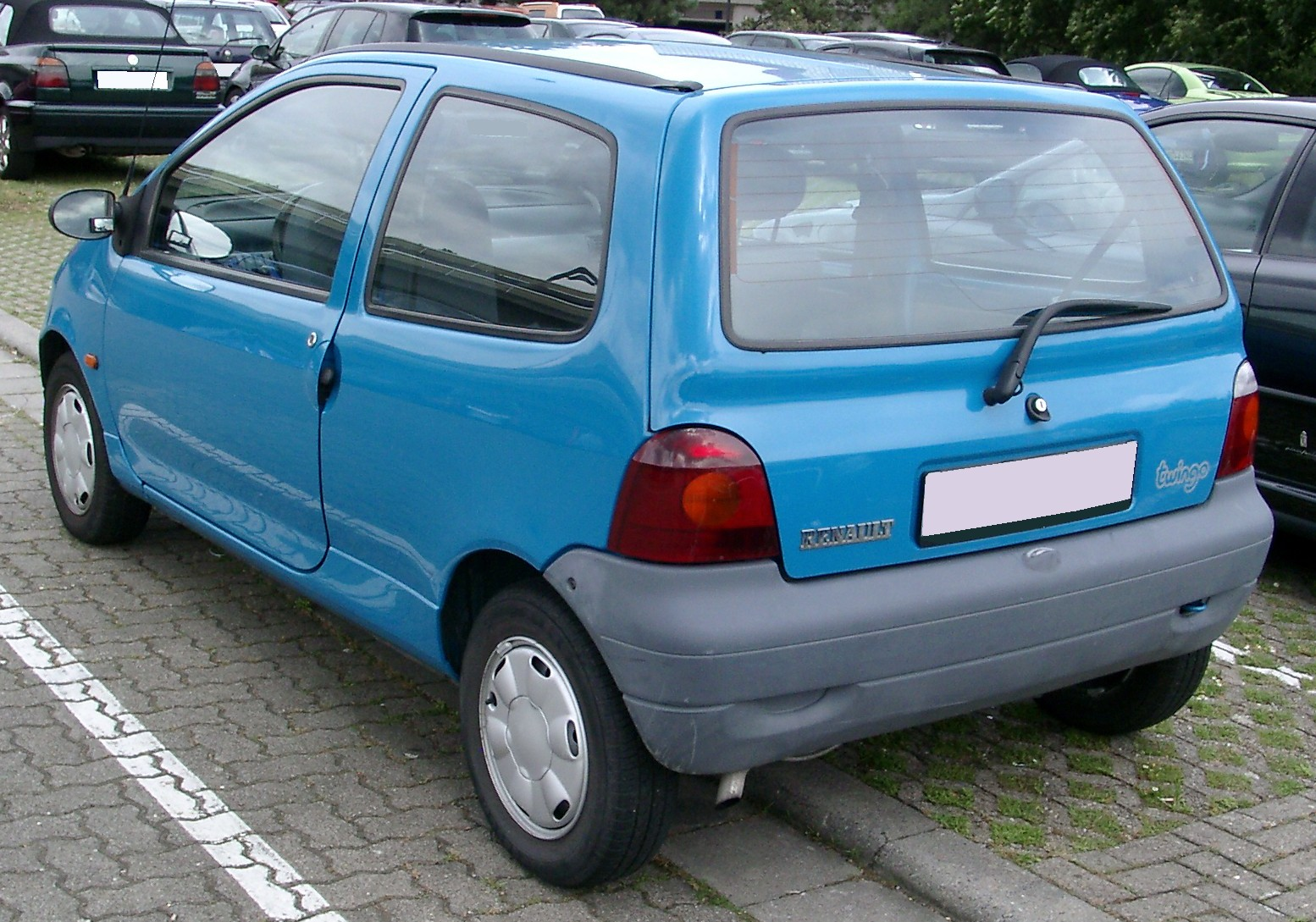
1993–1998 Twingo, rear

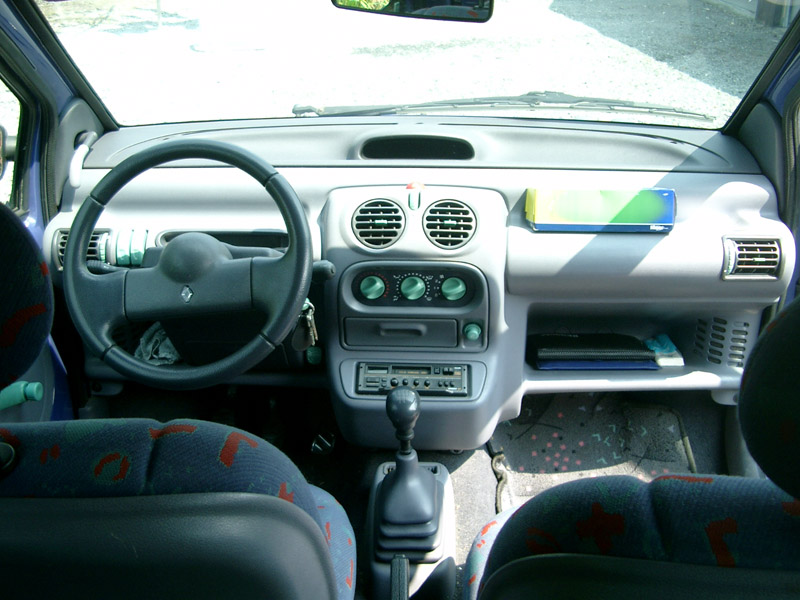
1993–1998 Twingo, interior

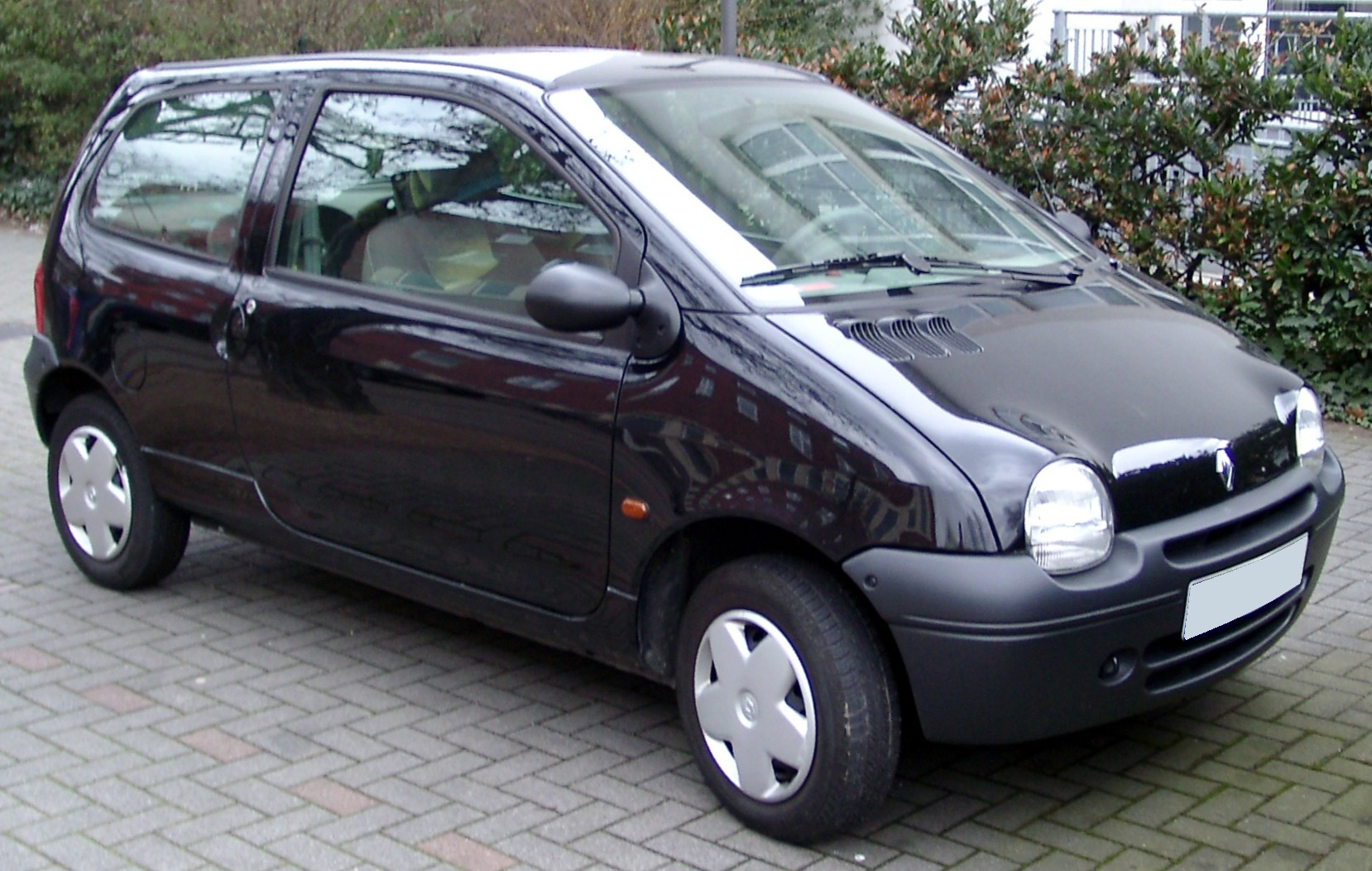
1998–2000 Twingo, front

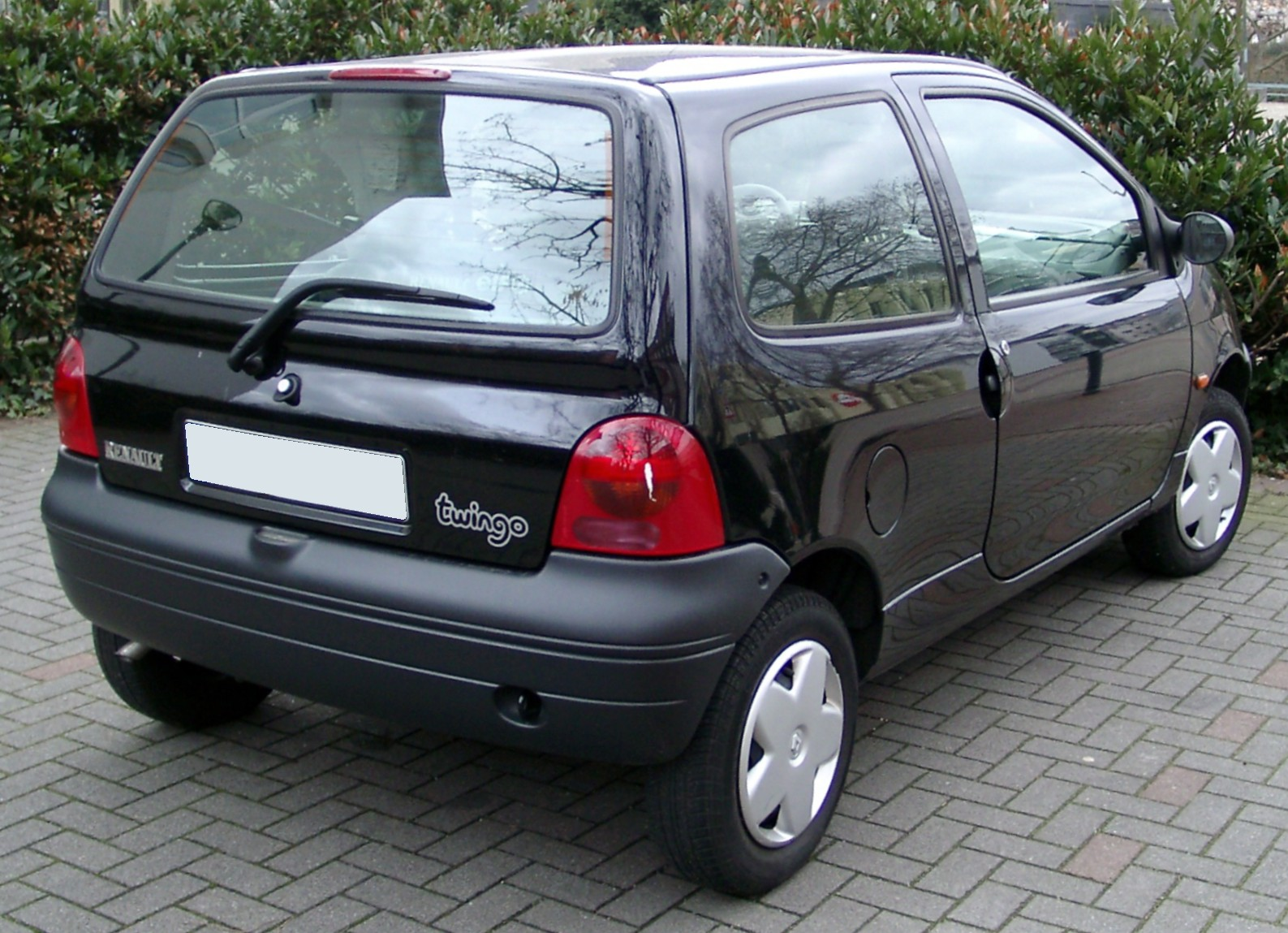
1998–2000 Twingo, rear

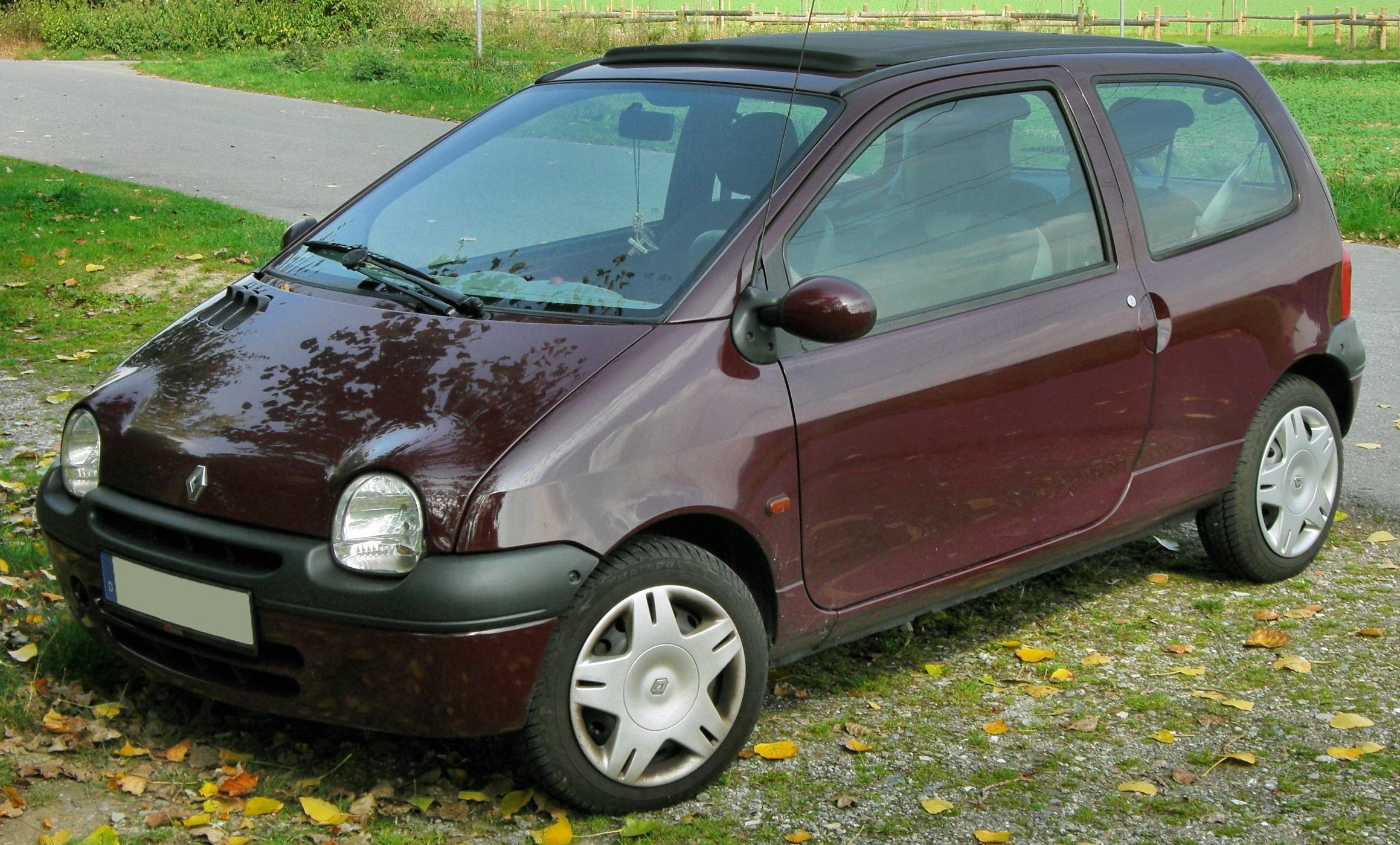
2000–2004 Twingo, front

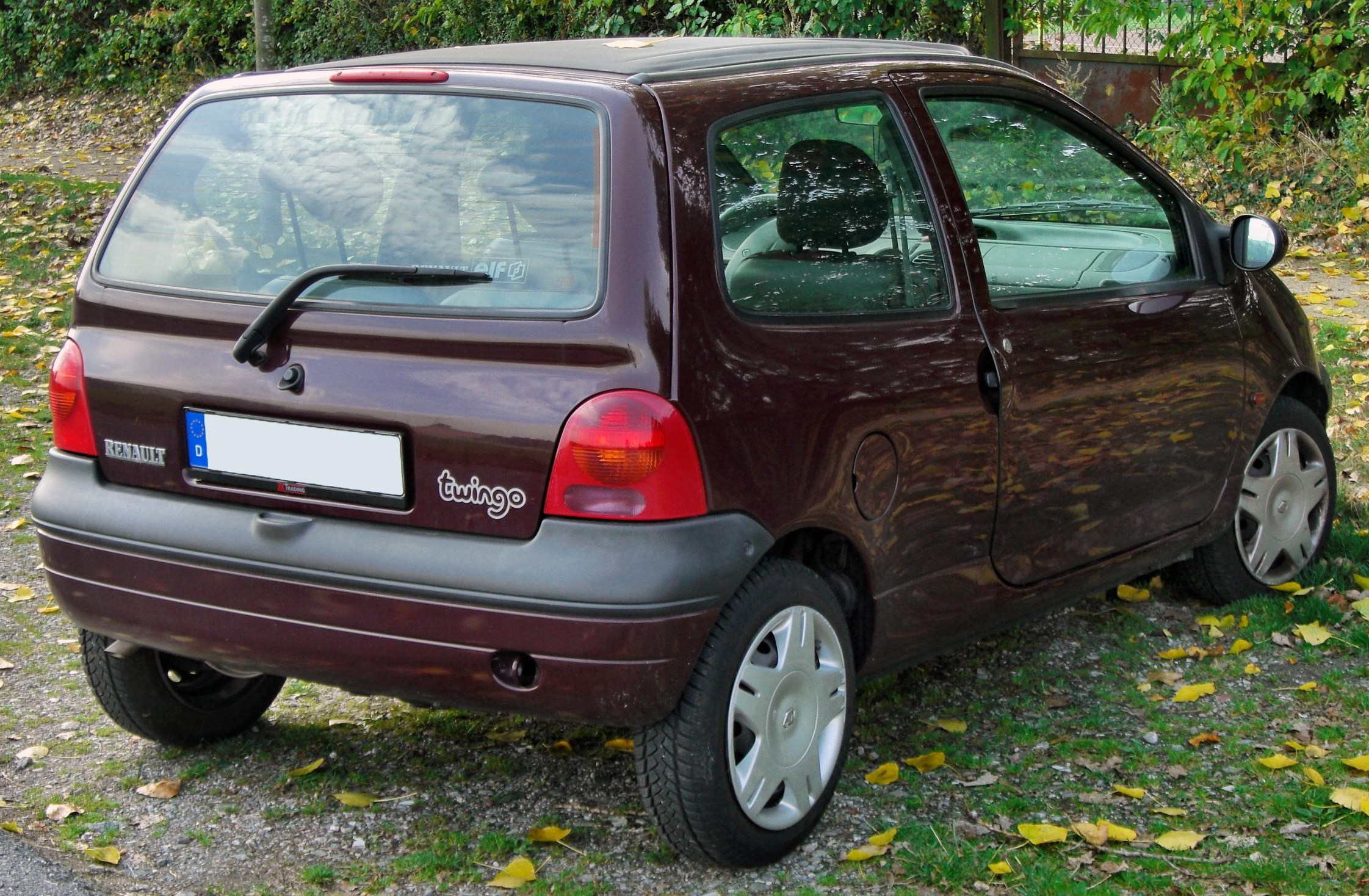
2000–2004 Twingo, rear

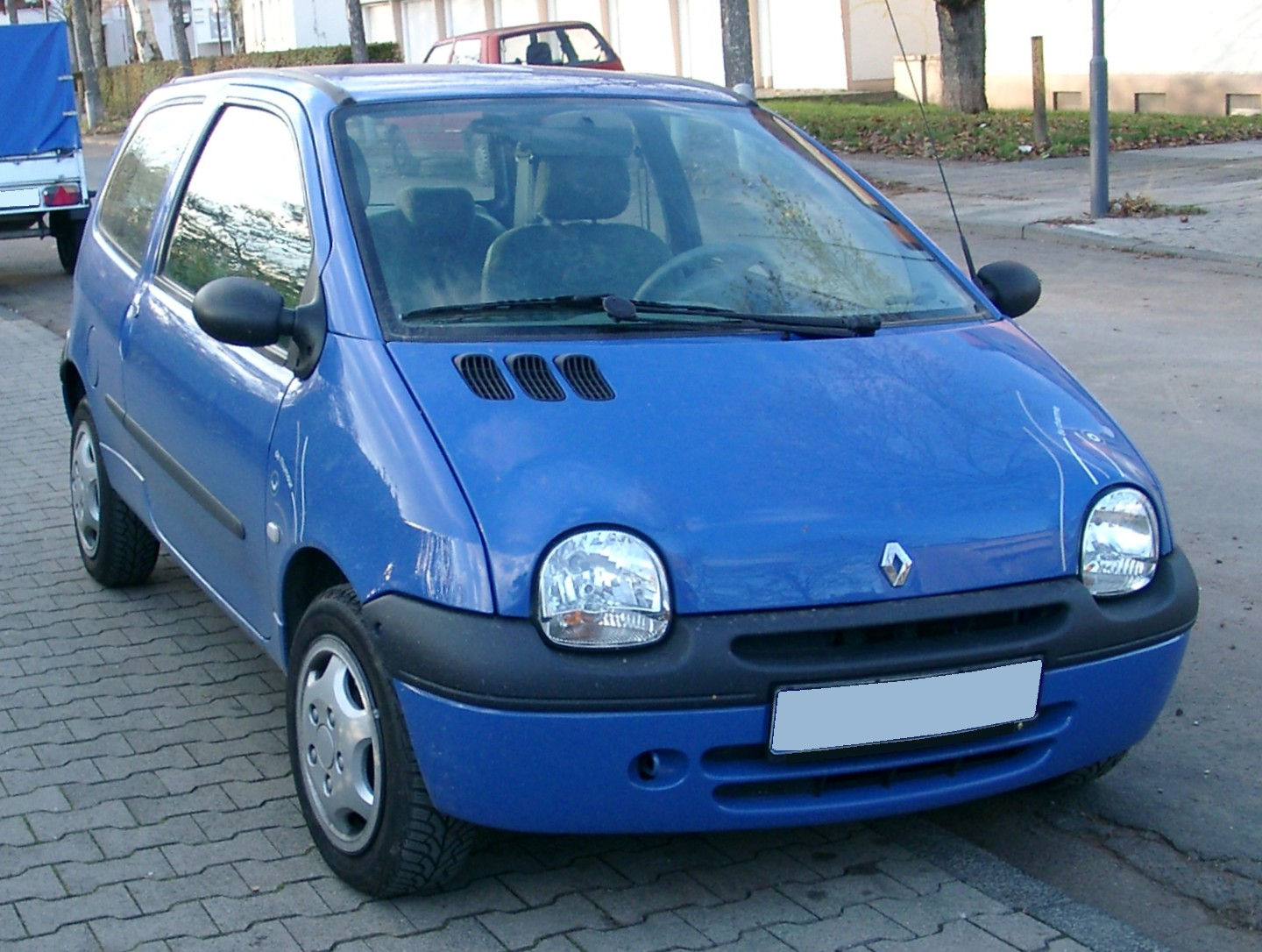
2004–2012 Twingo, front (non-standard wheels)

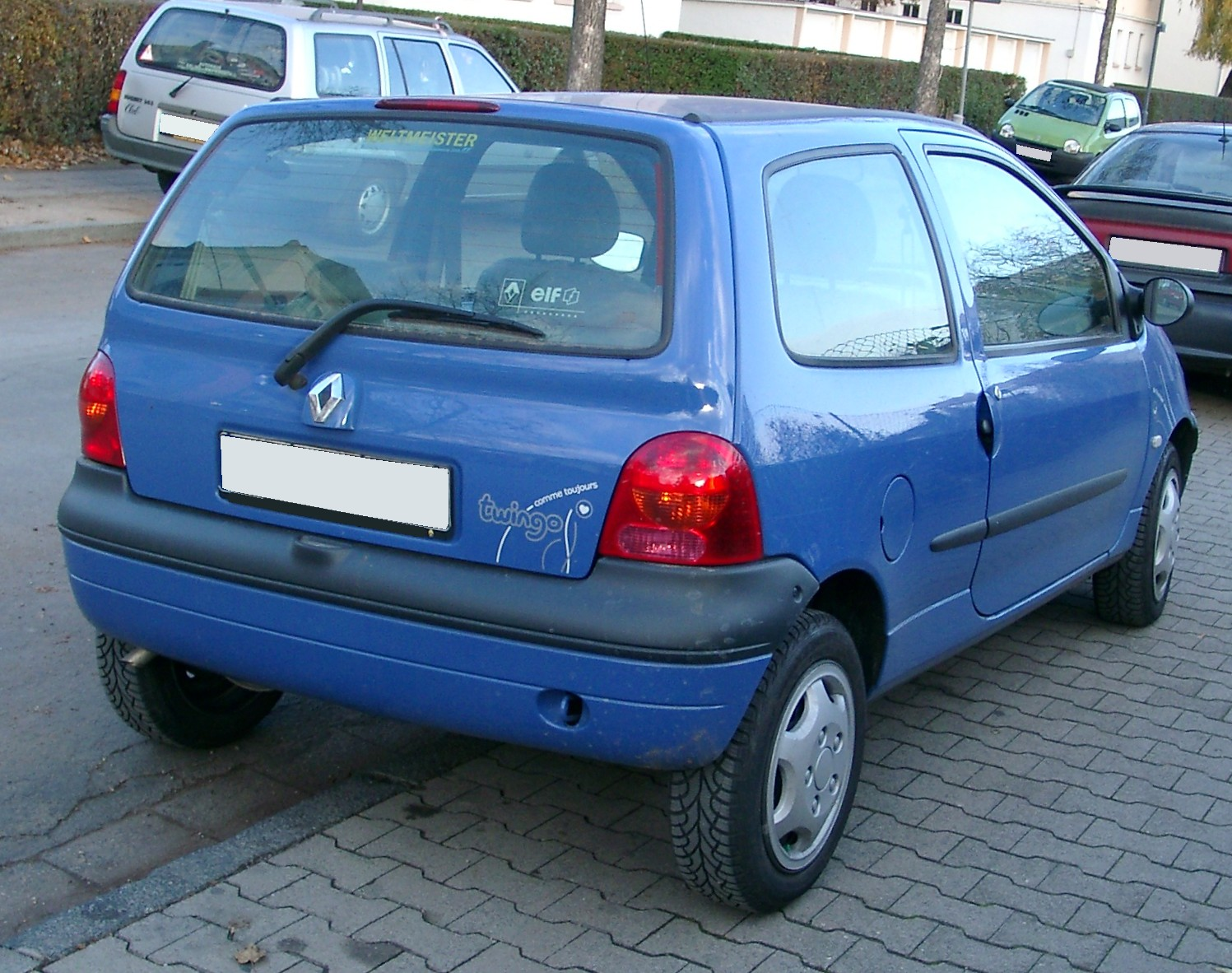
2004–2012 Twingo, rear (non-standard wheels)

=== Special models ===
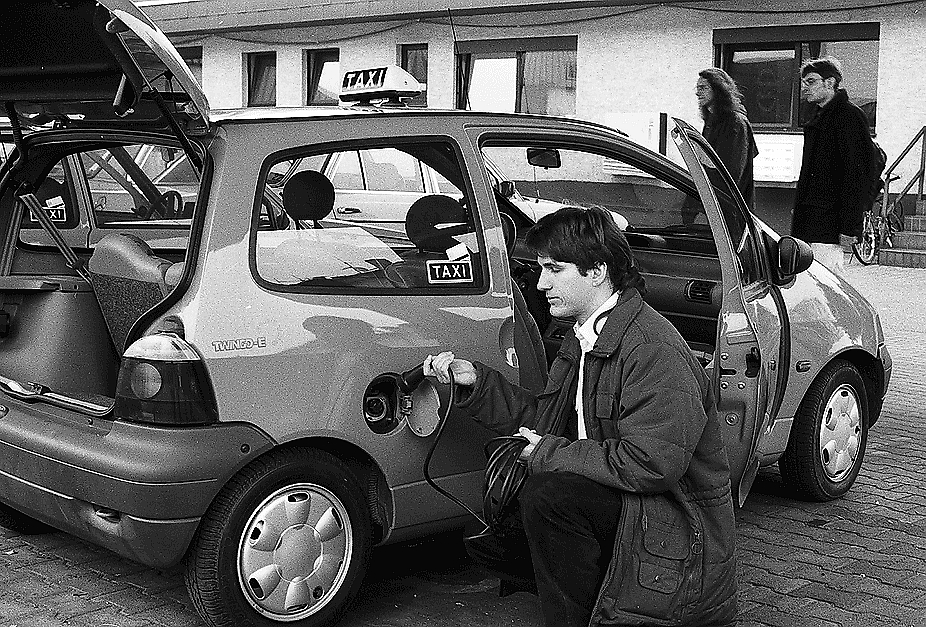
"Twingo-E" electric taxi in Freiburg, Germany, 1994

==== Limited edition ====
The first generation Twingo had a number of limited editions, including co-brandings with premium brands such as Perrier, Benetton, L'Oréal, Kenzo, Elite Model Management, and artistic references including Metropolis, Grease and Tintin.

==== Twingo Lecoq ====
The Renault Twingo Lecoq was a special edition produced in less than 50 units. It was an independent initiative of Carrosserie Lecoq.

==== Electric ====
A French company based in Normandy, Lormauto, presented at the 2022 Paris Motor Show and again in 2024 Paris Motor Show a rétrofit kit to transform the Renault Twingo 1 into a fully electric car. This approved model is now available from car rental company UCAR.

=== Motorsport ===
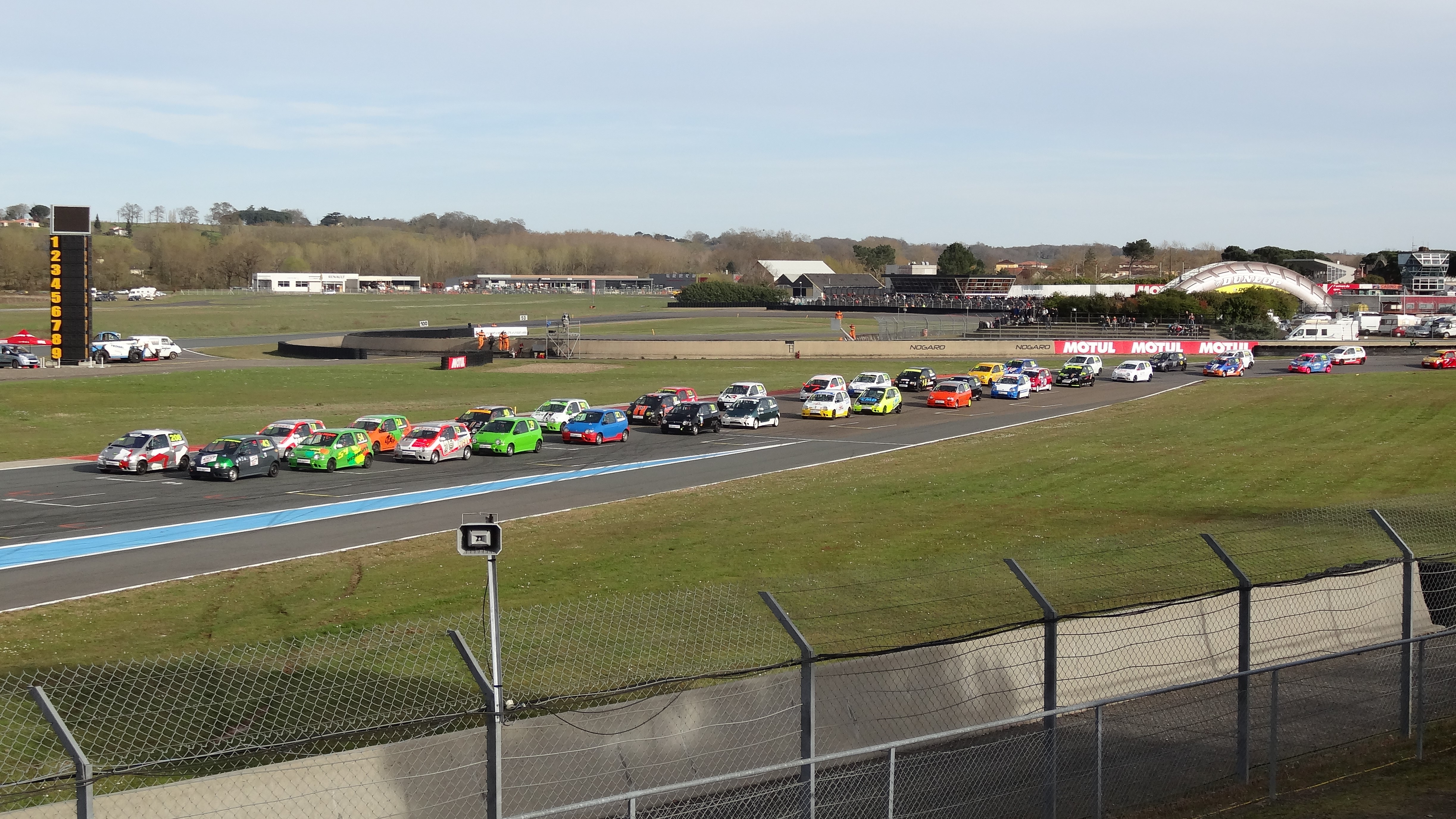
The Twin'Cup during the 2018 Easter Cups at Nogaro.

Since 2011, a one-make motor racing series for first generation Renault Twingos, called the Renault Twin Cup, has taken place in France.

== Second generation (2007) ==
Twingo II
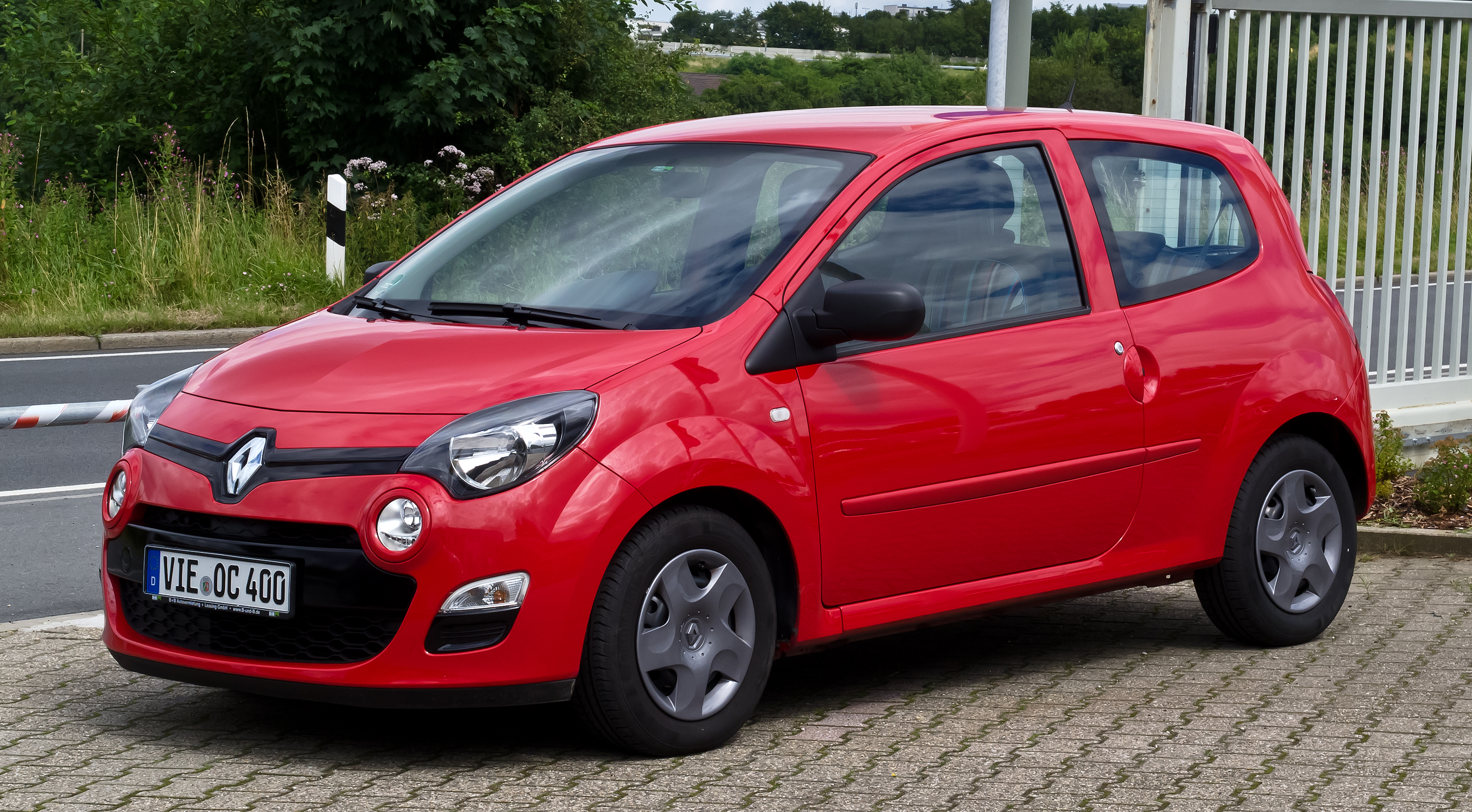

Overview
- Production: 2007–2014
- Assembly: France: Flins (Flins Plant); Slovenia: Novo Mesto (Renault Slovenia)

Body and chassis
- Body style: 3-door hatchback
- Layout: Front-engine, front-wheel-drive
- Platform: Clio II
- Related: Renault Wind

Powertrain
- Engine: petrol: 1.2 L D7F I4; 1.2 L D4F I4; 1.2 L D4FT turbo I4; 1.6 L K4M-RS I4; diesel: 1.5 L K9K I4
- Transmission: 5-speed manual 5-speed automatic

Dimensions
- Wheelbase: 2,365 mm (93.1 in)
- Length: 3,600 mm (141.7 in)
- Width: 1,655 mm (65.2 in); RS: 1,688 mm (66.5 in)
- Height: 1,470 mm (57.9 in)
- Curb weight: from 1,000 kg (2,205 lb)

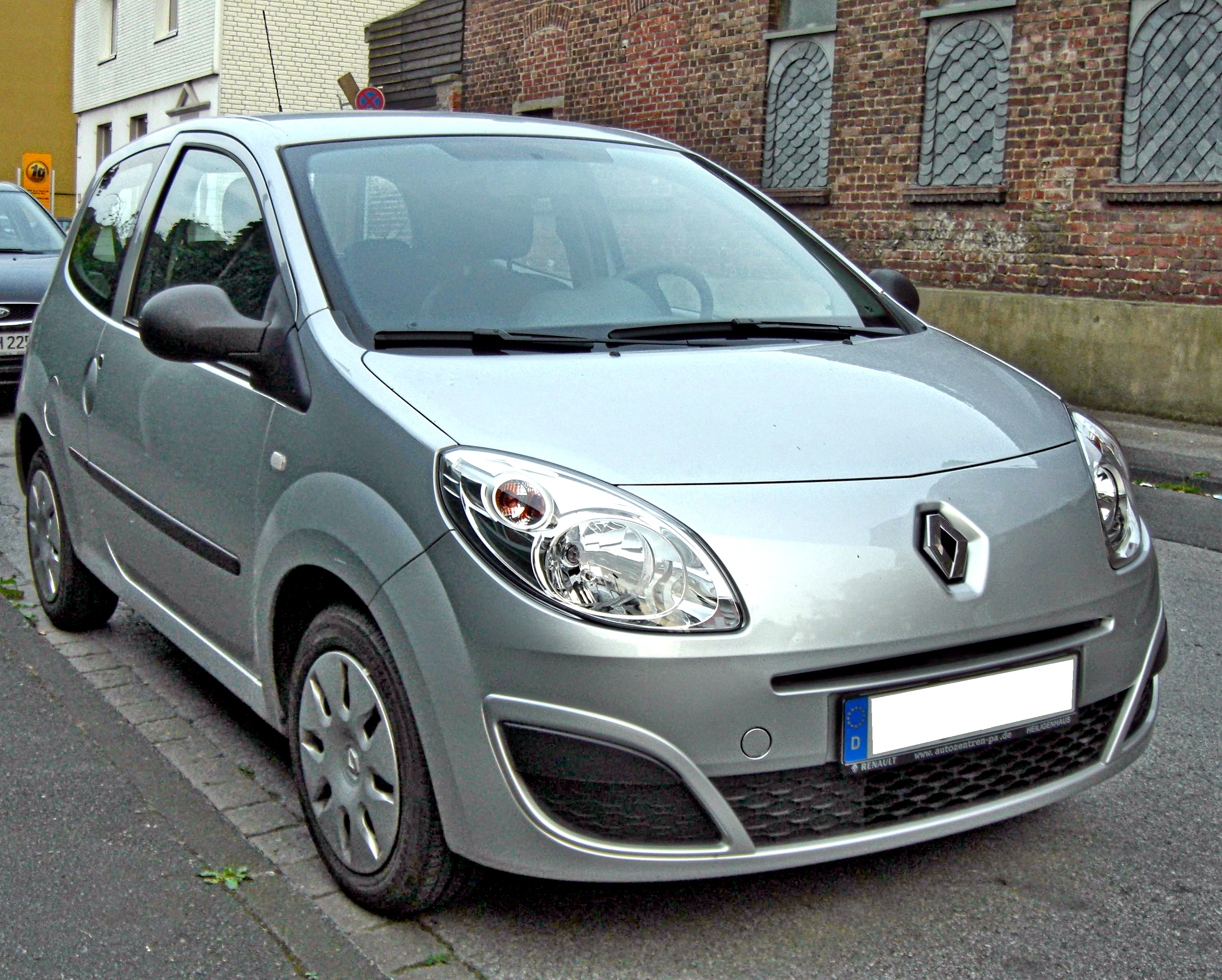
Renault Twingo II, phase one

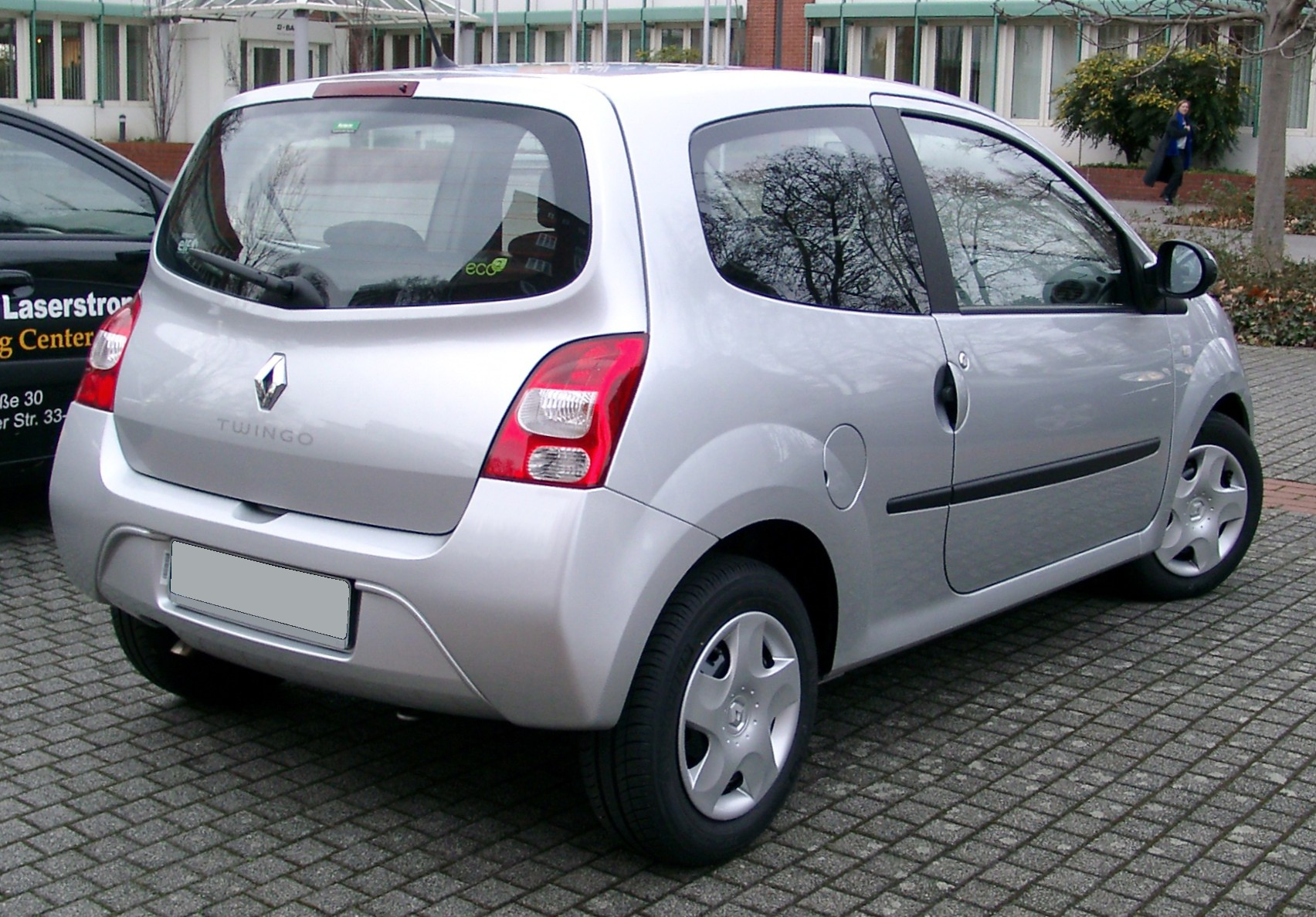
Rear of the Twingo II phase one

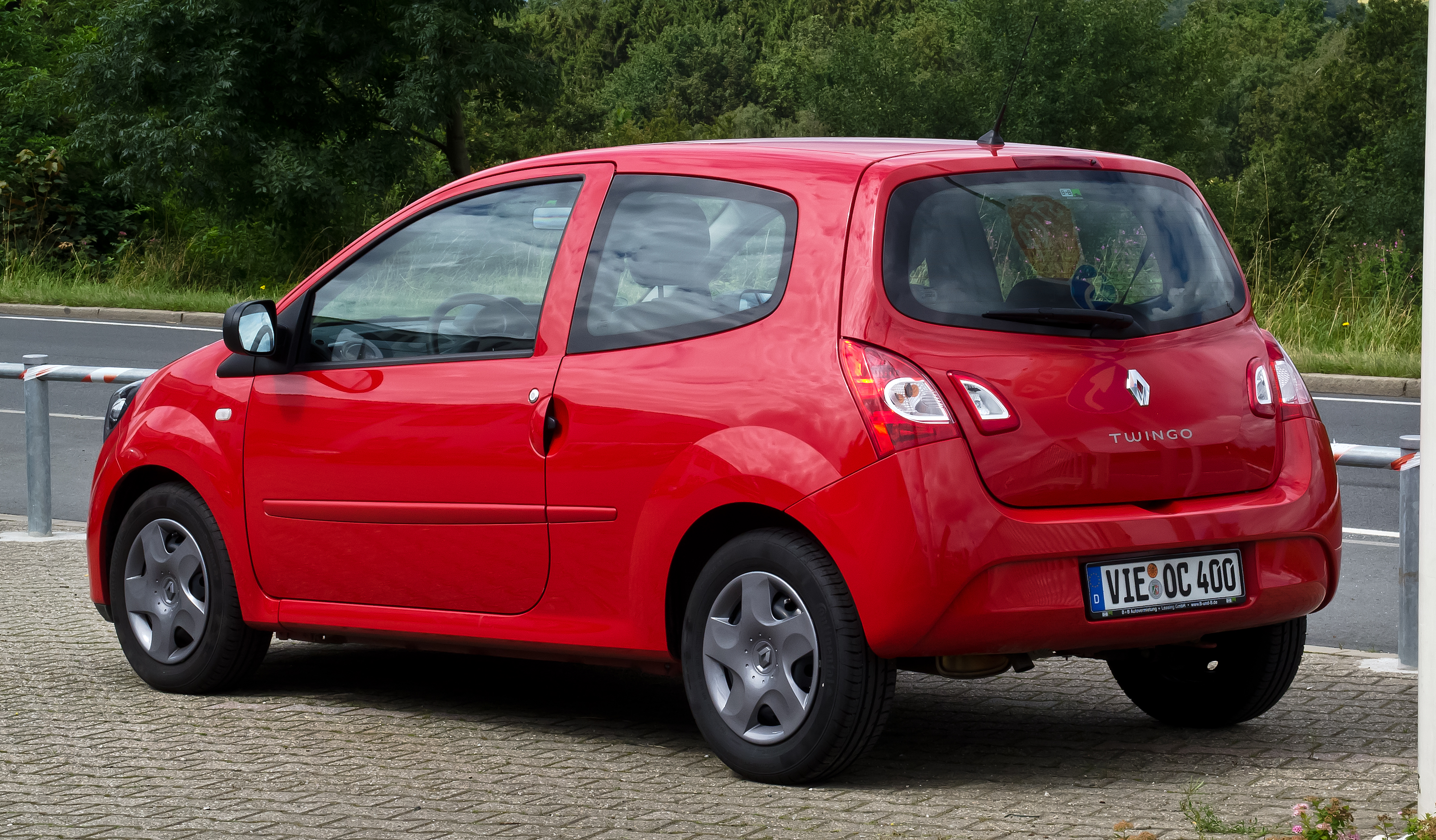
Rear of the Twingo II, phase two

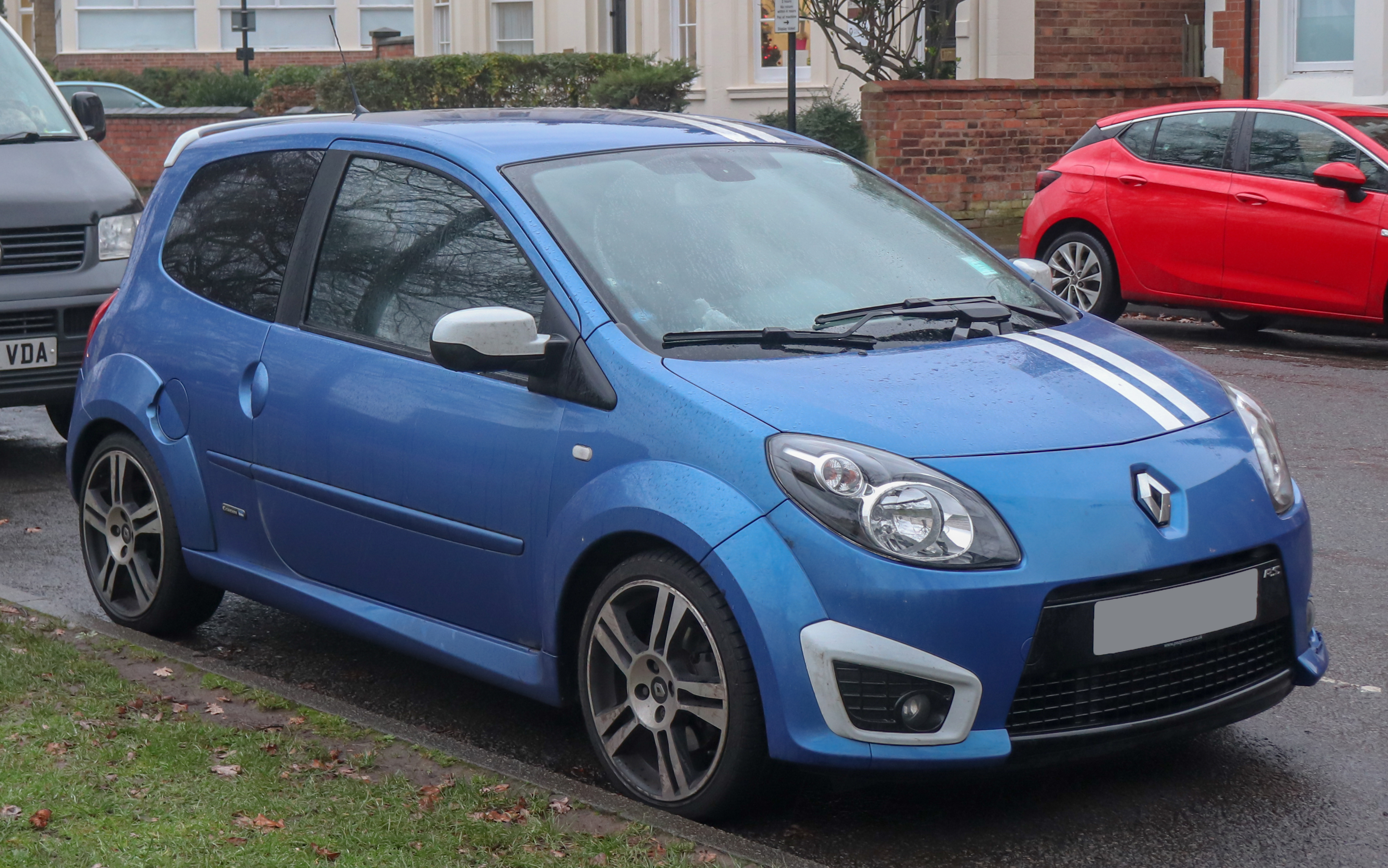

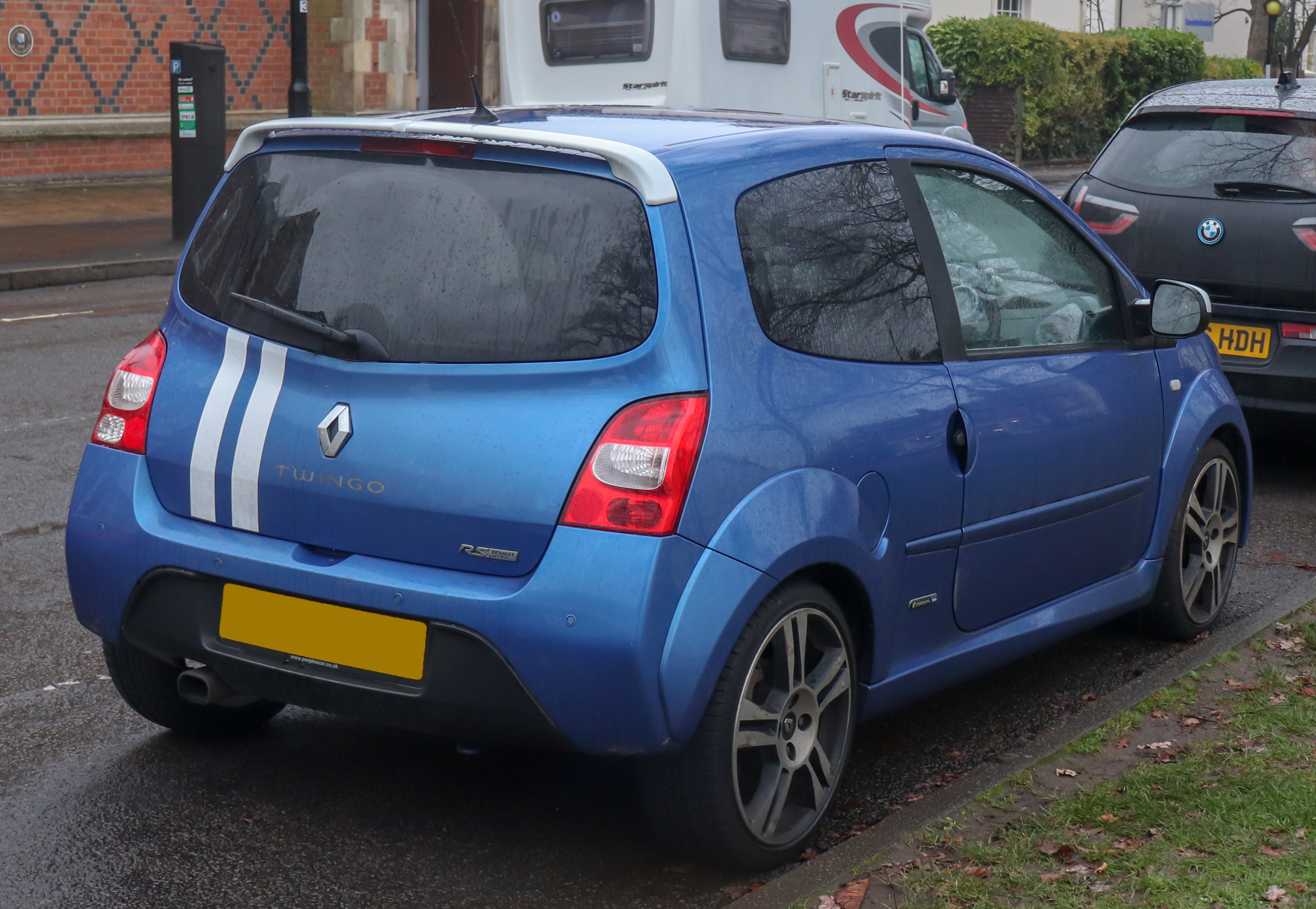
Renault Twingo RS Gordini

After presenting an initial concept at the 2006 Mondial de l'Automobile, Renault debuted the production Twingo II at the 2007 Geneva Motor Show with French market trim levels named Authentique, Expression, Initiale, Dynamique, and GT. Using the floorpan of the Renault Clio II, the Twingo II offered improved crash protection and was available in both RHD and LHD configurations. Production began in France and subsequently moved to the Revoz plant in Novo Mesto, Slovenia.

In January 2008, Renault debuted the Twingo Renaultsport 133, with a new 133 PS (98 kW; 131 hp) 1,598 cc engine, at the 2008 Geneva Motor Show. In August 2013, ordering and production of the 133 model ended.

In July 2011, Renault debuted a facelifted Twingo II at the Frankfurt Motor Show, featuring a design language subsequently used on their entire range and offering revised fascias, as well as redesigned front and rear light clusters.

On series 14, episode four of Top Gear, presenter Jeremy Clarkson road tested the Twingo 133 on Belfast streets and barrel rolled upside down through a sewage tunnel. After numerous accidents, he raced to catch a departing ferry, instead landing in the ocean.

On 16 March 2011, the Renault Twingo won the "best city car award" in the Parkers' New Car Awards.

Special editions in the UK included the Twingo Renaultsport Gordini, Twingo Gordini TCe 100, Twingo Bizu, Twingo Pzaz, Twingo Renaultsport Silverstone GP, Twingo Miss Sixty, and Twingo Renaultsport Red Bull RB7.

In Japan, the Twingo II was licensed by Nissan Motor Co., Ltd. and sold exclusively through Nissan Store locations.

Twingo II safety

Euro NCAP results:

- Adult occupant:, score 28 (The model tested was not equipped with curtain airbags. Available as an option.)
- Pedestrian:, score 11

=== Engines ===
Petrol engines
Model	Engine	Displacement	Power	Torque	CO_{2} emission
1.2 D7F	I4	1149 cc	60 PS (44 kW; 59 hp) at 5250 rpm	93 N⋅m (69 lb⋅ft) at 2500 rpm	132 g/km
1.2 D4F	I4	1149 cc	75 PS (55 kW; 74 hp) at 5500 rpm	105 N⋅m (77 lb⋅ft) at 4250 rpm	135 g/km
1.2 GT (turbo)	I4	1149 cc	100 PS (74 kW; 99 hp) at 5500 rpm	145 N⋅m (107 lb⋅ft) at 3000 rpm	140 g/km
1.6 RS	I4	1598 cc	133 PS (98 kW; 131 hp) at 6750 rpm	160 N⋅m (118 lb⋅ft) at 4400 rpm	160 g/km
Diesel engine
Model	Engine	Displacement	Power	Torque	CO_{2} emission
1.5 dCi	I4	1461 cc	85 PS (63 kW; 84 hp) at 4000 rpm	200 N⋅m (148 lb⋅ft) at 1700 rpm	94 g/km

== Third generation (2014) ==
Twingo III
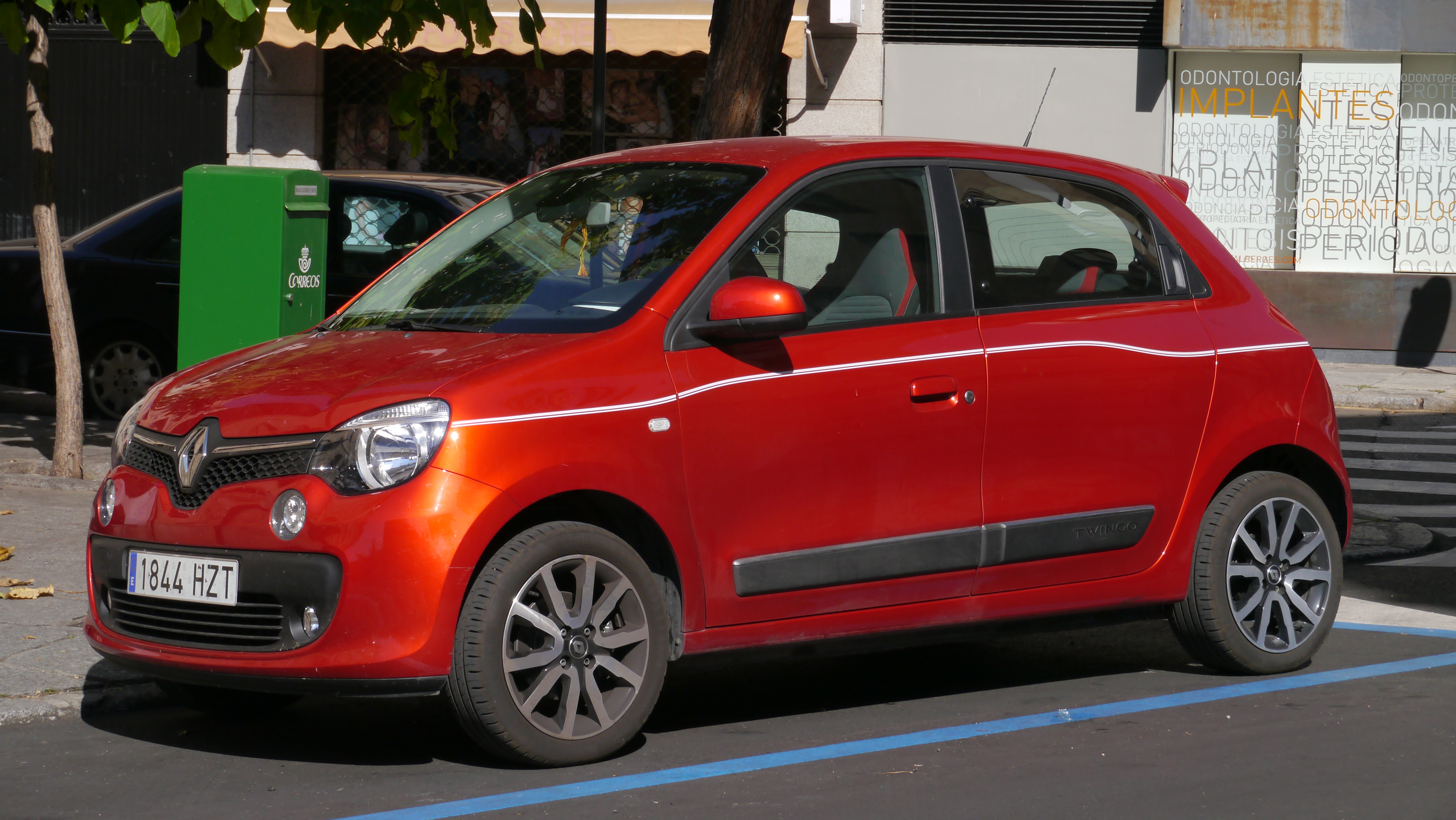

Overview
- Production: 2014–2024
- Assembly: France: Flins (Flins Plant); Slovenia: Novo Mesto (Renault Slovenia)
- Designer: Csaba Wittinger; Raphaël Linari

Body and chassis
- Body style: 5-door hatchback
- Layout: (Renault/Daimler "Edison" platform) Rear mid-engine, rear-wheel drive
- Related: Smart Forfour; Smart Fortwo

Powertrain
- Engine: petrol: 0.9 L H4Bt turbo I3; 1.0 L H4D I3
- Electric motor: synchronous electric motor (Twingo Z.E.)
- Transmission: 5-speed manual 6-speed dual-clutch

Dimensions
- Wheelbase: 2,490 mm (98.0 in)
- Length: 3,590 mm (141.3 in)
- Width: 1,640 mm (64.6 in)
- Height: 1,550 mm (61.0 in)

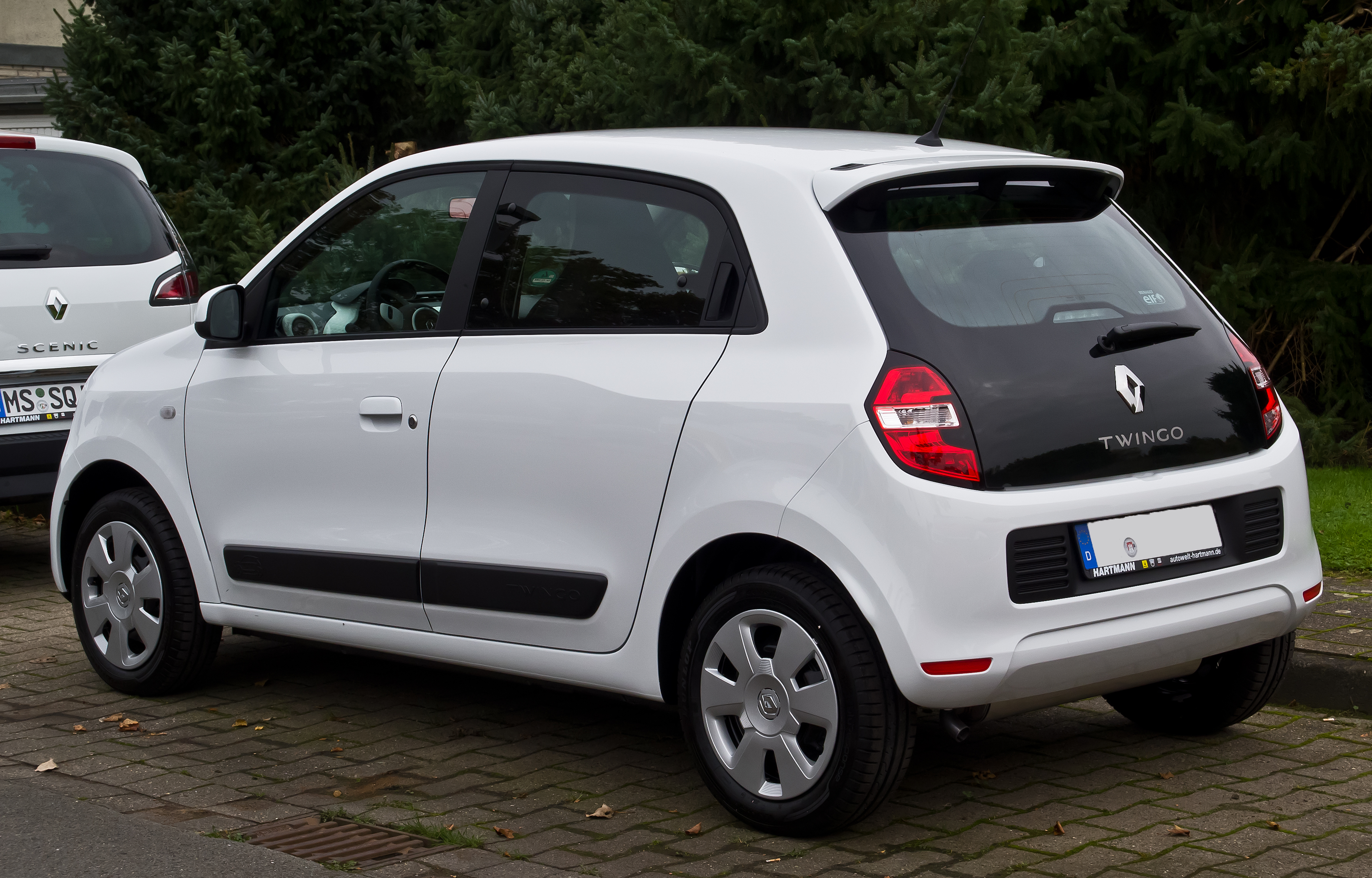
Renault Twingo Dynamique (Germany)

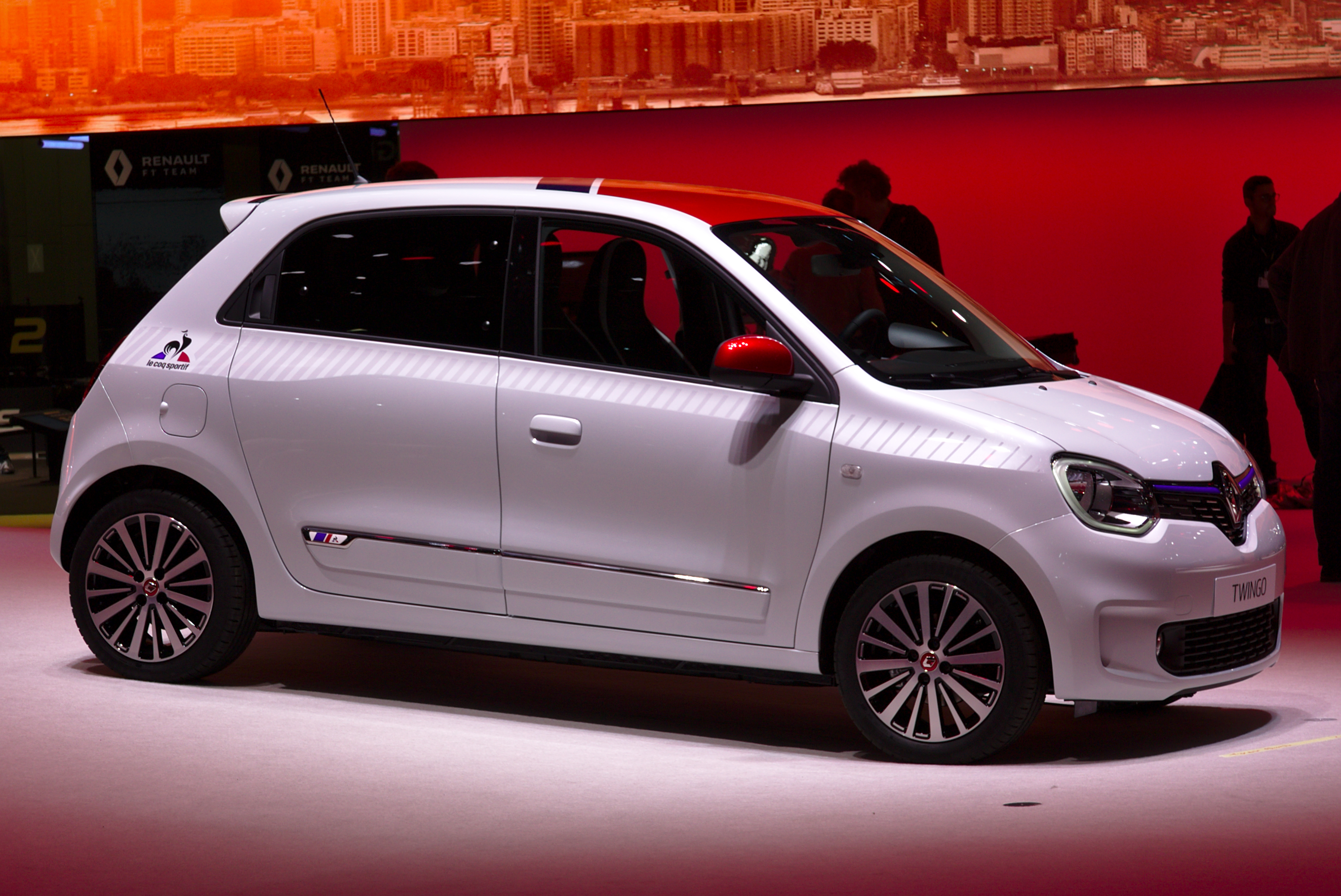
Renault Twingo, phase 2

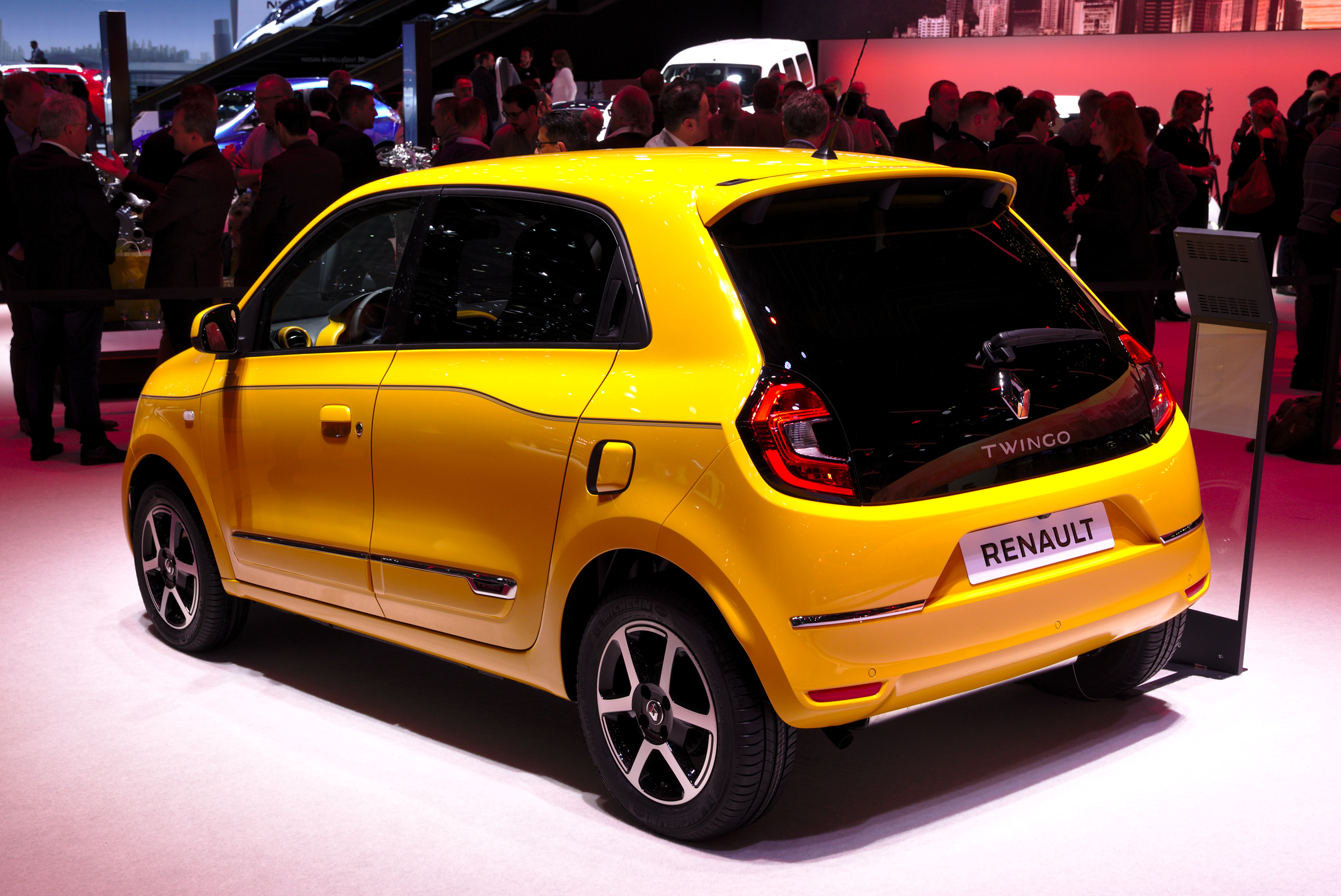
Renault Twingo, phase 2

The third generation Renault Twingo debuted in March 2014 at the Geneva Motor Show in a five-door, rear mid-engine, rear-wheel-drive layout. It was co-developed with Daimler's third generation Smart Fortwo and second generation Smart Forfour.

The third-generation Twingo and the ForFour entered into production in May 2014 in Novo Mesto, Slovenia, and were launched on the European market in September. Production ended in June 2024.

=== Design and development ===
In March 2010, Renault and Daimler, as part of their existing partnership, announced "Project Edison", a collaboration aimed at conceiving a shared platform for small city cars to be used by both companies. The Edison platform was designed from the start for mounting either an internal combustion engine or an electric motor as the main power source.

The first cars using the platform were the third-generation Twingo and the second-generation Smart Forfour. Renault and Daimler AG invested equally during the research and development phase, with Renault subsequently specializing in the engines and Daimler in transmissions.

Both companies tried to ensure a distinctive design. Renault designers took inspiration from the Renault 5 and the first generation Twingo. This can be seen by the "smile" at the front which was a design feature of the Twingo I. The engine was moved to the rear to allow them to expand the passenger cabin forwards, and allowed the car to have a 45° steering angle which means it had a 8.6 m turning circle and was capable of making tight turns in a city environment. The car was originally launched with four colour options, as with the original Twingo.

In January 2019, an updated Twingo was introduced with a new front fascia, cosmetic changes inside and out, and a new base 1.0 L engine; at the same time, declining sales in the UK (just 877 were sold in 2018) led Renault UK to discontinue marketing the right-hand drive model.

=== Technical details ===
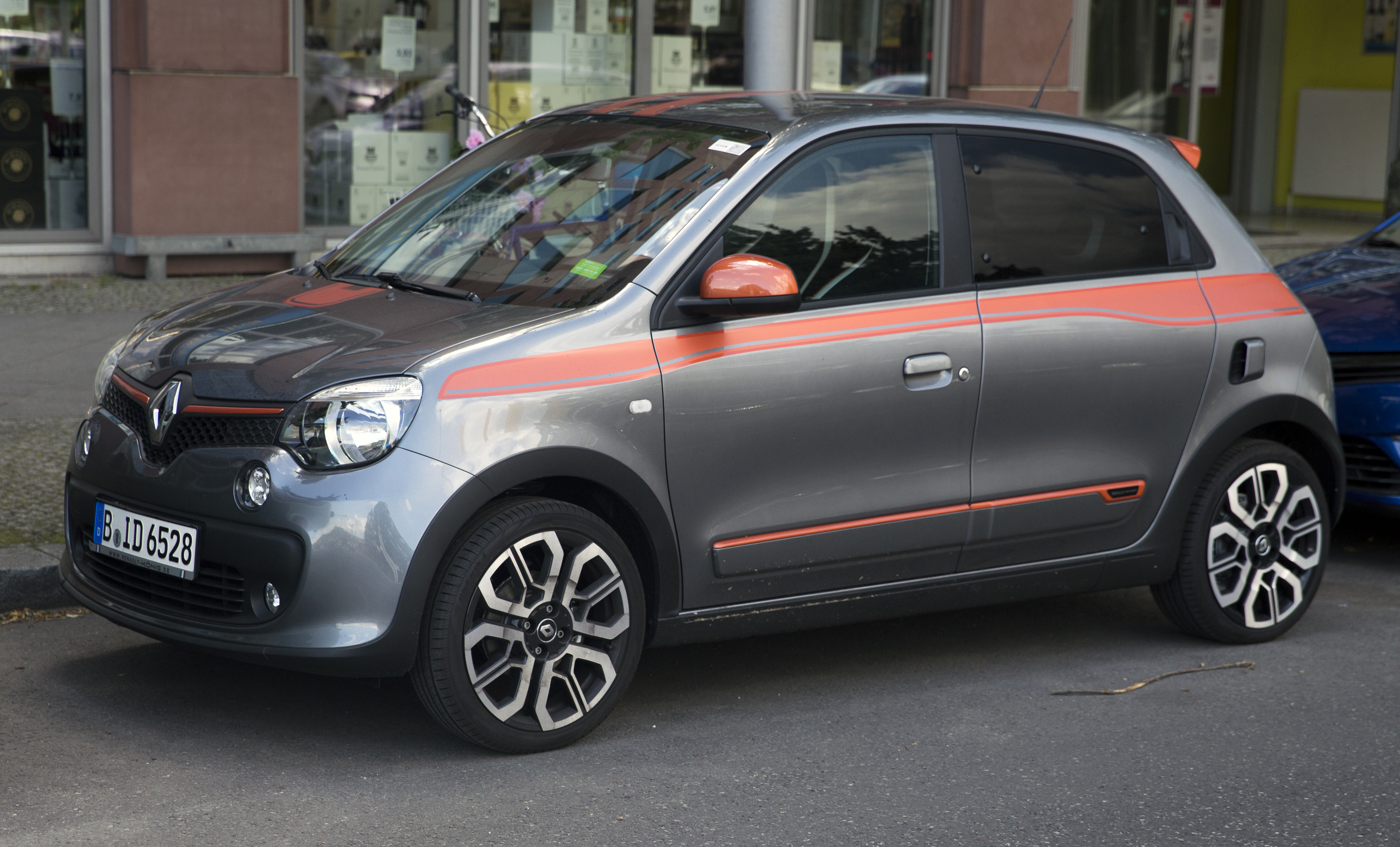
Renault Twingo GT Energy TCe 110, a sportier version

The Twingo III was about 10 mm shorter than the Twingo II. The rear-engine layout improved the manoeuvrability and the cabin space, but reduced the boot capacity. The suspension was composed of MacPherson struts on the front axle and a De Dion tube on the rear. The car used a five-door architecture, which differed from its three-door predecessors.

Brakes were ventilated disks on the front and drums on the rear. The bonnet featured a special opening mechanism and allowed only partial opening to give access to the windscreen washer fluid, brake fluid and coolant reservoirs, and to the battery.

==== Equipment ====
The car originally offered four trim levels: Expression, Play, Dynamique, and Dynamique S, with various customization packs. One option connects a smartphone with an instrument panel cradle (R&Go) and has an infotainment system (R-Link). Other levels such as the "Energy" trim have since been added. The GT model arrived in November 2016.

==== Safety ====
As standard, the car incorporates tyre pressure sensors, seatbelt reminders, four airbags, and four head and chest side airbags. It achieved a four star Euro NCAP test rating in 2014.

Euro NCAP test results* Renault Twingo (2014)
Test	Points	%
Overall:	4 /5 stars	
Adult occupant:	30	78%
Child occupant:	40	81%
Pedestrian:	25	68%
Safety assist:	7	56%

==== Engines ====
The car originally came with a three-cylinder petrol engine, either a 0.9-litre turbocharged unit or a 1-litre atmospheric. Both are fitted low and in a 49° angle to increase boot's capacity. In November 2016, a more powerful version of the petrol engine, the TCe 110, arrived for the sporting Twingo GT model.

Engine	Code	Displacement	Power	Torque	Top speed	0–62 mph (0–100 km/h)	Combined consumption	CO_{2} emissions
Petrol engines
SCe 70	H4D 400	999 cc	51 kW (69 hp) at 6,000 rpm	91 N⋅m (67 lb⋅ft) at 2,850 rpm	151 km/h (94 mph)	14.5 s	5.5 L/100 km (51 mpg_{‑imp})	126 g/km
Energy TCe 90	H4Bt 401	898 cc	66 kW (90 hp) at 5,500 rpm	135 N⋅m (100 lb⋅ft) at 2,500 rpm	165 km/h (103 mph)	10.8 s	4.9 L/100 km (58 mpg_{‑imp})	111 g/km
Energy TCe 110	H4Bt 401	898 cc	80 kW (109 hp) at 5,750 rpm	170 N⋅m (125 lb⋅ft) at 2,000 rpm	182 km/h (113 mph)	9.6 s	5.6 L/100 km (50 mpg_{‑imp})	128 g/km
TCe 110 EDC	H4Bt 401	898 cc	80 kW (109 hp) at 5,750 rpm	170 N⋅m (125 lb⋅ft) at 2,000 rpm	182 km/h (113 mph)	10.4 s	5.8 L/100 km (49 mpg_{‑imp})	132 g/km

=== Advertising ===
In February 2014, Renault organised a "strip tweet" online event to promote the Twingo III. The manufacturer commissioned to Publicis the conception of the car's European advertising. Publicis hired French artists duo Kuntzel+Deygas for the design of the visual campaign with the theme "Go Anywhere, Go Everywhere."

In 2015, Renault released a short music video, "All new Twingo : Show me a car !", in which a twee styled woman is searching a nifty car. It ends with a reference to "Papa & Nicole" adverts for the Renault Clio : "Papa! – Nicole? – Your seatbelt!". The brief video got a viral success in the United Kingdom, with approximately 300,000 views in four weeks. A Pop Up Store was opened at the Crémerie de Paris.

=== Reception and awards ===
In the United Kingdom, the new Twingo won the "City Car of the Year" 2014, TopGear Magazine Awards, "City Car of the Year" in the UK Car of the Year Awards and "Best City Car" in the Daily Express 2014 Motoring Oscars, "Best City Car" at the 2015 British GQ Car Awards.

Paul Horrell of Top Gear gave the car a score of seven out of 10, calling it: "a genuinely different approach to design and engineering that has brought real dividends, not just in being different for its own sake. Most important, it's much more fun than a base model supermini for the same cash." Auto Express and its sister publication CarBuyer scored it four out of five stars, praising its manoeuvrability, design, and rear passenger space but criticizing its wind noise and high price compared to its rivals. What Car? gave the car three out of five stars, saying: "The Renault Twingo mixes cheeky retro styling with genuine practicality. It’s neither as refined nor as comfortable as the best city cars, though."

=== Concept cars ===
The third-generation Twingo was previewed through two concepts, the Twin'Z and the Twin'Run.

==== Twin'Z ====
Renault Twin'Z
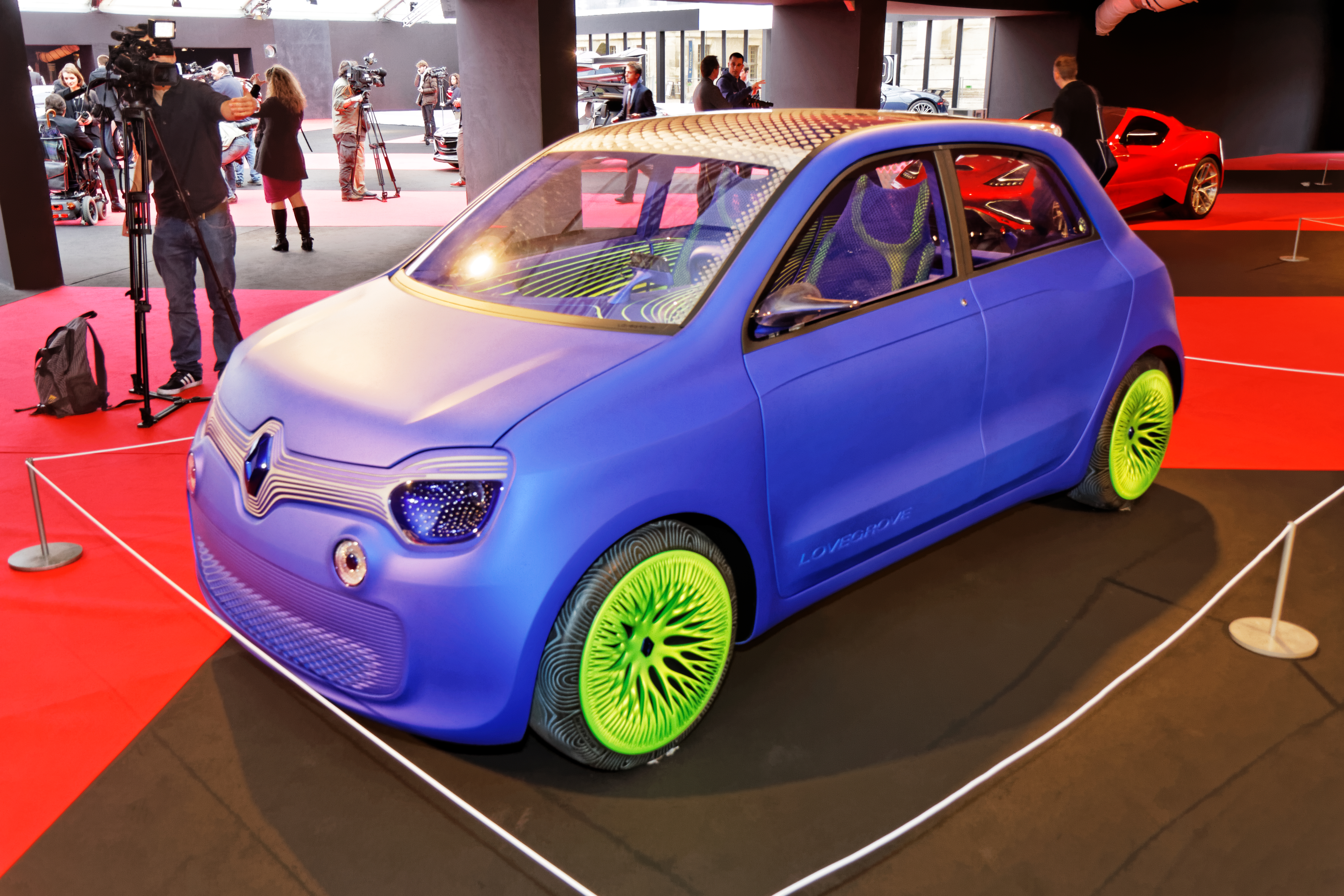

Overview
- Manufacturer: Renault
- Production: 2013 (Concept car)

Body and chassis
- Class: City car (A)
- Body style: 5-door hatchback
- Layout: Rear-engine, rear-wheel-drive

Powertrain
- Engine: Electric motor

Dimensions
- Wheelbase: 2,490 mm (98.0 in)
- Length: 3,590 mm (141.3 in)
- Width: 1,640 mm (64.6 in)
- Height: 1,550 mm (61.0 in)

The Twin'Z is a city car concept unveiled in April 2013. Its styling was created in partnership with British designer Ross Lovegrove. According to Renault's chief designer Laurens van den Acker, the purpose of its introduction was to "break down the boundaries between the world of an object whose calling is to be in movement, the automobile, and that of furniture." The concept has a rear-engine, rear-wheel-drive layout and is powered by an electric motor with a 49 kW (67 PS) power output and torque of 226 N⋅m (167 lb⋅ft). It has no B-pillar or dashboard and its doors open in conventional doors up front and suicide doors in the rear.

==== Twin'Run ====
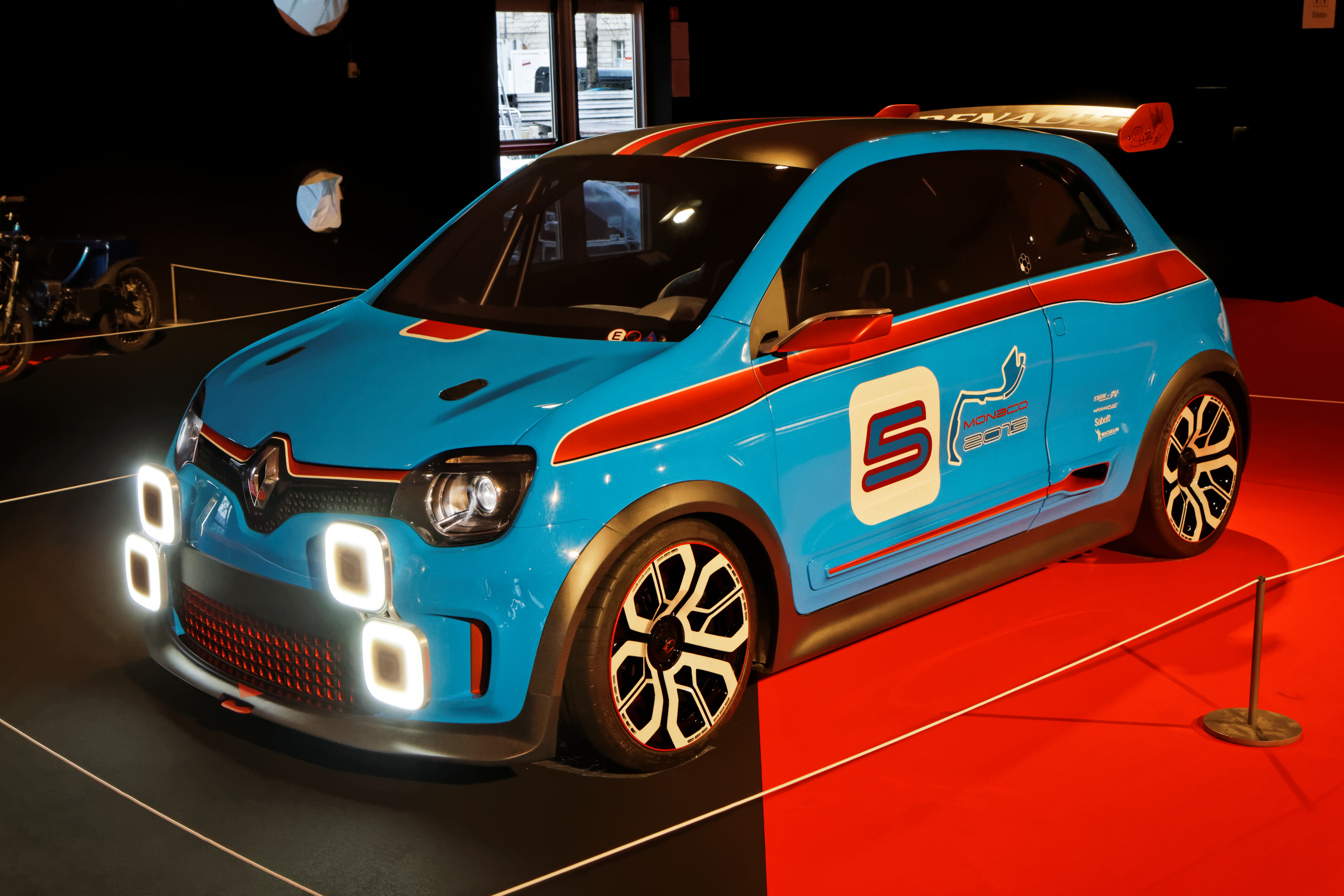
The Twin'Run concept

The Twin'Run is a rear wheel drive hot hatch concept developed by Renault with assistance of Tork Engineering and Poclain Véhicules, unveiled in May 2013. It is powered by a mid-mounted V6 engine with 320 hp (235 kW), coupled to a twin clutch six speed sequential gearbox and limited slip differential. It has double-wishbone independent suspension on both axles. The chassis is a tubular steel frame inspired by the Mégane Trophy and Renault 5 Turbo Maxi from WRC.

=== Twingo E-Tech Électrique ===
Renault Twingo Electric
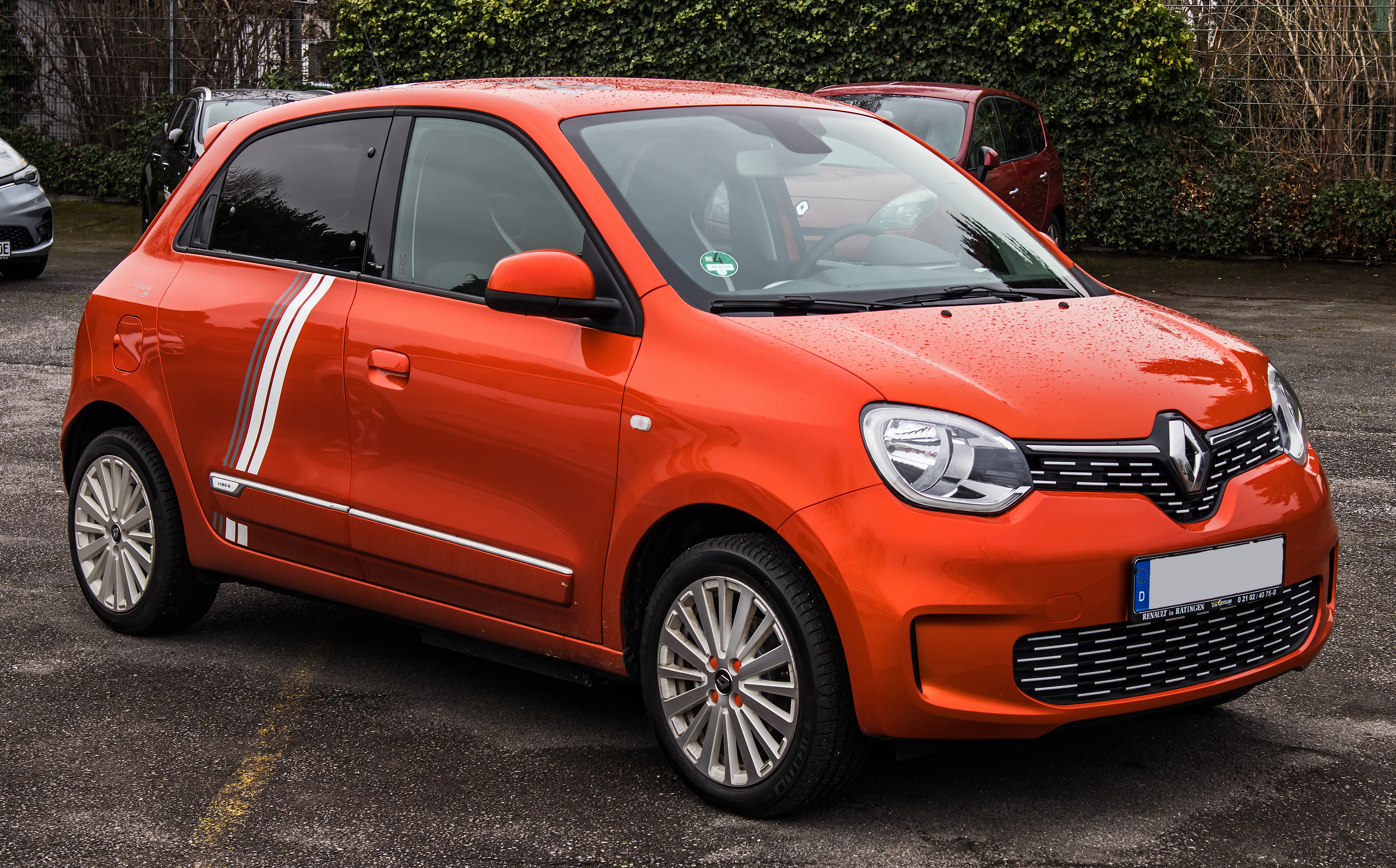

Overview
- Also called: Renault Twingo Z.E.
- Production: 2021–2024
- Assembly: France: Flins-sur-Seine

Body and chassis
- Related: Smart EQ Forfour

Powertrain
- Transmission: Automatic
- Battery: 23 kWh
- Range: 190 km (WLTP); 130 km (practice)

Dimensions
- Wheelbase: 2,492 mm (98.1 in)
- Length: 3,615 mm (142.3 in)
- Width: 1,646 mm (64.8 in)
- Height: 1,541 mm (60.7 in)
- Curb weight: 1,208 kg (2,663 lb)

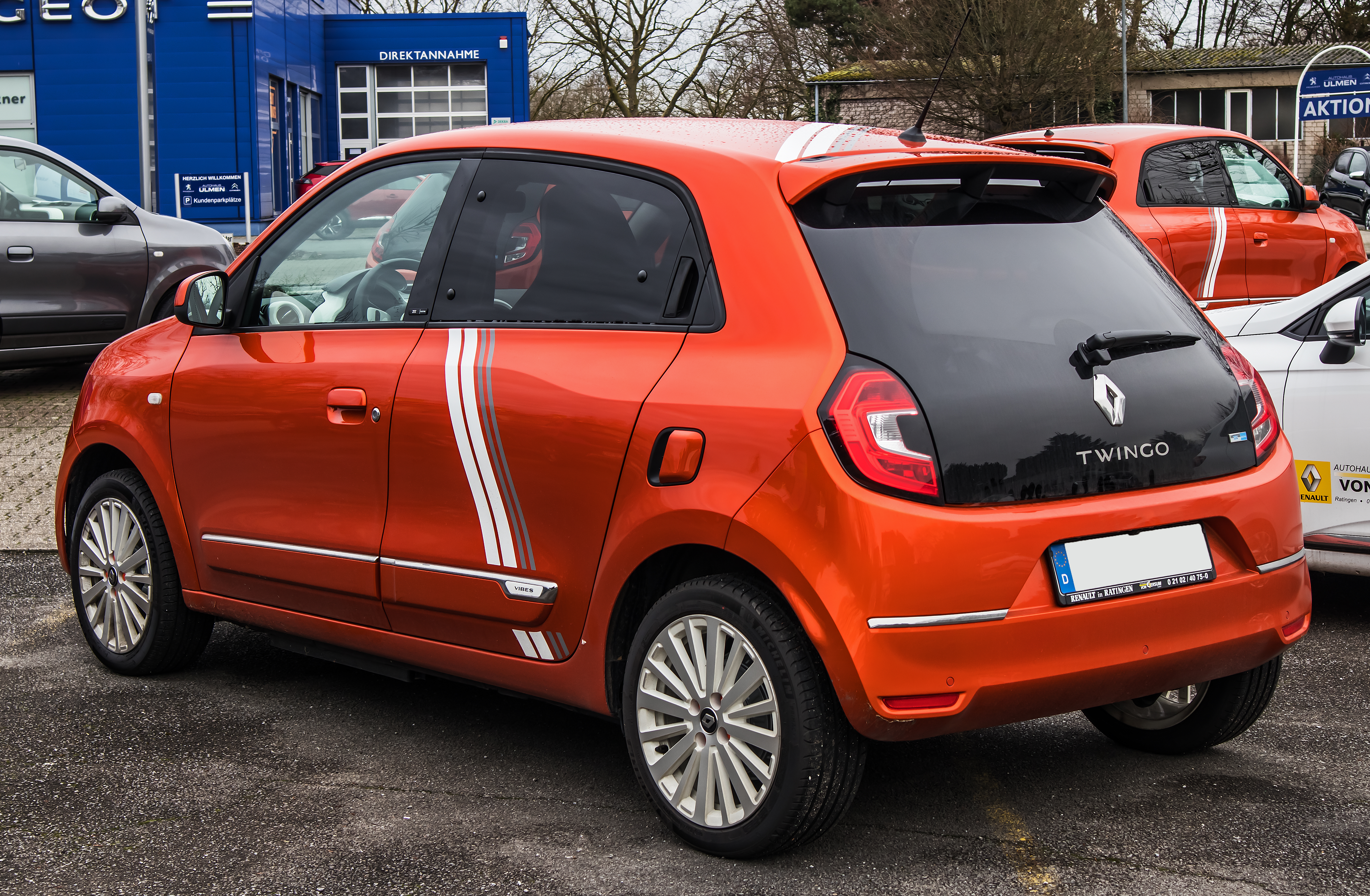
Rear

After plans to roll out new electric vehicles, including an electric Twingo, were confirmed in September 2019, Renault announced the Twingo Electric, marketed as the Twingo Z.E. (Zero Emissions) and in France as the Twingo E-Tech Électrique, the first-ever electric version of its city car, in February 2020 at the Geneva Motor Show. It is the second electric car from Renault, following the Zoe. The Twingo Z.E. drive train is based on that of the Smart EQ Forfour, with a larger battery. Renault CEO Luca de Meo confirmed in 2021 the entire Twingo range would be discontinued after the third generation, driven in part by the forthcoming Euro 7 emissions standards which was to be implemented in 2025. It was expected the A-segment Twingo to be replaced by the larger B-segment Renault 5 EV, though in 2023–2024, a fourth generation was released, called Twingo E-Tech Electric.

The starting price, announced the following September, was €21,350. It was not marketed in the United Kingdom, following Renault's withdrawal of the Twingo range from the UK market after the car model's facelift in 2019. A limited edition "Vibes" model, based on the regular "Intens" trim, was announced in July 2020; the special Valencia Orange colour was only available for the Vibes limited edition, but the Vibes could also be specified for any regular production colour, and was later made available for the conventional petrol-engines Twingo. Trim levels in 2022 included the Life (€21,550), Zen (€24,350), Intens (€25,550), and Urban Night (€26,650). Although the suggested retail price was high compared to a petrol-powered Twingo, the French government electric car subsidy of up to €7,000 or 27% of the price made the cost of the electric version comparable.

The car has a rated driving range of 180 or 250 km (110 or 160 mi) on the WLTP driving cycle (Full or City, respectively). The on-board charger, branded Caméléon, can accept AC electric supply at up to 22 kW; the lithium-ion battery, with 22 kW-hr capacity, incorporates lessons learned from the Renault Zoe. The battery itself weighs 165 kg (364 lb) and is positioned beneath the front seats. The vehicle is limited to AC charging sources only, as the vehicle supply interface port does not accept a DC fast charge plug. The rear-mounted R80 traction motor has an output of 60 kW (80 hp) and 160 N⋅m (118 lb⋅ft), and the car has a kerb weight of 1,112 kg (2,452 lb). The top speed is 135 km/h (84 mph), and the car can accelerate from 0–100 km/h (62 mph) in 12.6 seconds. The default driving mode "D" emulates the behaviour of a petrol-powered car with moderate "engine braking" when the driver's foot is lifted from the throttle; a more aggressive and adjustable "B" regeneration mode is selectable, but does not allow one-pedal driving at the highest regeneration level.

The base trim ("Life") was criticized for lacking expected basic features like a radio and air conditioning; however, the lack of vibrations and abundant low-end torque from the electric traction motor were appreciated for city traffic. The Twingo Electric was marketed against other low-cost city cars, such as the base model of the Fiat New 500, as well as Volkswagen E-up! and the VW's rebadged versions, the SEAT Mii electric and Škoda Citigo-e iV; internally, the Twingo also competed with the Dacia Spring; compared to the VW and Dacia, the Twingo Electric offered a smaller driving range.

== Fourth generation (Twingo E-Tech, 2026) ==
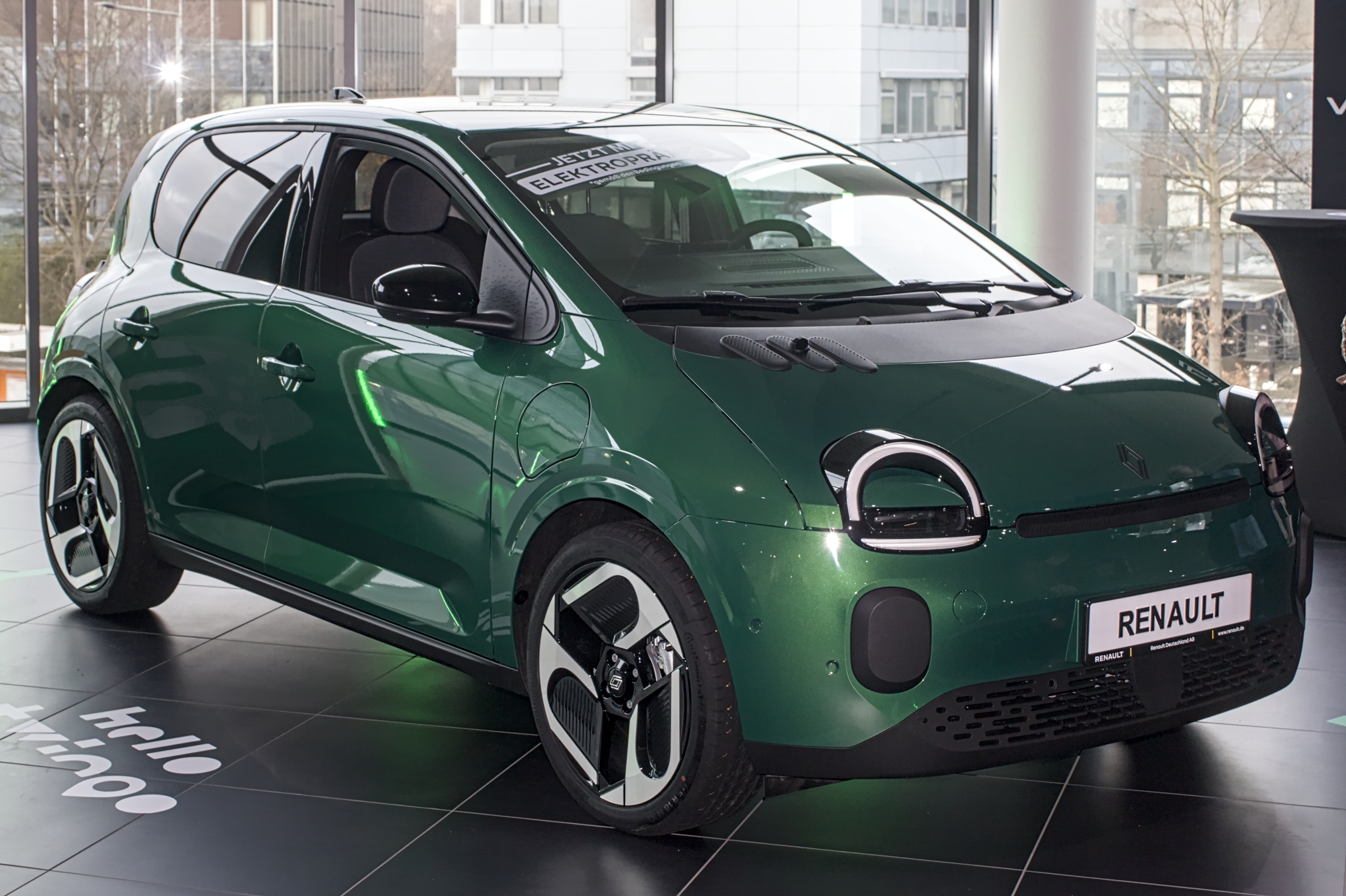
Renault Twingo E-Tech

In November 2023, Renault announced the return of the Twingo as an electric car with a price tag under €20,000. A prototype for the fourth-generation Twingo was shown at the Capital Markets Day press conference, featuring retro styling heavily reminiscent of the first-generation Twingo, continuing Renault's trend of retro styling for its future electric models, such as the Renault 4 E-Tech and the Renault 5 E-Tech. Efficiency figures of 10kWh/100 km were also announced.

Renault Group CEO, Luca De Meo, stated at the conference that development was to begin immediately and the car was expected to reach production within two years, matching the development speed of Chinese manufacturers, until the vehicle’s official unveiling in late 2025.

Two years after the concept car, in the final quarter of 2025, Renault revealed the production-spec model called the Twingo E-Tech. Like the previous generations of the Twingo, the fourth-generation model is being built at the same factory in Slovenia, and production commenced a year later, in 2026.
