= Renault D-Type engine =

Petrol engine from Renault

Renault D-type engine
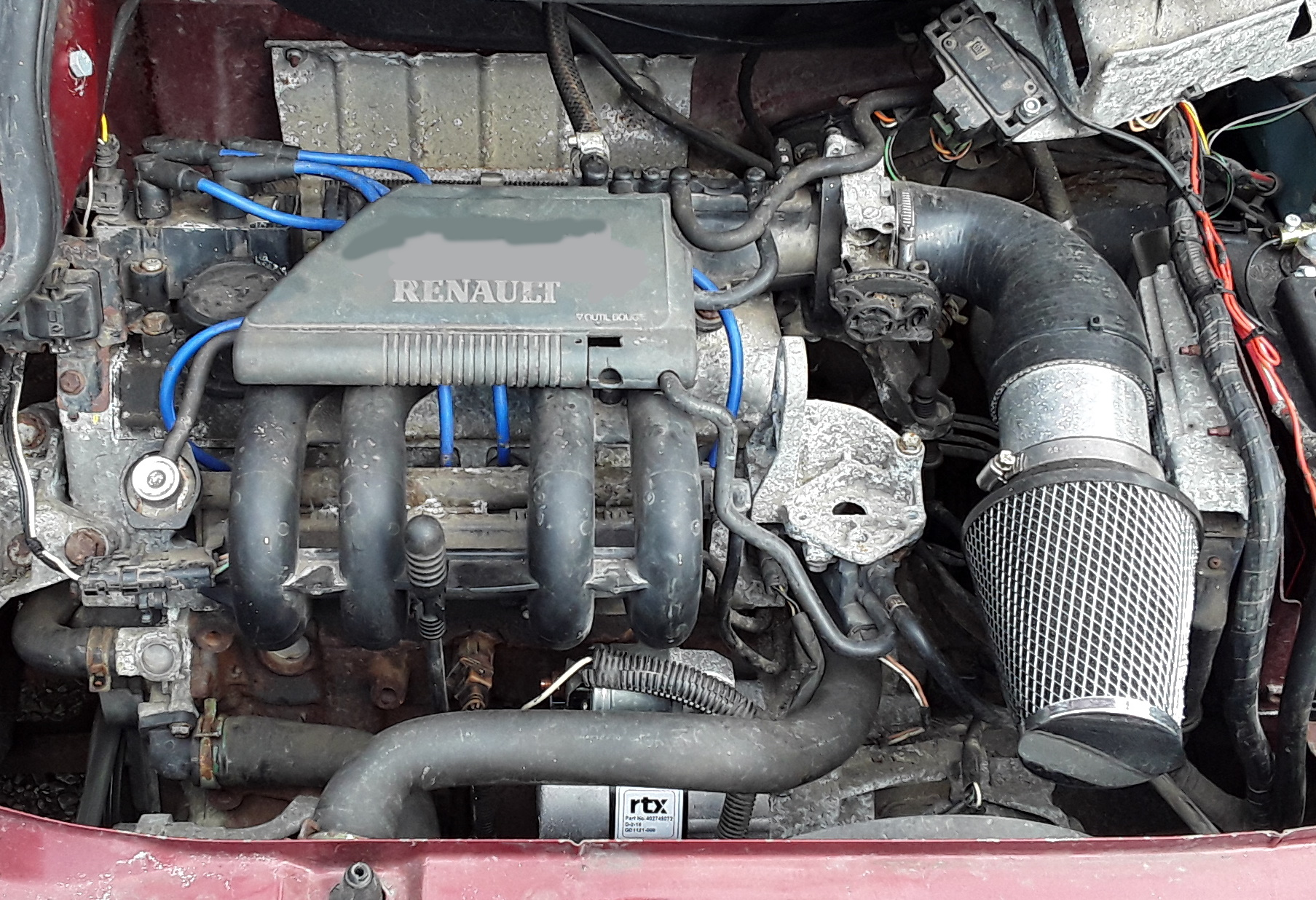
- Renault D7F in a 1997 Renault Twingo

Overview
- Manufacturer: Renault
- Also called: DiET engine
- Production: 1996–2019

Layout
- Configuration: I4
- Displacement: 1.0 L (999 cc); 1.1 L (1,149 cc)
- Valvetrain: SOHC 2 or 4 valves x cyl.

Combustion
- Turbocharger: On D4FT
- Fuel system: Sequential MPFI
- Fuel type: Petrol
- Cooling system: Water-cooled

Output
- Power output: 60–107 PS (44–79 kW; 59–106 hp)
- Torque output: 93–145 N⋅m (69–107 lb⋅ft)

Chronology
- Predecessor: Energy engine
- Successor: Renault H4x/H5x

The Renault DiET engine also known as "D engine" or "D-Type" is a straight-4 automobile petrol engine from Renault designed to replace the existing Cléon-Fonte engine in the Renault Twingo.

== History ==
The D Engine was designed because the 1.2-liter Energy Engine with its hemispherical cylinder head and exhaust up to the front of the head could not fit under the hood of the First generation Twingo.

In 1997, new European pollution regulations went into effect. Renault could have kept the Cléon-Fonte 1.2 on the Twingo and its Energy engine 1.2 on the Clio, by equipping them with multipoint injection and other technological improvement, but rather than investing in updating two different engines and because of the unexpected success of Twingo, they decided to opt for a new engine that could be mounted in the Twingo as well as the Clio – hence the creation of the D-Type Engine.

The D-Type engine has a hemispherical cylinder head incorporating the camshaft, with the exhaust placed at the back of the head in order to get under the hood of the First generation Twingo.

== D7F ==
First produced in July 1996, the D7F displaced nominal 1.1 L; 70.1 in^{3} (1,149 cc) and produced 60 PS (44 kW; 59 hp) at 5250 rpm and 93 N⋅m (69 lb⋅ft) at 2500 rpm. It had sequential multi-port fuel injection.

Applications:

- 1996–2000 Renault Twingo
- 1996–1998 Renault Clio I
- 1998–2005 Renault Clio II (Clio Campus to 2008)
- 1998 Renault Kangoo

== D7D ==
The D7D was a 1.0 L (999 cc; 61.0 cu in) 8-valve version.

Applications:

- 1997–2007 Renault Clio
- 1998 Renault Kangoo
- 2000–2001 Renault Twingo

== D4F ==
The D7F was succeeded by the D4F in December 2000. It was the same displacement but added 16-valve SOHC heads for 75 PS (55 kW; 74 hp) at 5500 rpm and 105 N⋅m (77 lb⋅ft) at 3500 rpm (D4F-702, D4F-712). It was revised in 2004 (D4F-722) to receive better intake design with much larger air filter extending torque range from 3500rpm to 4250 rpm. D4F-740 variant received changes to camshaft and valve lifters to allow lower idle at 650 rpm and shorter 1st and 2nd gear to help with extra weight of new Clio III introduced in 2005.

Applications:

- 2000–2014 Renault Twingo
- 2001–2019 Renault Clio
- 2006–2021 Renault Symbol
- 2004–2012 Renault Modus/Grand Modus
- 2005–2011 Proton Savvy
- 2009–2016 Dacia Logan
- 2009–2016 Dacia Sandero

== D4D ==
The D4D was a 16V 1.0 L; 61.0 in^{3} (999 cc) version.

Applications:

- 1997–2001 Renault Clio
- 1998 Renault Kangoo
- 2000 to 2001 Renault Twingo
- 2001 to 2005 Peugeot 206 in Brazil with a 1.0 Engine
- 2000 to 2016 Renault Clio, Renault Sandero and Renault Logan in Brazil with a 1.0 Flex Fuel Engine (Alcohol and Gasoline at same time)
- 2011 to 2015 Nissan March in Brazil (made in Mexico or made in Brazil) with 1.0 Flex Fuel Engine (Alcohol and Gasoline at same time)

== D4Ft ==
In an effort to produce a cost-effective fuel efficient engine Renault introduced a turbocharged version of the D4F, the D4Ft, in 2007. Renault named it the 1.2 TCE (Turbo Control Efficiency). This engine features revised 16-valve heads, stronger internals and lower compression ratio (from 9.8:1 to 9.4:1) to handle the higher stress caused by turbocharging, resulting in 101 PS (74 kW; 100 hp) at 5500 rpm and 145 N⋅m (107 lb⋅ft) at 3000 rpm.

Renault created the break by suggesting downsizing on petrol engines, with the range of TCe engines (Turbo Control efficiency). TCe engine — TCe 100, the best 100 bhp (75 kW; 101 PS) petrol engine due to its driving pleasure and moderate fuel consumption thanks to high and instant low/midrange torque rather than high power near redline. The TCe petrol engine (Turbo Control efficiency) offers the power output of a 1.4 L engine, the torque of a 1.6 L engine and the fuel consumption almost of a 1.2 L engine. It is responsive from low revs, flexible and has power in reserve while displaying the lowest fuel consumption figures for a 100 bhp (75 kW; 101 PS) petrol engine. It emits only 137 g/Km of CO_{2} on Clio 3 and 140 g/km of CO_{2} on Modus and the Twingo GT.

These unique qualities are obtained thanks to the combination of a 1.2 L capacity engine with a low inertia low boost pressure turbocharger whose response time is reduced to the minimum, through the use of a turbine and a small diameter compressor. It produces 91 to 107 PS (67 to 79 kW; 90 to 106 hp) and 78 kW (106 PS; 105 hp).

The turbocharger includes an "overpower" feature which temporarily boosts power output in 2nd, 3rd and 4th gears at engine speeds of more than 4,500 rpm (5 hp (4 kW) extra power and 6 N⋅m (4 lbf⋅ft) extra torque).

It is fitted to the following vehicles:

- 2007–2014 Renault Twingo
- 2007–2018 Renault Clio
- 2007–2012 Renault Modus
- 2010–2013 Renault Wind
