= Renault Wind =

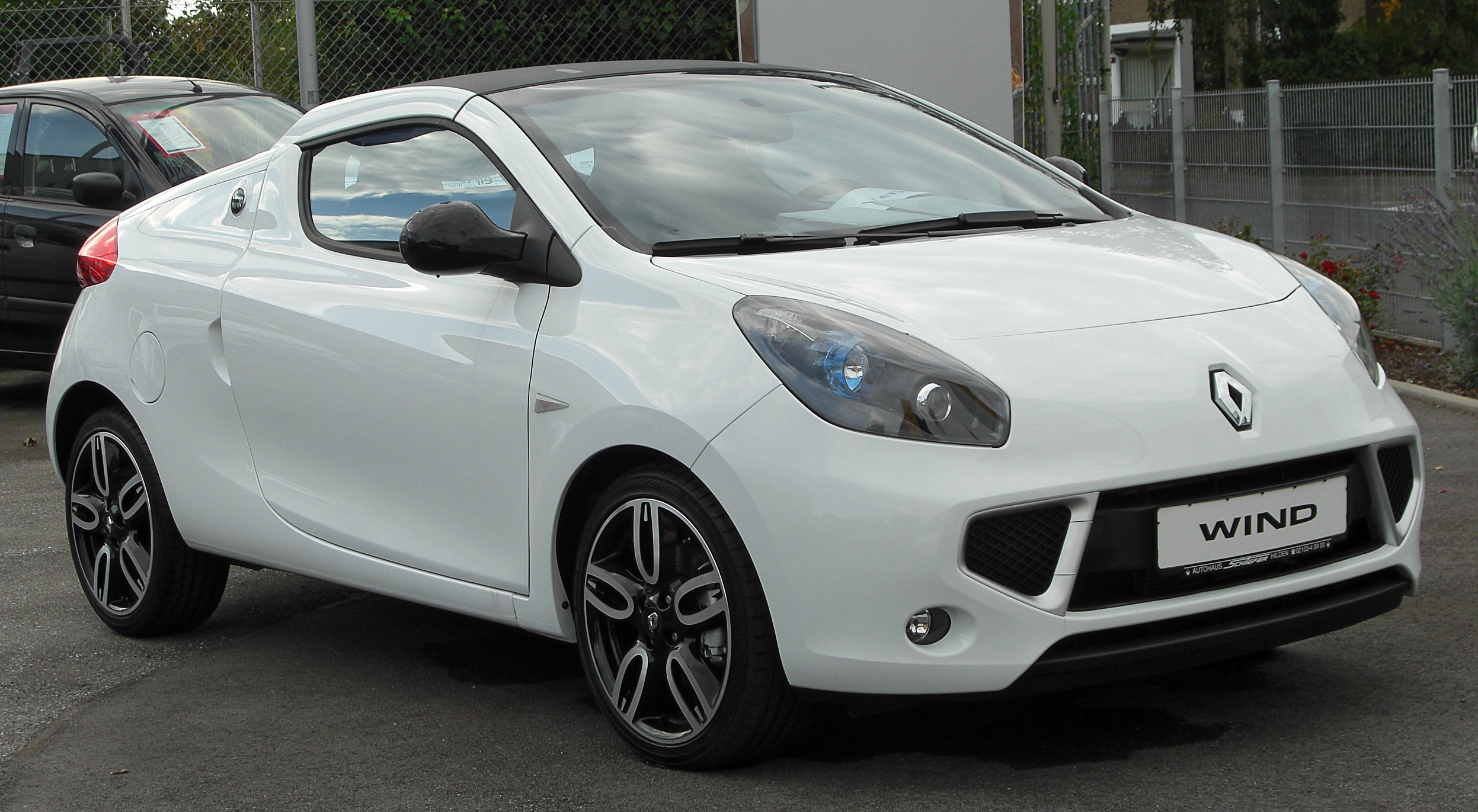

Overview
- Manufacturer: Renault
- Production: February 2010 – June 2013
- Assembly: Slovenia: Novo Mesto (Renault Slovenia)
- Designer: Yas Suzuki (exterior); Johann Ory (interior)

Body and chassis
- Class: Roadster (S)
- Body style: 2-door convertible
- Layout: FF layout
- Platform: Clio II
- Related: Renault Twingo

Powertrain
- Engine: 1.2 L D4FT turbo I4 (petrol); 1.6 L K4M-RS I4 (petrol)
- Transmission: 5-speed manual

Dimensions
- Wheelbase: 2,368 mm (93.2 in)
- Length: 3,828 mm (150.7 in)
- Width: 1,913 mm (75.3 in) including wing-mirrors
- Height: 1,381 mm (54.4 in)
- Curb weight: 1,206–1,248 kg (2,659–2,751 lb)

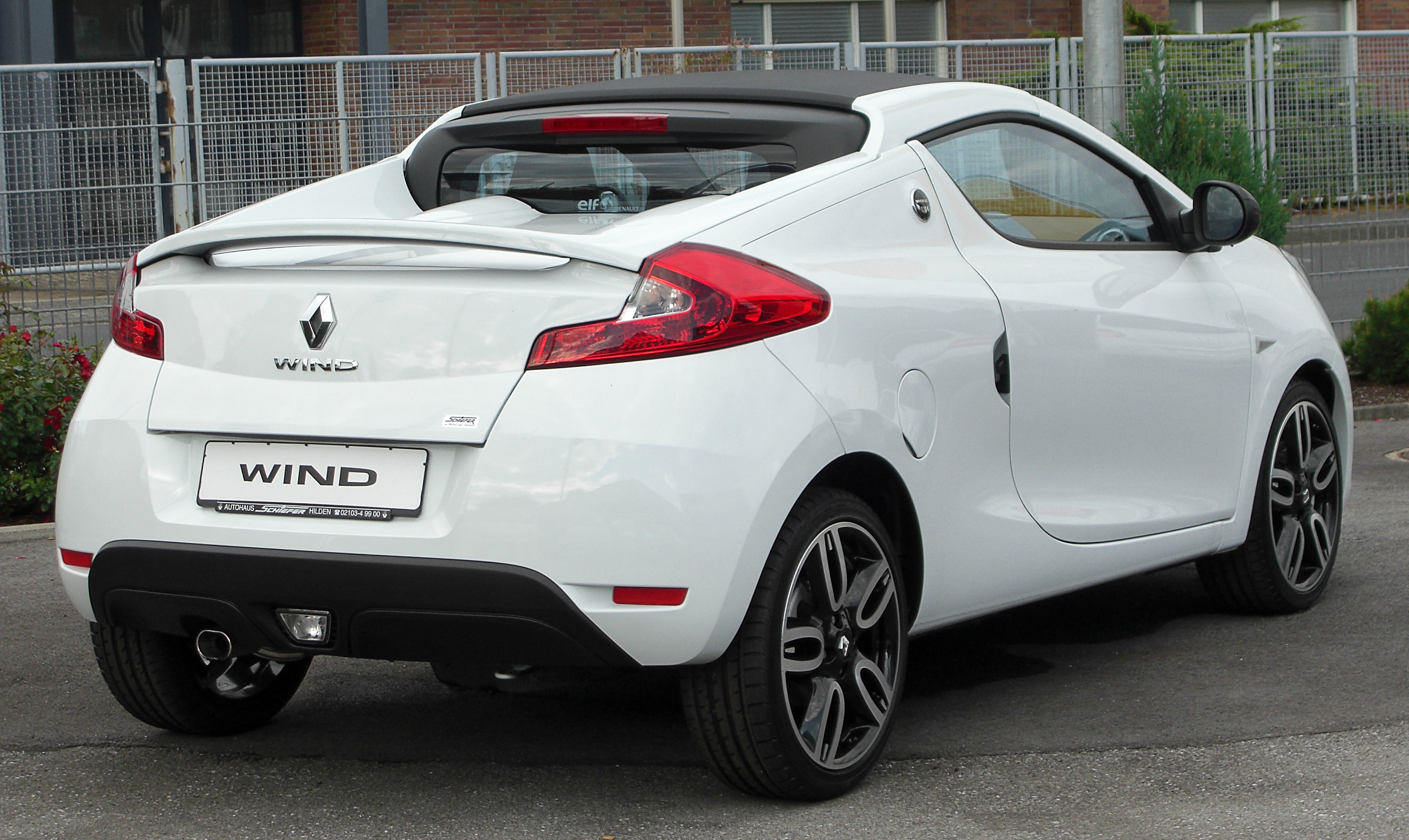
Rear view

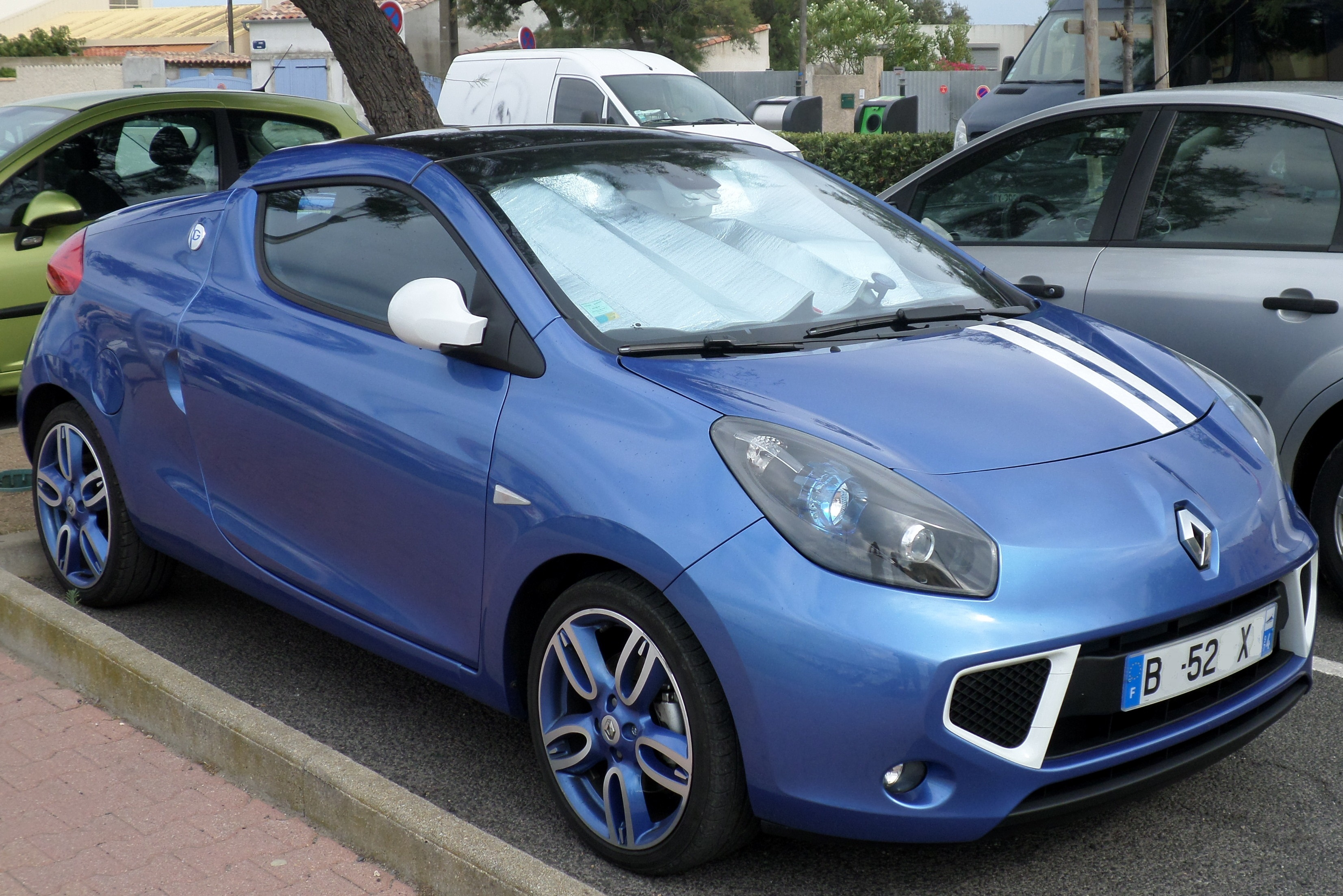
Renault Wind Gordini

The Renault Wind is a convertible car manufactured and marketed by the French automobile company Renault from 2010 to 2013. It is a two-seater roadster with a front-engine, front-wheel-drive layout.

It was originally presented as a concept car at the 2004 Paris Motor Show as a 2+1 roadster. On February 2, 2010, Renault announced that the Wind would enter production, presenting the production model at the 2010 Geneva Motor Show. The production version accommodates two passengers, as opposed to the 2+1 seating of the concept car. In February 2012, Renault retired the Wind along with the Espace, Kangoo Multix, Modus, and Laguna lines in the United Kingdom. For Mainland Europe, the Wind remained available through June 2013.

== Design ==
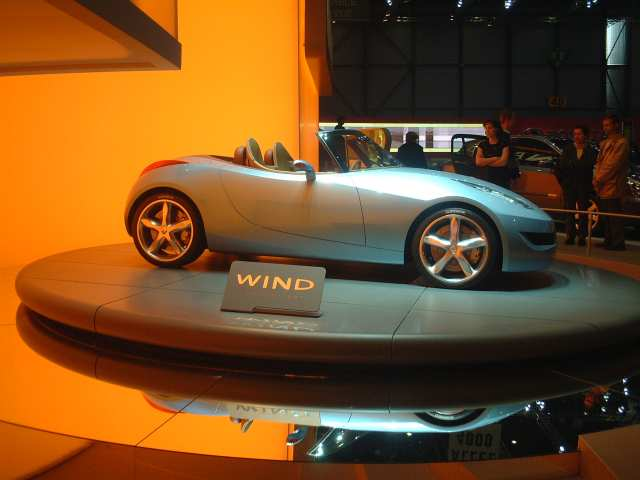
Renault Wind Concept

The Wind concept car was unveiled at the 2004 Paris Motor Show as a 2+1 roadster, and was powered by an inline 4 engine which produced 136 bhp (101 kW) and 141 lb·ft (191 N·m) of torque.

The concept Wind's design evoked the performance versions of the Clio and Mégane, while the production model is heavily based on the Twingo, evident in its overall size and stance, as well as its windscreen wiper mechanism, and also its semi-circular door handles exactly the same as those on the Twingo. The steering wheel and pedal assemblies in the concept are adjustable and fold away automatically when the door is opened for easier access.

Having purchased rights to the technology behind Ferrari's Superamerica roof, Renault adapted the system to the Wind, adding a boot canopy. Like the Superamerica, and unlike the multi-panel systems of other retractable roof convertibles, the Wind uses a single-piece metal roof that rotates 180° rearward for storage, with Renault reporting a twelve second closure time.

== Engine ==
The Wind is equipped with a straight-4 petrol engine: either the 1.2 litre TCE turbocharged engine producing 100 bhp (100 PS; 75 kW), or a 1.6 litre naturally aspirated engine producing 133 bhp (135 PS; 99 kW) shared with the Twingo Renault Sport.

== Trim levels ==
There were three trim levels: Dynamique, Dynamique S, and the limited edition "Collection". The Dynamique trim line was the most basic, with 16" alloy wheels and air conditioning as standard features.

The Dynamique S trim was above this, with 17" Speedline alloy wheels and climate control. The Limited Edition "Collection" trim had the biggest range of features, including a gloss black retractable roof and red and chrome dashboard inserts. In the United Kingdom, trim levels included: Dynamique, Dynamique S, GT Line, and the top of the range Collection.

== See also ==
- Renault Clio
- Renault Twingo
