= Erad =

Erad or ERAD may refer to:

- Endoplasmic-reticulum-associated protein degradation
- Erad, Iran, a city in Fars Province
- European Conference on Radar in Meteorology and Hydrology
- Automobiles ERAD (Études et Réalisations du Douaisis), a French manufacturer of microcars
- abbreviation of exaradian (Erad), a unit of angle
- abbreviation of exarad (Erad), a unit of radiation dose

== See also ==
- Irad, a Biblical name
