= Secma F16 =

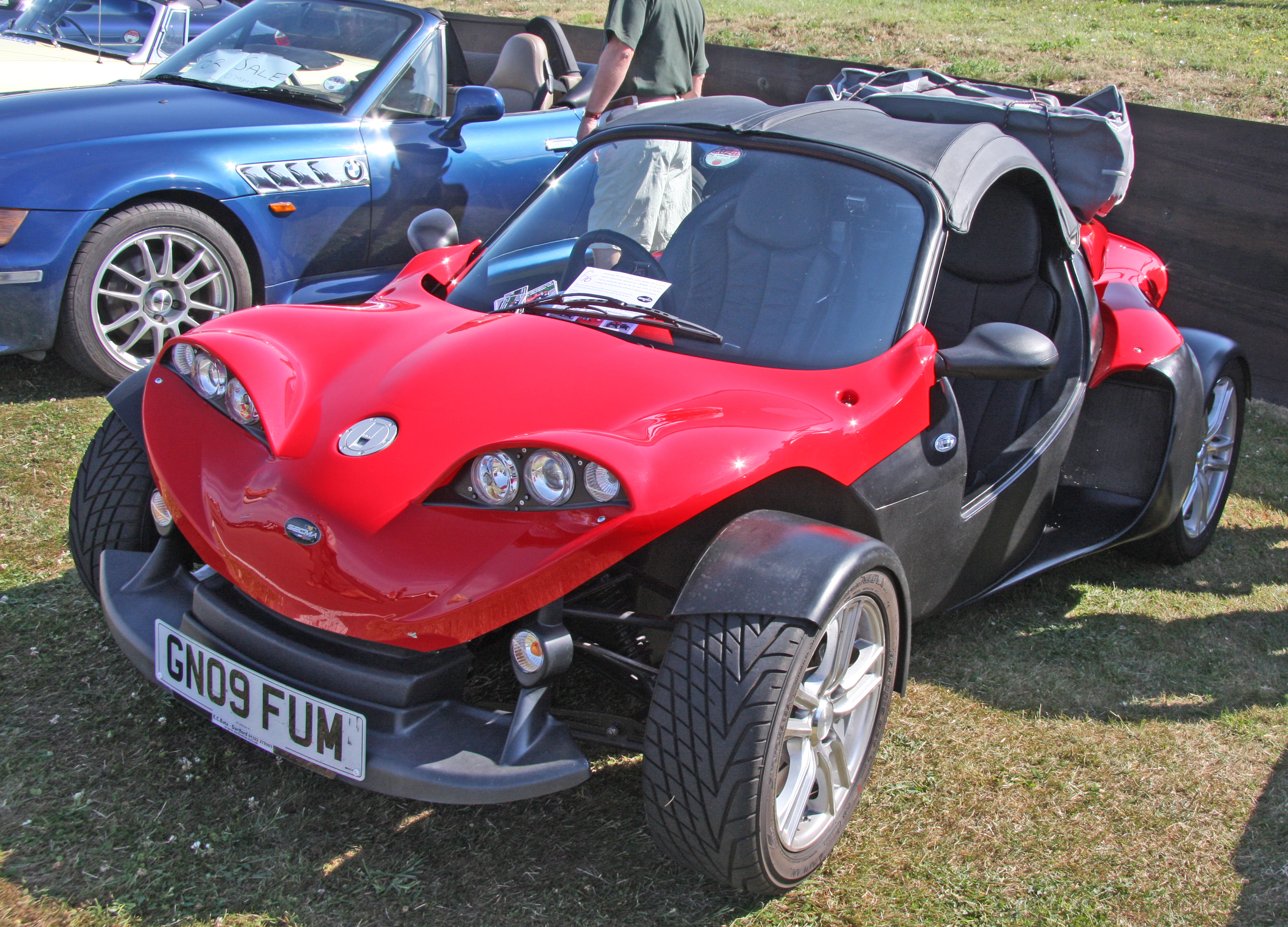

Overview
- Manufacturer: SECMA
- Production: 2008 – present
- Assembly: France: Aniche

Body and chassis
- Class: Sports car
- Body style: Roadster with 2 gull-wing doors
- Layout: Rear mid-engine, rear-wheel-drive

Powertrain
- Engine: Petrol: 1.6 L 16v K4M I4; 1.6 L THP turbo I4 (Turbo GT & Retro); 1.6 L Renault H4M straight-4 (Retro)
- Transmission: 5-speed manual

Dimensions
- Wheelbase: 2,000 mm (78.7 in); 2,320 mm (91.3 in) (Turbo); 2,320 mm (91.3 in) (Turbo GT); 2,420 mm (95.3 in) (Retro)
- Length: 2,750 mm (108.3 in); 3,180 mm (125.2 in) (Turbo); 3,180 mm (125.2 in) (Turbo GT); 3,260 mm (128.3 in) (Retro)
- Width: 1,760 mm (69.3 in); 1,730 mm (68.1 in) (Turbo); 1,730 mm (68.1 in) (Turbo GT); 1,680 mm (66.1 in) (Retro)
- Height: 1,100 mm (43.3 in); 1,160 mm (45.7 in) (Turbo); 1,160 mm (45.7 in) (Turbo GT); 1,160 mm (45.7 in) (Retro)
- Kerb weight: 567 kg (1,250 lb); 673 kg (1,484 lb) (Turbo); 657 kg (1,448 lb) (Turbo GT); 673 mm (26.5 in) (Retro)

The Secma F16 is a French micro sports car made by Secma. It is powered by the 105 PS (77 kW; 104 hp) Renault K4M engine.

== Overview ==
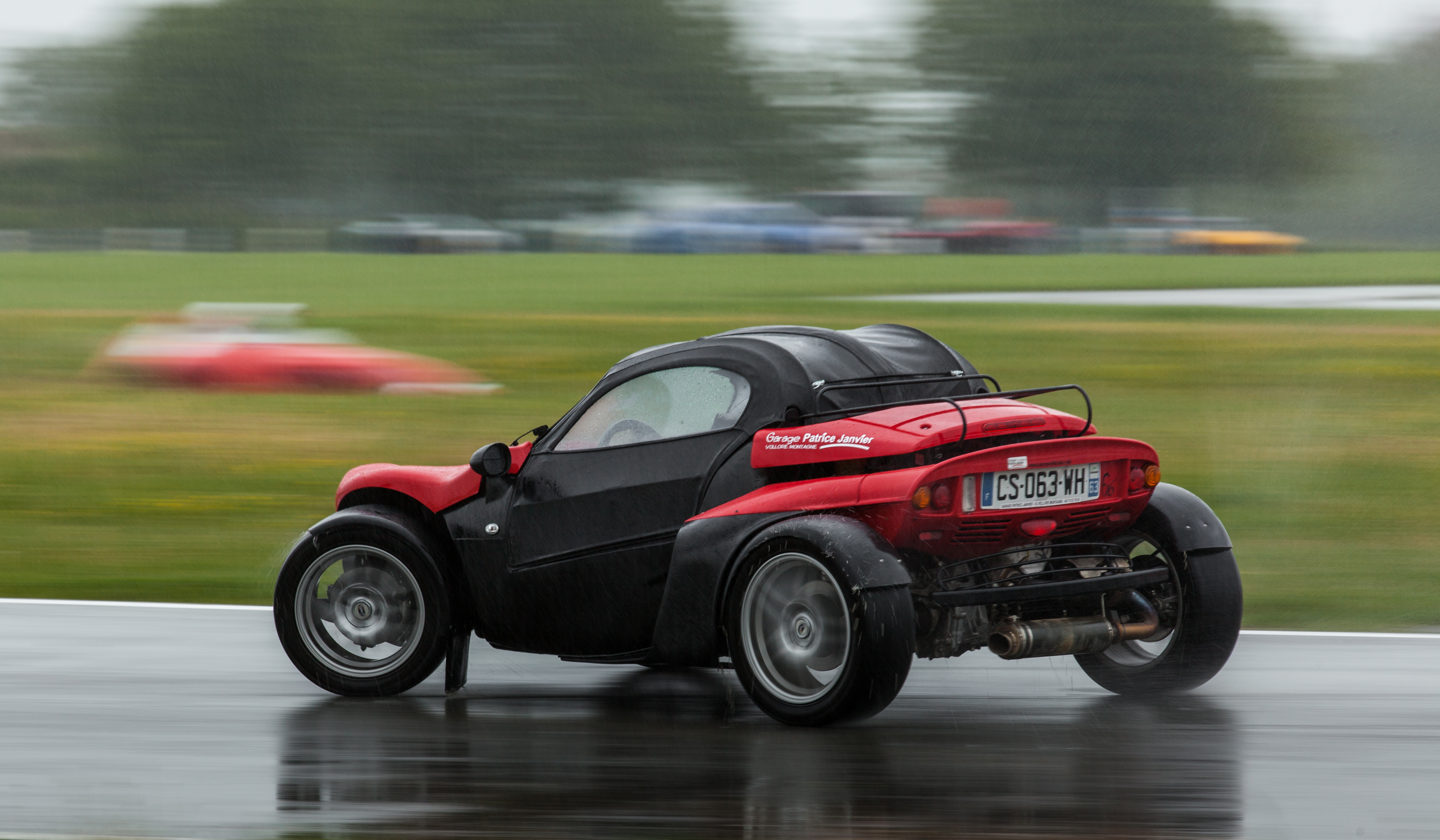
Rear end

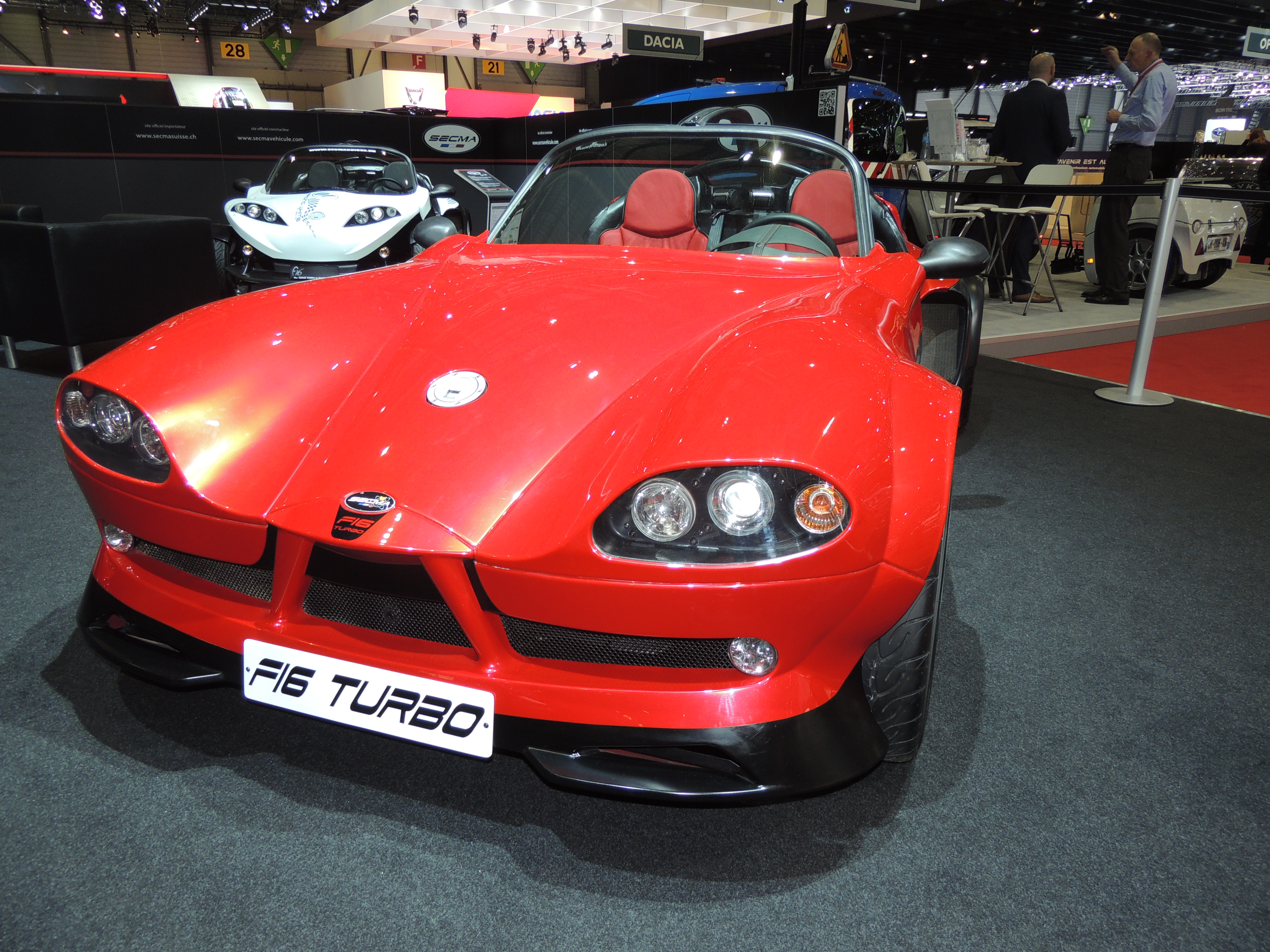
Secma F16 Turbo at the 2016 Geneva Motor Show

In 2016, a new version using the turbocharged THP engine from the Peugeot 308 GT was released, called the Secma F16 Turbo. This features a fully enveloped front end, which was updated with smoother styling in July 2022. Power for this model is 225 PS (165 kW; 222 hp). The F16 weighs in at 583 kg (1,285 lb), while the turbo weighs 673 kg (1,484 lb).

The F16 Turbo GT was unveiled in 2022 with a different front design and 225 hp (168 kW).In 2026, the F16 Retro was unveiled with a vintage design and two engine options: 225 PS (165 kW; 222 hp) the turbocharged THP engine from the Peugeot 308 GT or 115 PS (85 kW; 113 hp) Renault H4M engine.

== Models ==
- 2008 – present: F16
- 2016 – present: F16 Turbo
- 2022 – present: F16 Turbo GT
- 2026 – present: F16 Retro
