= Renault Modus =

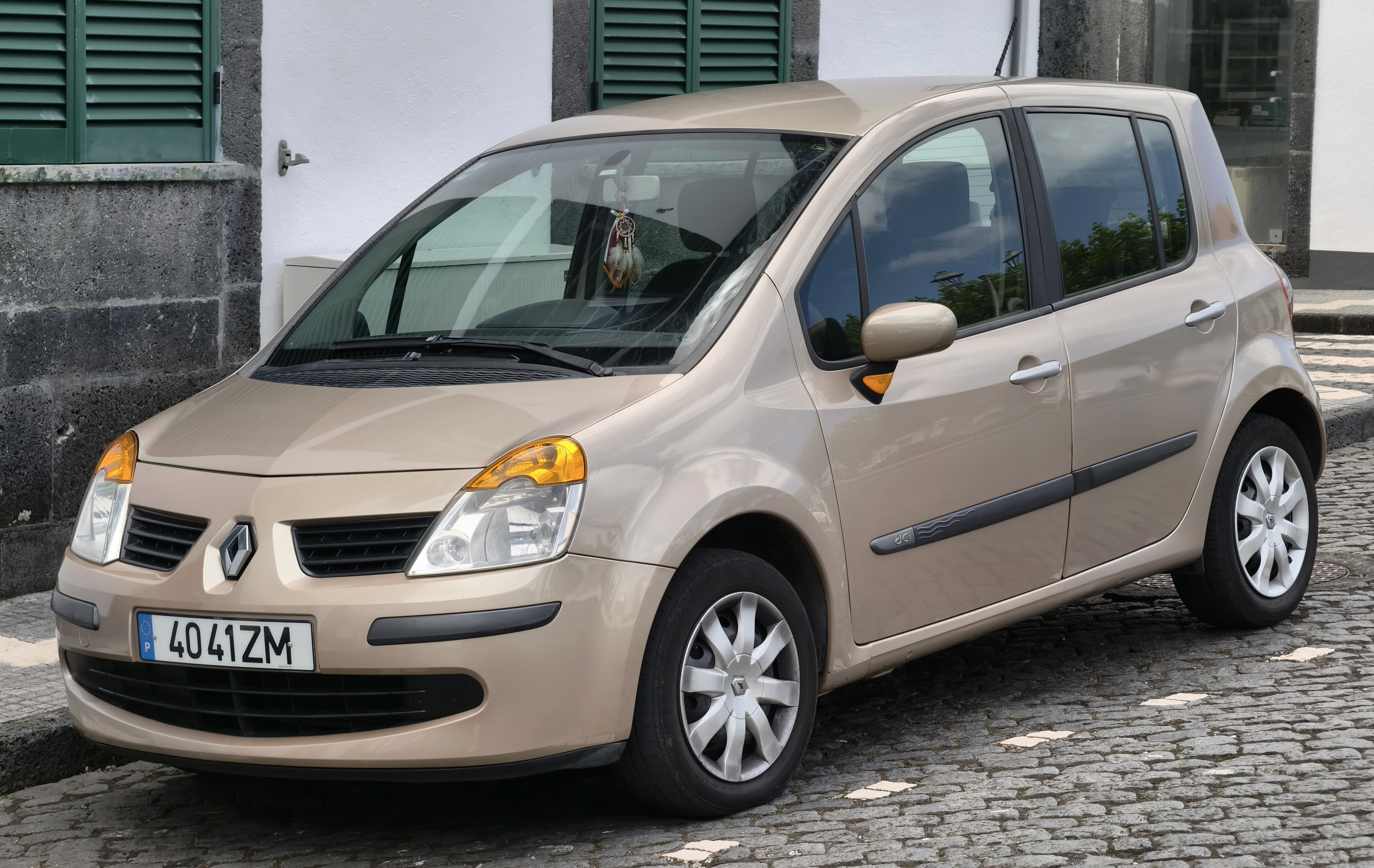

Overview
- Manufacturer: Renault
- Also called: Renault Grand Modus
- Production: August 2004 – December 2012
- Assembly: Spain: Valladolid (Renault Spain)

Body and chassis
- Class: Mini MPV (M)
- Body style: 5-door mini MPV
- Layout: Front-engine, front-wheel-drive
- Platform: Alliance B platform
- Related: Renault Clio

Powertrain
- Engine: Petrol: 1.2 L D4F 16V I4; 1.2 L D4FT 16V turbo I4; 1.4 L K4J 16V I4; 1.6 L K4M 16V I4; Diesel: 1.5 L K9K common rail I4
- Transmission: 5-speed manual 6-speed manual 4-speed automatic 5-speed automated manual

Dimensions
- Wheelbase: 2,482 mm (97.7 in) (Modus); 2,575 mm (101.4 in) (Grand Modus)
- Length: 3,792 mm (149.3 in) (Modus); 4,034 mm (158.8 in) (Grand Modus)
- Width: 1,695 mm (66.7 in)
- Height: 1,590 mm (62.6 in)

The Renault Modus is a mini MPV produced by the French manufacturer Renault from August 2004 to December 2012, in Valladolid, Spain. The production version is very similar to the concept car of the same name, which was presented at the 2004 Geneva Motor Show. It is essentially a taller version of the Clio III and, as such, shared its platform and much of its engine range with the third generation of the Clio.

A longer wheelbase version was produced as the Renault Grand Modus. Originally marketed as "a higher-range alternative to the Twingo and Clio", it aimed to provide the practicality and versatility of the larger Renault Scénic in a smaller footprint. The Clio platform that spawned the Modus also gave rise to the current Nissan Micra and its monospace relative, the Nissan Note.

== Design features ==
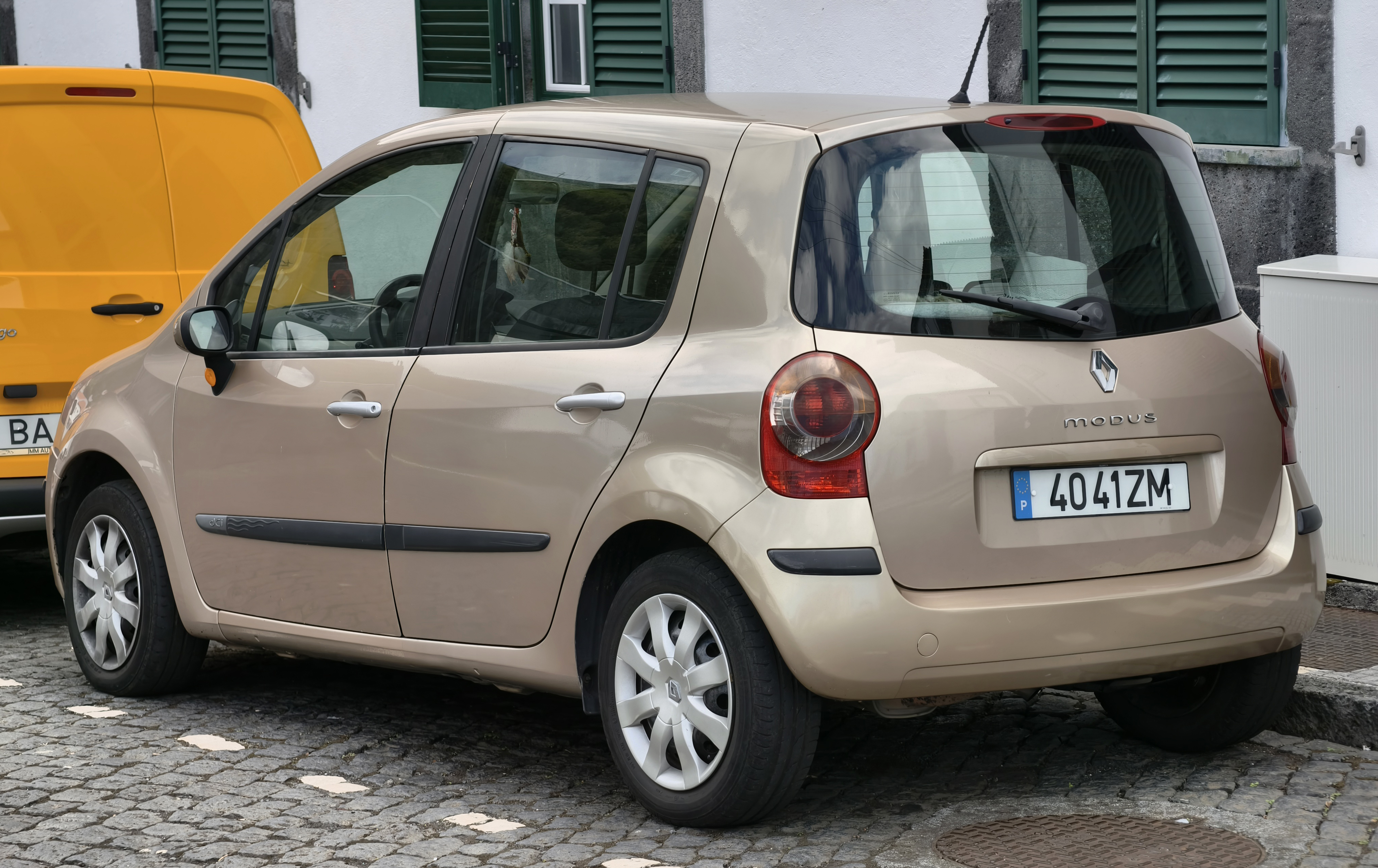
Rear (pre-facelift)

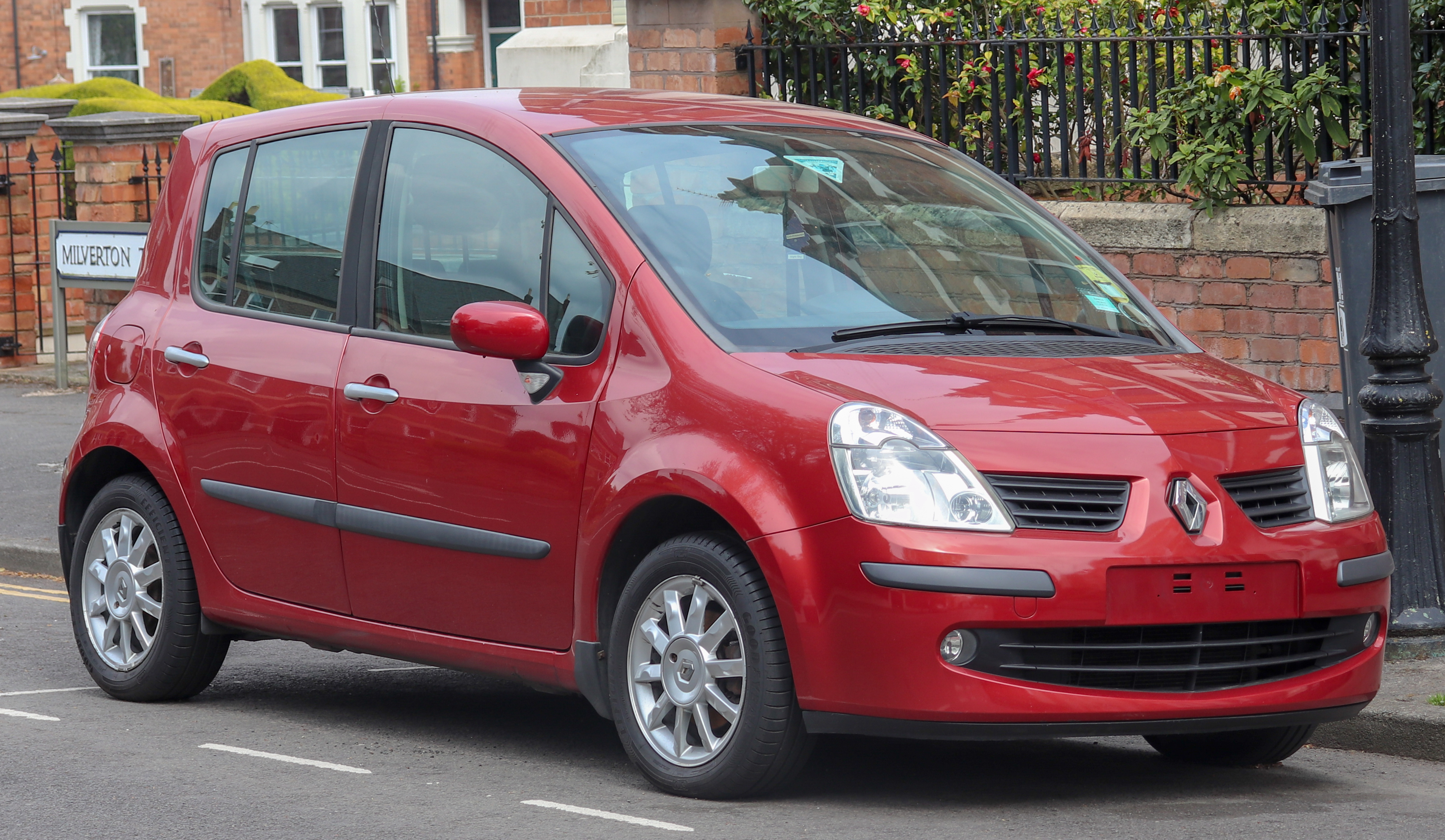
Front (minor facelift)

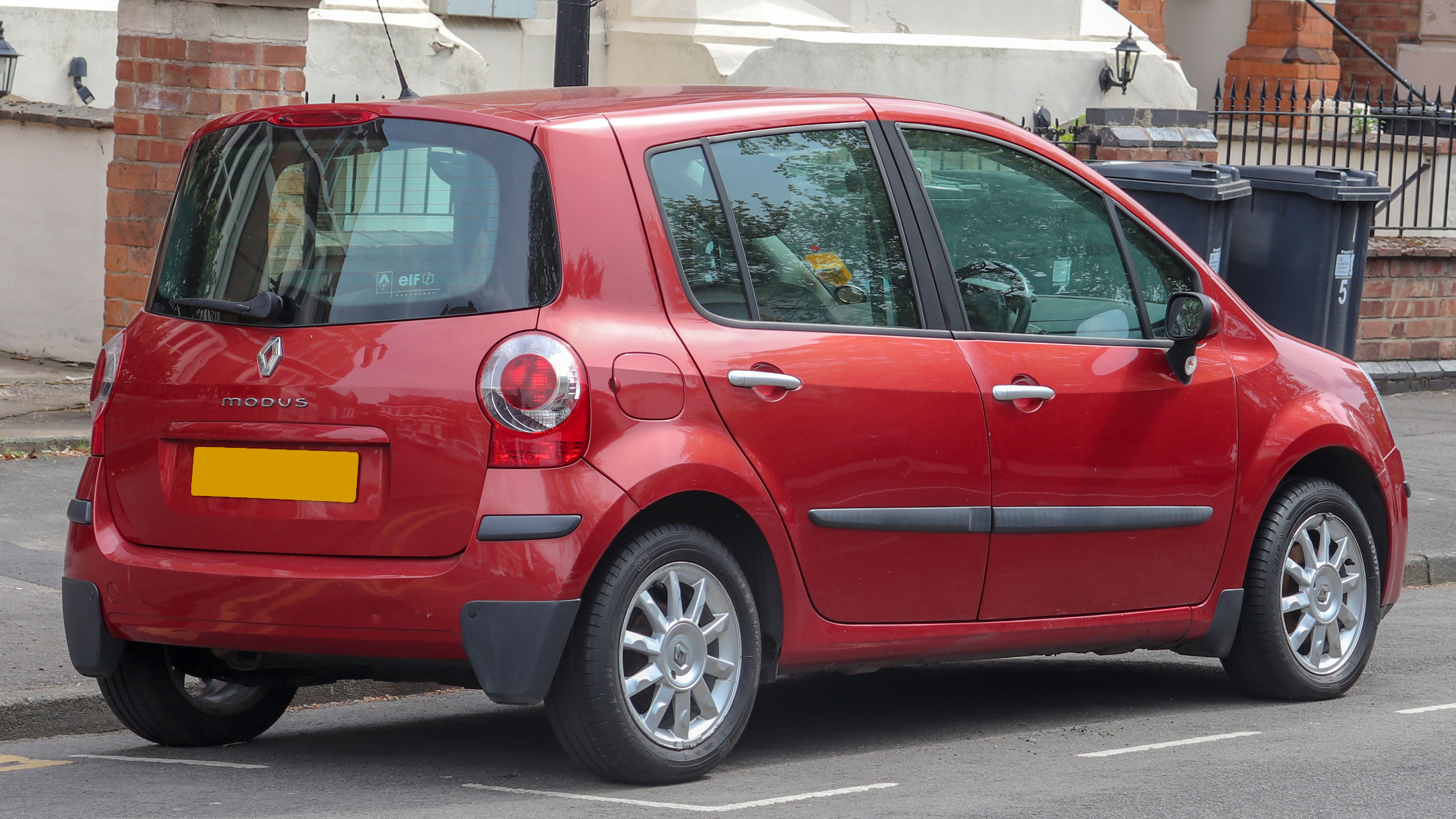
Rear (minor facelift)

Marketed as the Triptic System, the Modus' rear seats are mounted on sliding rails with four preset positions. When in the rearmost two positions the seats are configured for two people with increased leg, hip, and shoulder room. When in the forward positions they are configured for three passengers, increasing cargo capacity.

Another seat-based feature of Modus is the "Stay Put" system. The base of the front passenger seat flips up to reveal a storage compartment. An optional feature of the Modus is a boot chute, a drop-down opening in the centre of the tailgate below the rear window.

The facelifted Modus was launched in Europe in 2007, featuring colour coded bumpers on all versions, clear Perspex 'glass' indicator bezels, revised side door mouldings and updated interior trim on all specification levels.

=== Restyle ===
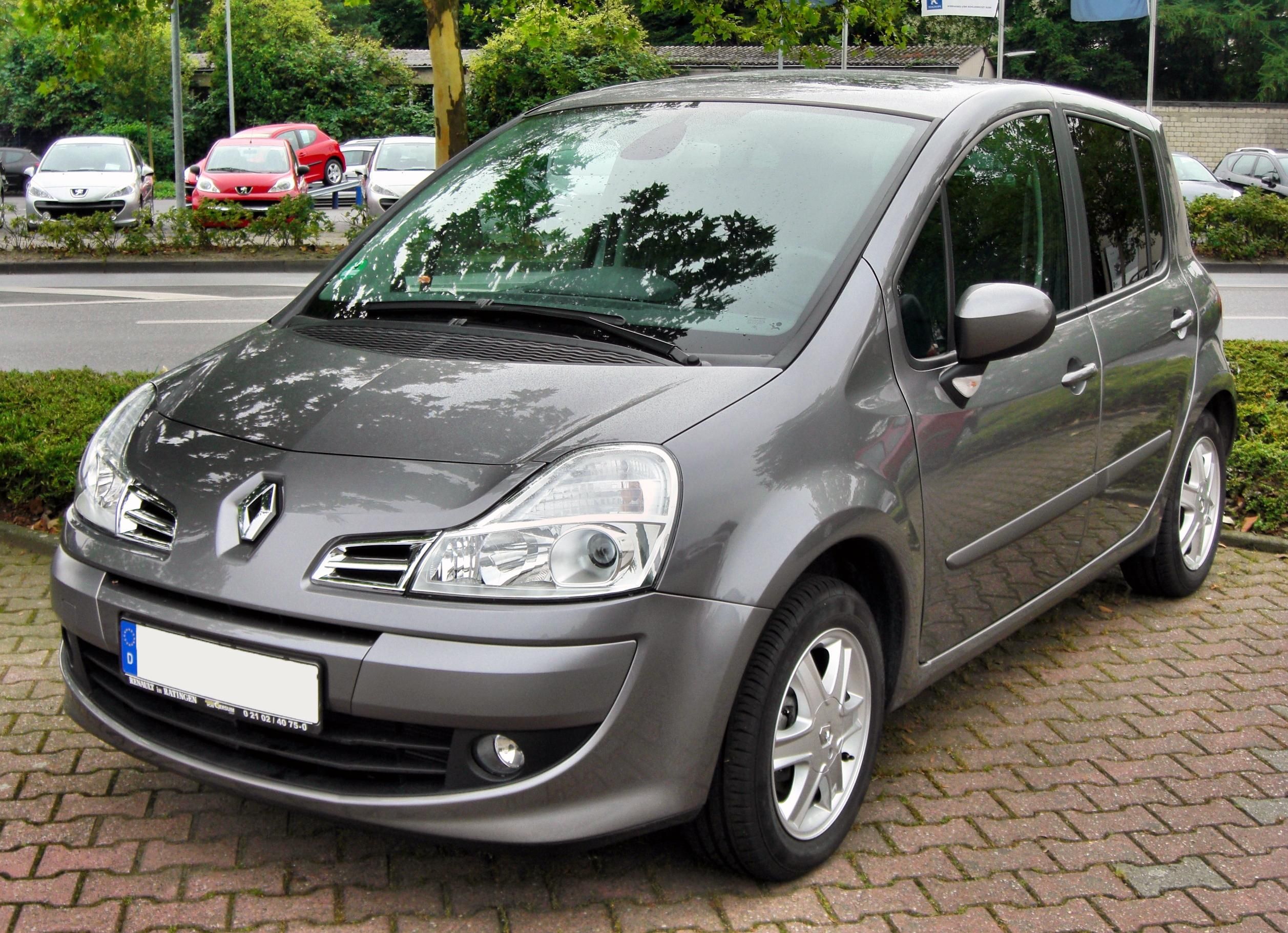
Renault Modus facelift (2007)

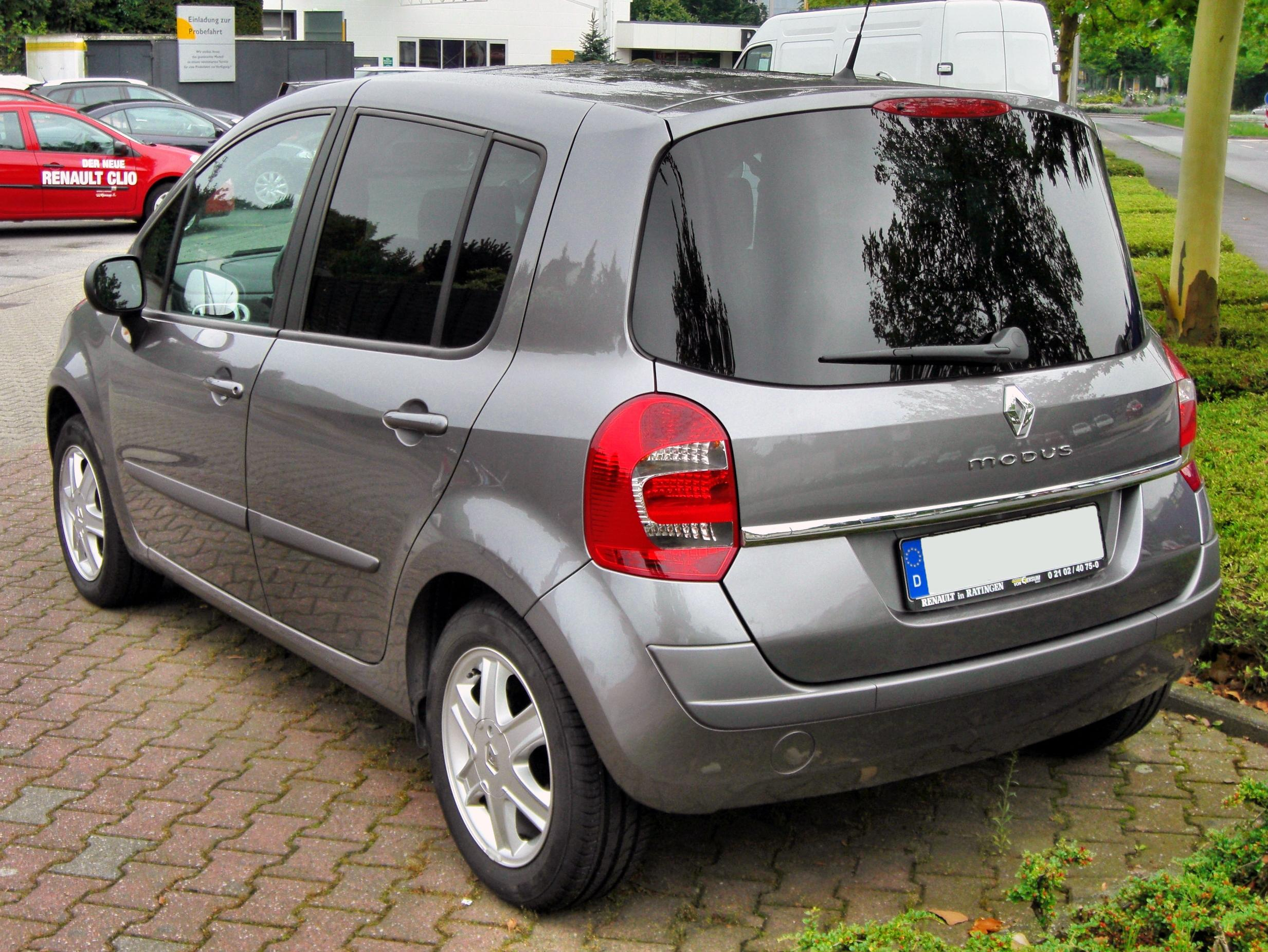
Renault Modus facelift (2007)

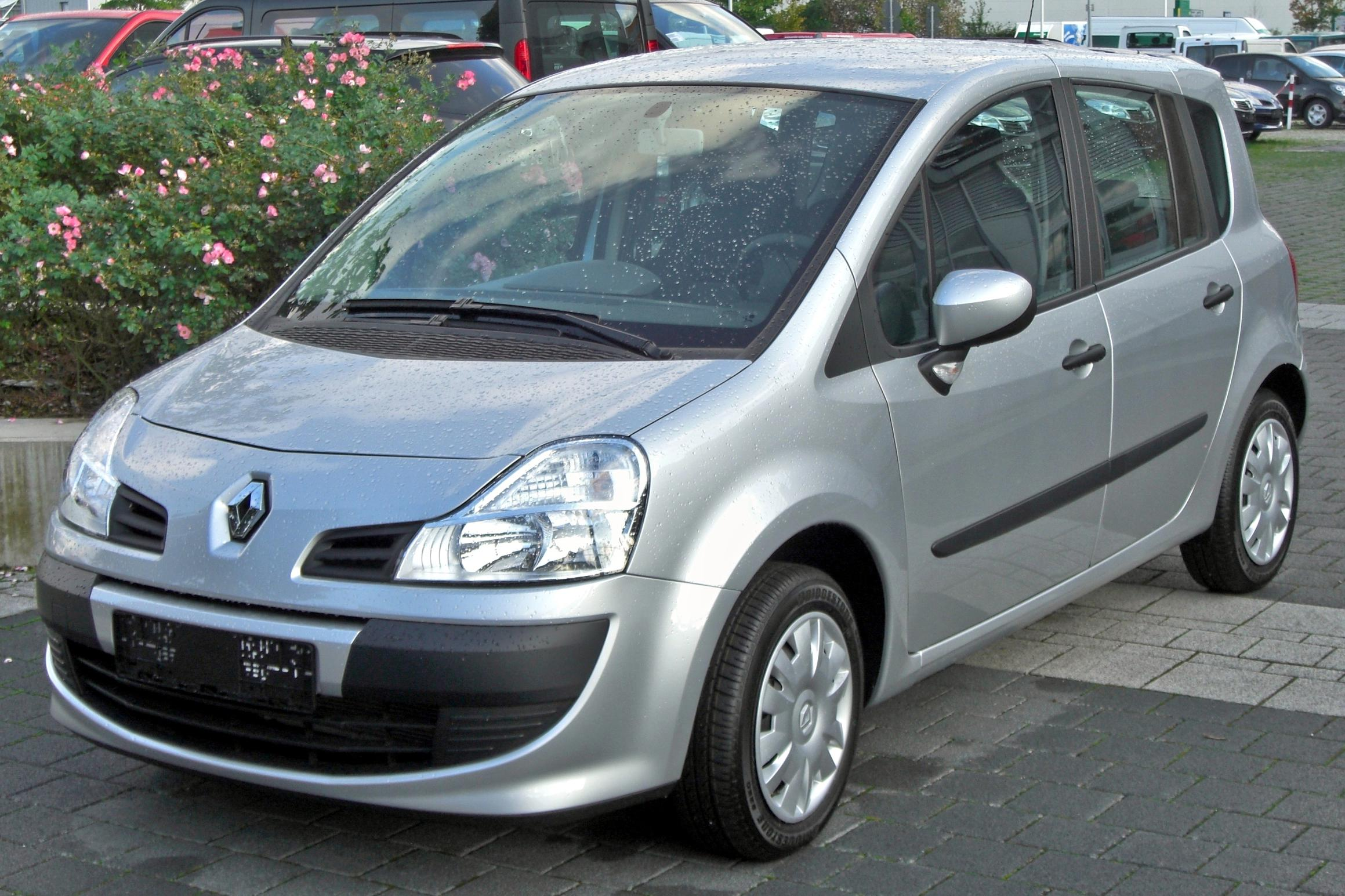
Renault Grand Modus, launched in 2008, has a longer wheelbase than the Modus (front)

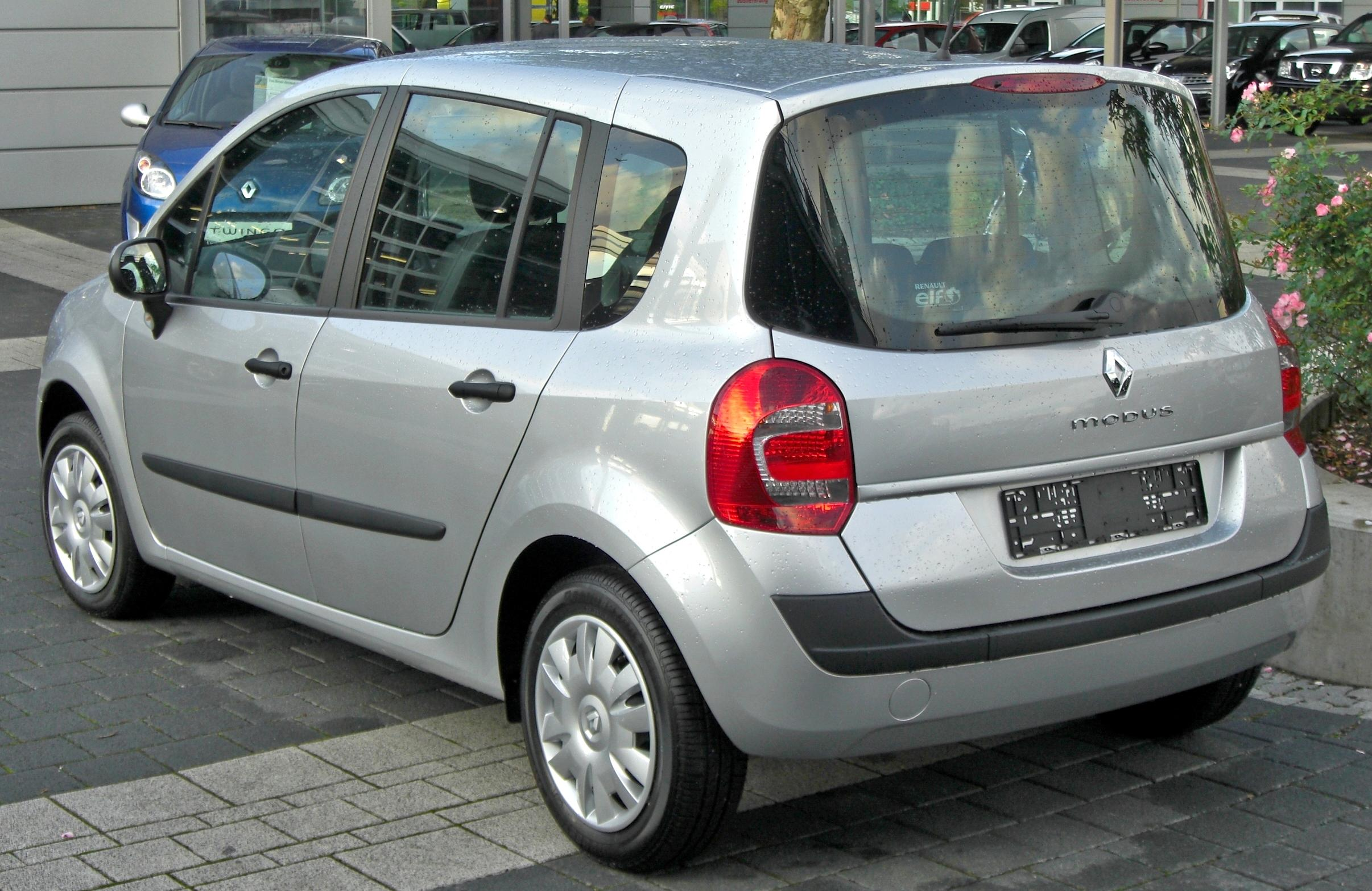
Renault Grand Modus (rear)

Soon after, in February 2008, a restyled Modus and the new Grand Modus were launched. Also that year, the Grand Modus replaced the Modus in Spain. The Grand Modus has an extended length of 4,034 mm (158.8 in) and a boot volume of 410 litres (0.41 m^{3} (0.54 cu yd)) below the parcel shelf.

This restyle saw changes made to the front and rear of the standard model to match the styling of the newer Grand variant. The boot chute has been removed from the options list.

In February 2012, Renault discontinued the Modus, Espace, Kangoo, Laguna, and Wind lines in the United Kingdom.

== Safety ==
The Modus was the first small car to receive the full 5 Euro NCAP stars for passenger safety due in part to its six airbag system, front and rear side impact bars and ISOFIX child seat fixing points. It was also one of the first cars in its class to have such features as automatic headlamps and windscreen wipers on its options list.

The Modus was offered with a cornering lamp function. Concealed in the main headlamp unit and operating at speeds less than 38 mph (61.2 km/h), the lights gave the driver a wider field of vision when going round bends. On Privilège and Initiale models, Renault offered the Modus with "double distance" Xenon headlamps.

== Mechanicals ==
=== Phase I ===
| model | engine type | max. power | /rpm | max. torque | /rpm | top speed | 0–100 km/h (0–62 mph) | mpg | CO_{2} emissions |
|---|---|---|---|---|---|---|---|---|---|
petrol engines all fuel injected
| 1.2 16v | I4 SOHC | 65 PS (48 kW; 64 hp) | 5500 | 105 N⋅m (77 lbf⋅ft) | 4250 | 163 km/h (101 mph) | 15.0 sec | 47.0 | 140 g/km |
| 1.2 16v | I4 SOHC | 75 PS (55 kW; 74 hp) | 5500 | 104 N⋅m (77 lbf⋅ft) | 4250 | 163 km/h (101 mph) | 13.5 sec | 47.0 | 145 g/km |
| 1.4 16v | I4 DOHC | 100 PS (74 kW; 99 hp) | 5700 | 127 N⋅m (94 lbf⋅ft) | 4250 | 177 km/h (110 mph) | 11.4 sec | 42.3 | 161 g/km |
| 1.6 16v | I4 DOHC | 112 PS (82 kW; 110 hp) | 6000 | 151 N⋅m (111 lbf⋅ft) | 4250 | 188 km/h (117 mph) | 10.3 sec | 41.6 | 163 g/km |
| 1.6 16v Auto | I4 DOHC | 112 PS (82 kW; 110 hp) | 6000 | 151 N⋅m (111 lbf⋅ft) | 4250 | 184 km/h (114 mph) | 12.3 sec | 37.8 | 182 g/km |
diesel engines all Direct Injection (dCi)
| 1.5 dCi | I4 SOHC Turbo | 68 PS (50 kW; 67 hp) | 4000 | 160 N⋅m (118 lbf⋅ft) | 2000 | 158 km/h (98 mph) | 15.3 sec | 60.1 | 125 g/km |
| 1.5 dCi | I4 SOHC Turbo | 86 PS (63 kW; 85 hp) | 3750 | 200 N⋅m (148 lbf⋅ft) | 1900 | 171 km/h (106 mph) | 12.6 sec | 62.8 | 119 g/km |
| 1.5 dCi | I4 SOHC Turbo | 106 PS (78 kW; 105 hp) | 4000 | 240 N⋅m (177 lbf⋅ft) | 2000 | 186 km/h (116 mph) | 11.2 sec | 60.1 | 124 g/km |

=== Phase II ===
| model | engine type | max. power | /rpm | max. torque | /rpm | top speed | 0–100 km/h (0–62 mph) | mpg | CO_{2} emissions |
|---|---|---|---|---|---|---|---|---|---|
petrol engines all fuel injected
| 1.2 16v | I4 SOHC | 75 PS (55 kW; 74 hp) | 5500 | 104 N⋅m (77 lb⋅ft) | 4250 | 163 km/h (101 mph) | 13.5 sec | 47.9 | 138 g/km |
| 1.2 16v QS5* | I4 SOHC | 75 PS (55 kW; 74 hp) | 5500 | 104 N⋅m (77 lb⋅ft) | 4250 | 169 km/h (105 mph) | 15.0 sec | 50.4 | 134 g/km |
| 1.2 TCe | I4 SOHC Turbo | 100 PS (74 kW; 99 hp) | 5500 | 145 N⋅m (107 lb⋅ft) | 3000 | 182 km/h (113 mph) | 11.2 sec | 47.1 | 139 g/km |
| 1.6 16v Auto | I4 DOHC | 113 PS (83 kW; 111 hp) | 6000 | 151 N⋅m (111 lb⋅ft) | 4250 | 183 km/h (114 mph) | 12.3 sec | 36.7 | 179 g/km |
diesel engines all Direct Injection (dCi)
| 1.5 dCi | I4 SOHC Turbo | 88 PS (65 kW; 87 hp) | 4000 | 200 N⋅m (148 lb⋅ft) | 1750 | 171 km/h (106 mph) | 13.0 sec | 62.8 | 107 g/km |
| 1.5 dCi QS5* | I4 SOHC Turbo | 88 PS (65 kW; 87 hp) | 4000 | 200 N⋅m (148 lb⋅ft) | 1750 | 171 km/h (106 mph) | 14.8 sec | 62.8 | 119 g/km |

- QS5 = QuickShift5

In terms of reliability, according to the 2006 breakdown survey from the German Automobile Club, the Modus ranks 3rd in its class with an average 5.8 breakdowns per 1,000 vehicles after three years. This is behind the Audi A2 (1st) and the BMW Mini (2nd) and ahead of the Lupo (4th) & Polo (5th), Toyota Yaris (6th) and Honda Jazz (7th).

== See also ==
- Renault Scénic, the compact MPV of the manufacturer
- Renault Espace, the large MPV of the manufacturer
