= Lada Largus =

Compact station wagon/panel van produced by Lada

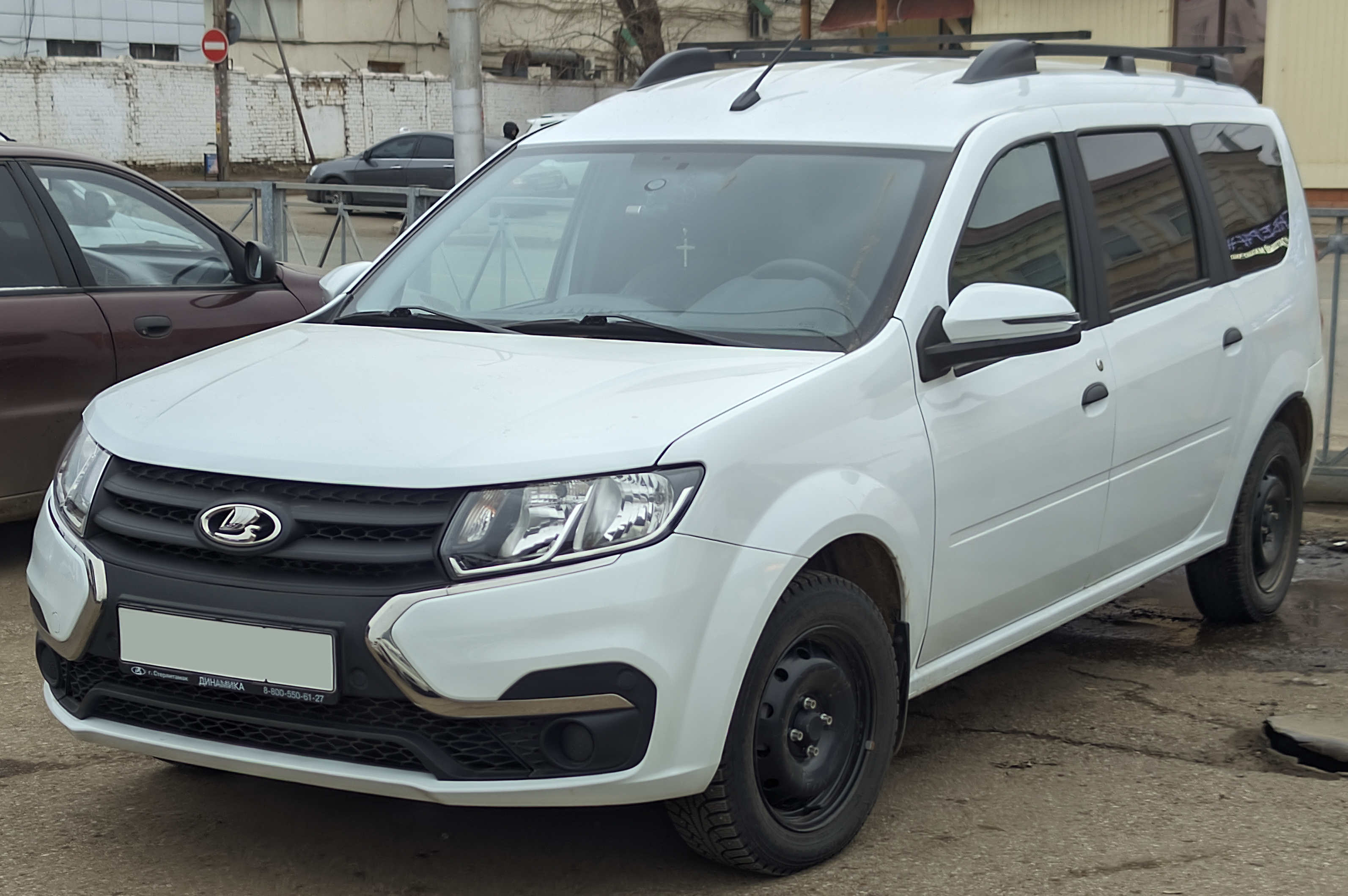
- Lada Largus Cross (facelift)

Overview
- Manufacturer: Lada (AvtoVAZ)
- Also called: Dacia Logan MCV; Renault Logan MCV
- Production: 2012 – present
- Assembly: Russia: Tolyatti

Body and chassis
- Class: Compact MPV
- Body style: 5-door station wagon 5-door panel van
- Layout: Front-engine, front-wheel-drive
- Platform: Dacia B0 platform

Powertrain
- Engine: 1.6 L Renault K4M SOHC/DOHC 8v/16v I4 (petrol)
- Electric motor: Permanent Magnet motor (e-Largus)
- Transmission: 5-speed manual

Dimensions
- Wheelbase: 2,905 mm (114.4 in)
- Length: 4,470 mm (176.0 in)
- Width: 1,750 mm (68.9 in)
- Height: 1,636 mm (64.4 in)
- Curb weight: 1,260 kg (2,778 lb)

Chronology
- Predecessor: VAZ-2104

The Lada Largus is a compact estate car built by the Russian manufacturer AvtoVAZ for Russia and CIS countries since 2012. It is essentially a rebadged version of the Renault-developed first generation Dacia Logan MCV and was originally produced as a joint project with Renault and Nissan, but is now just produced by Lada since 2012.

== Overview ==
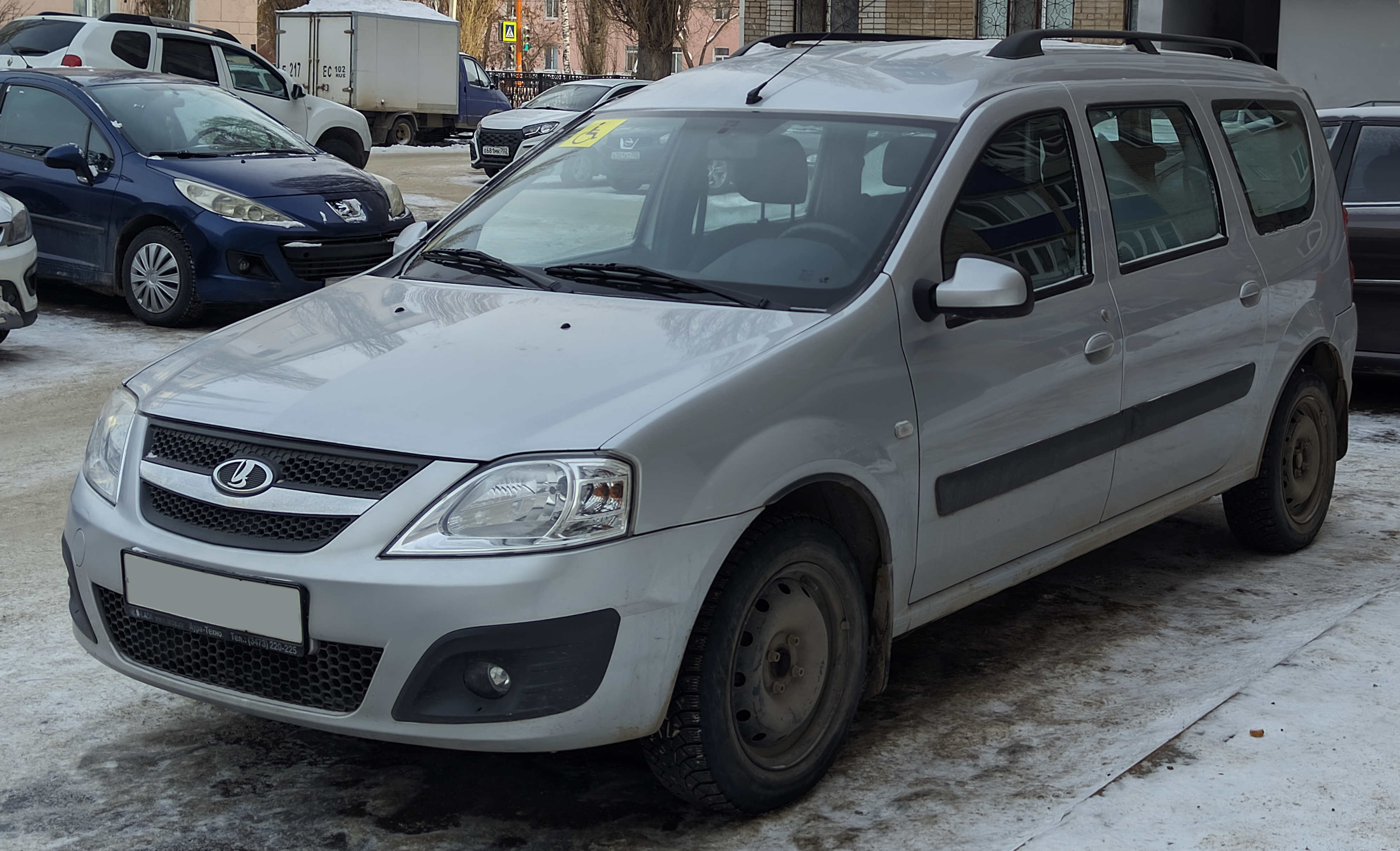
Lada Largus R90 (pre-facelift)

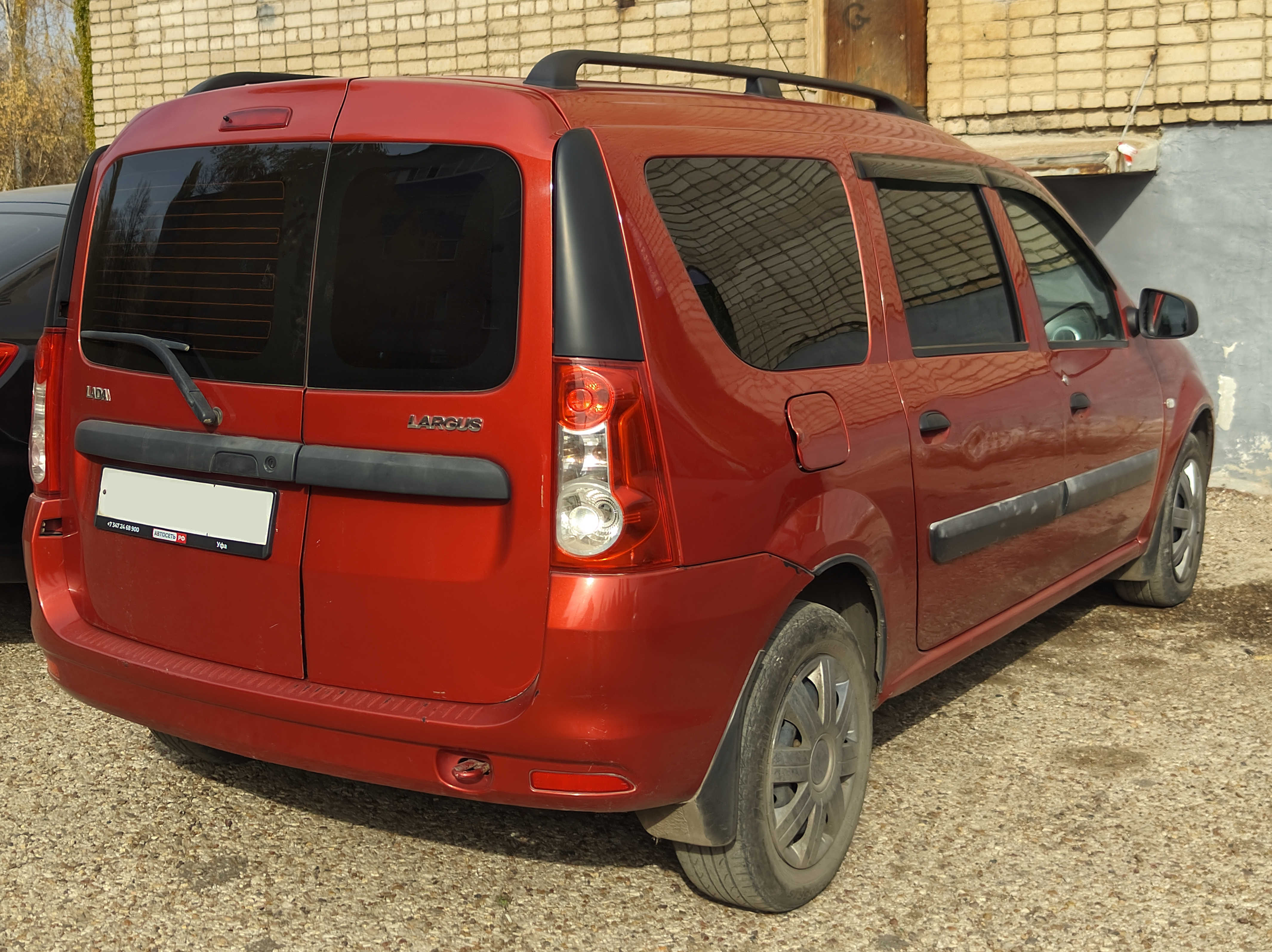
rear view (pre-facelift)

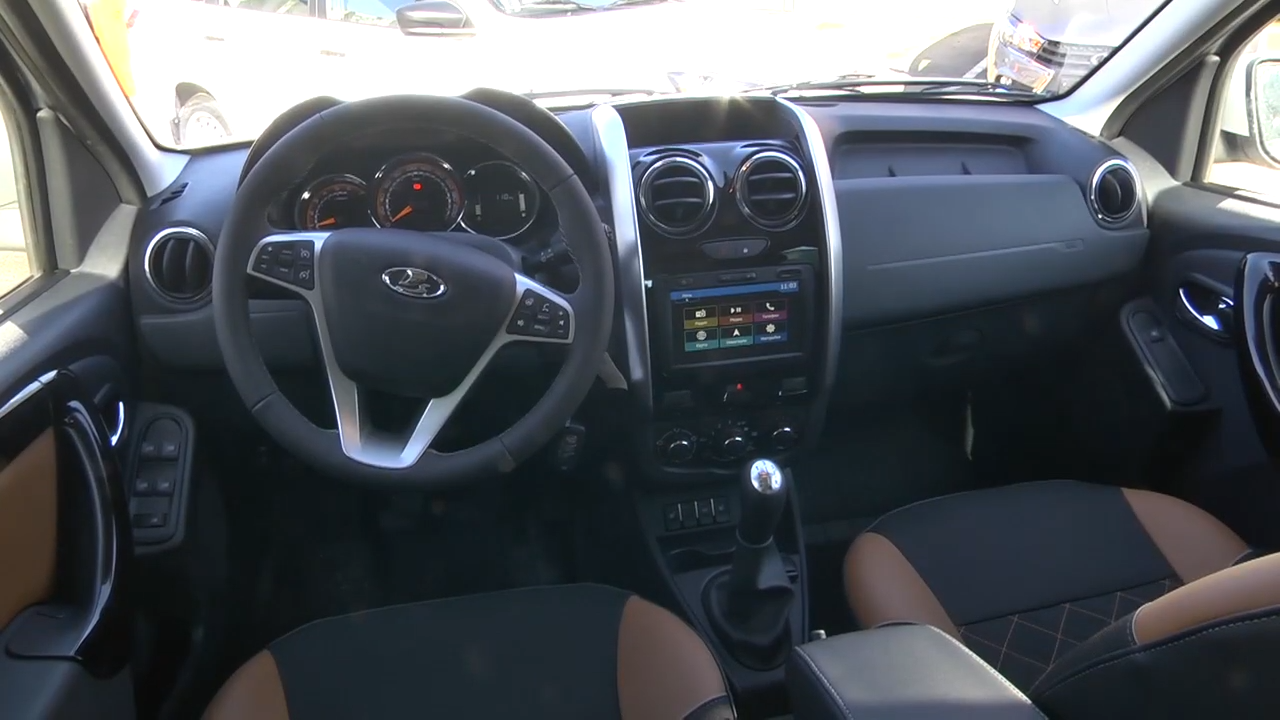
Interior view

After the VAZ-2104 had been removed from production in 2012, AvtoVAZ no longer produced any inexpensive and roomy station wagon models. The present model line station wagons Lada Kalina and Lada Priora have a higher completion and much higher price. The Largus is the first joint project between AvtoVAZ and Renault-Nissan (with an investment of $550 million). It is part of a larger common plan of the companies to produce five models in Russia, based on the Dacia B0 platform. The total production in 2012 is expected to reach 27,000 cars (mostly Largus).

The Largus is being produced in a full-cycle production unit. It is equipped with air conditioning, an anti-lock braking system, two front airbags, 5 or 7 seats, bluetooth hands free and an MP3 player. It is available in two versions: as a passenger MPV and as a high-capacity panel van. Both versions are available with either of the two petrol engine options: a 1.6-litre 8-valve with 84 hp (62 kW) or a 1.6-litre 16 valve, capable of producing 105 hp (77 kW). Both engines are paired with a five-speed manual gearbox. The only significant changes from the original model are the grille, front bumper, lining the quarter panel and the headlights.

On 4 April 2012, AvtoVAZ launched Lada Largus production at a ceremony attended by Vladimir Putin. During his visit to Tolyatti, Putin toured the plant and signed the first Lada Largus. Sales were started on 16 July 2012. The panel van version went on sale in August 2012 and the Cross version was launched in 2015.

=== Facelift ===
In 2021, an updated Largus was introduced in two passenger versions called the Universal and the Cross, while the van version was renamed the Furgon. The 8-valve and 16-valve versions of the 1.6-litre engine remained, with a slight increase of power, now producing 90 and 106 hp (66 and 78 kW), respectively.

== Versions ==
=== Largus R90 / Largus Universal ===
The passenger station wagon is offered in 5- and 7-seater configurations. The volume of the trunk in the five -seater version of Largus is 560 litres. In a seven -seater car, it is only 135 litres.

It was renamed as the Largus Universal with the facelifted model in 2021.

=== Largus F90 / Largus Furgon ===
The Largus F90 is the cargo van variant with solid metal rear and side panels.

Like the R90 variant, it was renamed as the Largus Furgon in 2021.

=== Largus 'XV / Largus Cross ===
Originally known as the Lada Largus 'XV, like the Largus R90, it is available in 5 and 7-seater options.

In 2016, in honor of his 50th anniversary, AvtoVAZ presented Largus Cross Black Edition. It differs from the regular Cross by having black wheels, roof and side mirrors.

It was renamed as the Largus Cross in 2021.

=== Largus CNG ===
The CNG version began production in January 2019. In 2021, the issue was temporarily suspended.

=== e-Largus ===
In December 2022, the experimental production of the electric version of Lada Largus began in Izhevsk. It is planned that the e-Largus model will be produced in both a passenger version and a commercial van version. The share of using components in LADA e-Largus from Russian manufacturers is 50%. The electric motor with a capacity of 110 kW (150 hp) can drive the e-Largus up to 145 km/h. Battery capacity is 60 kW.

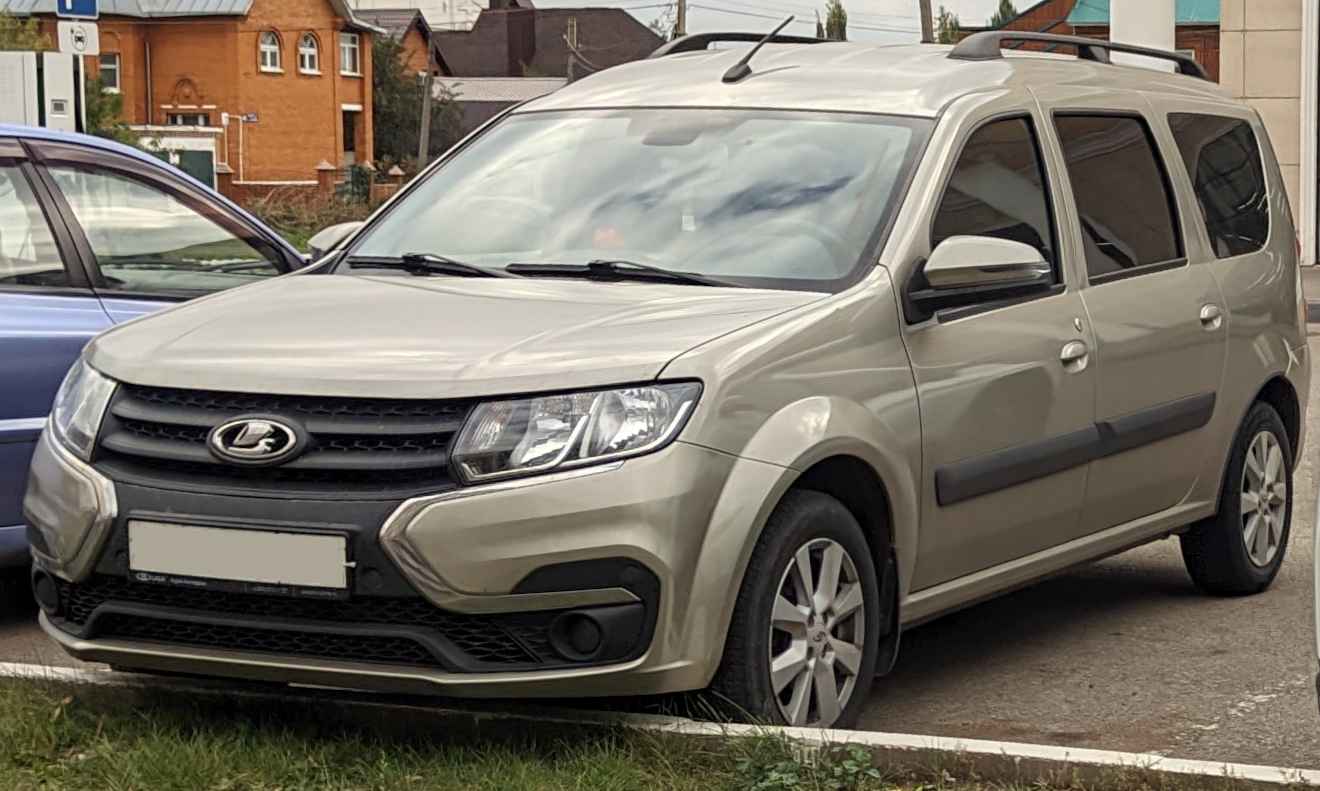
Lada Largus R90 (facelift)

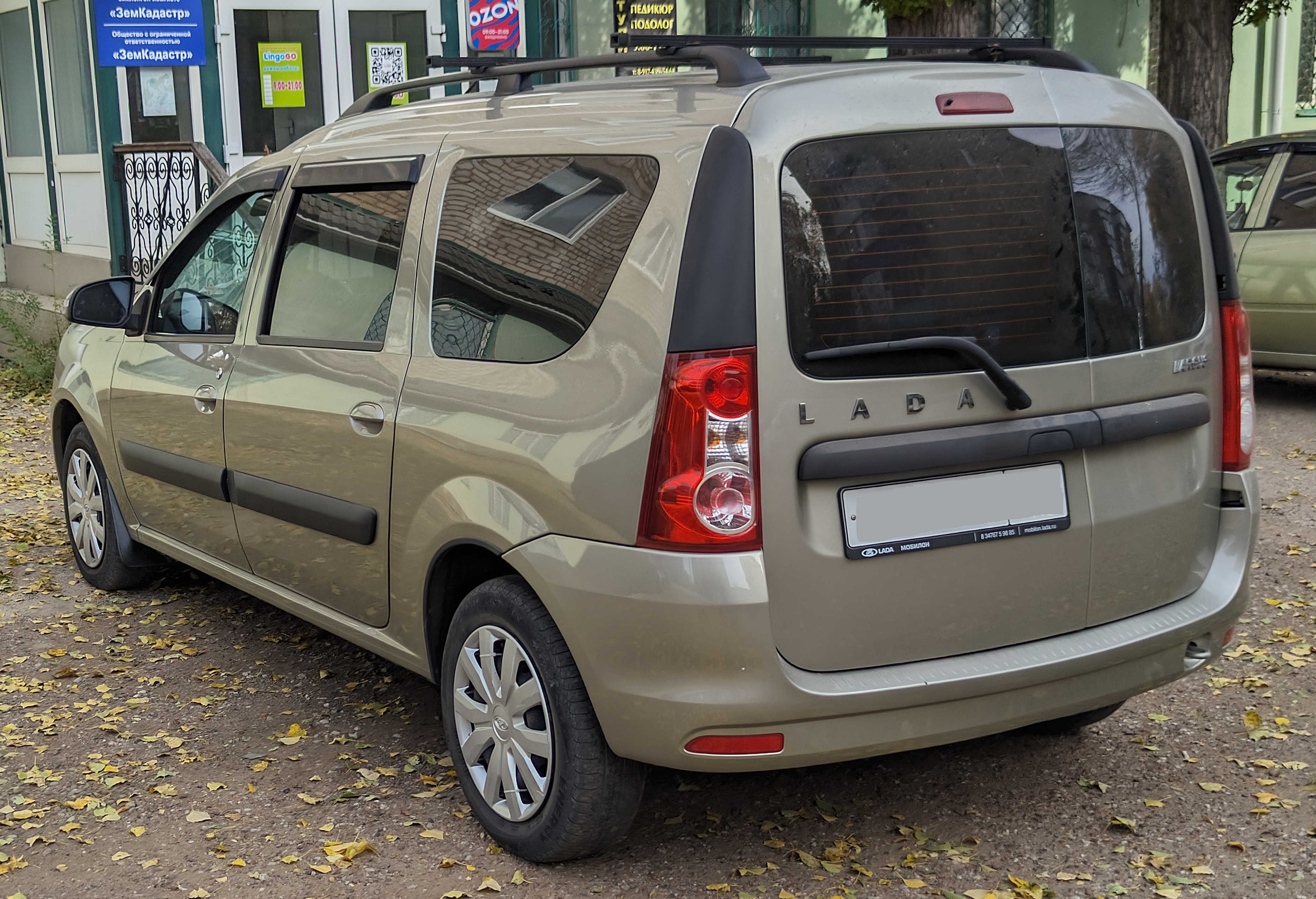
rear view (facelift)

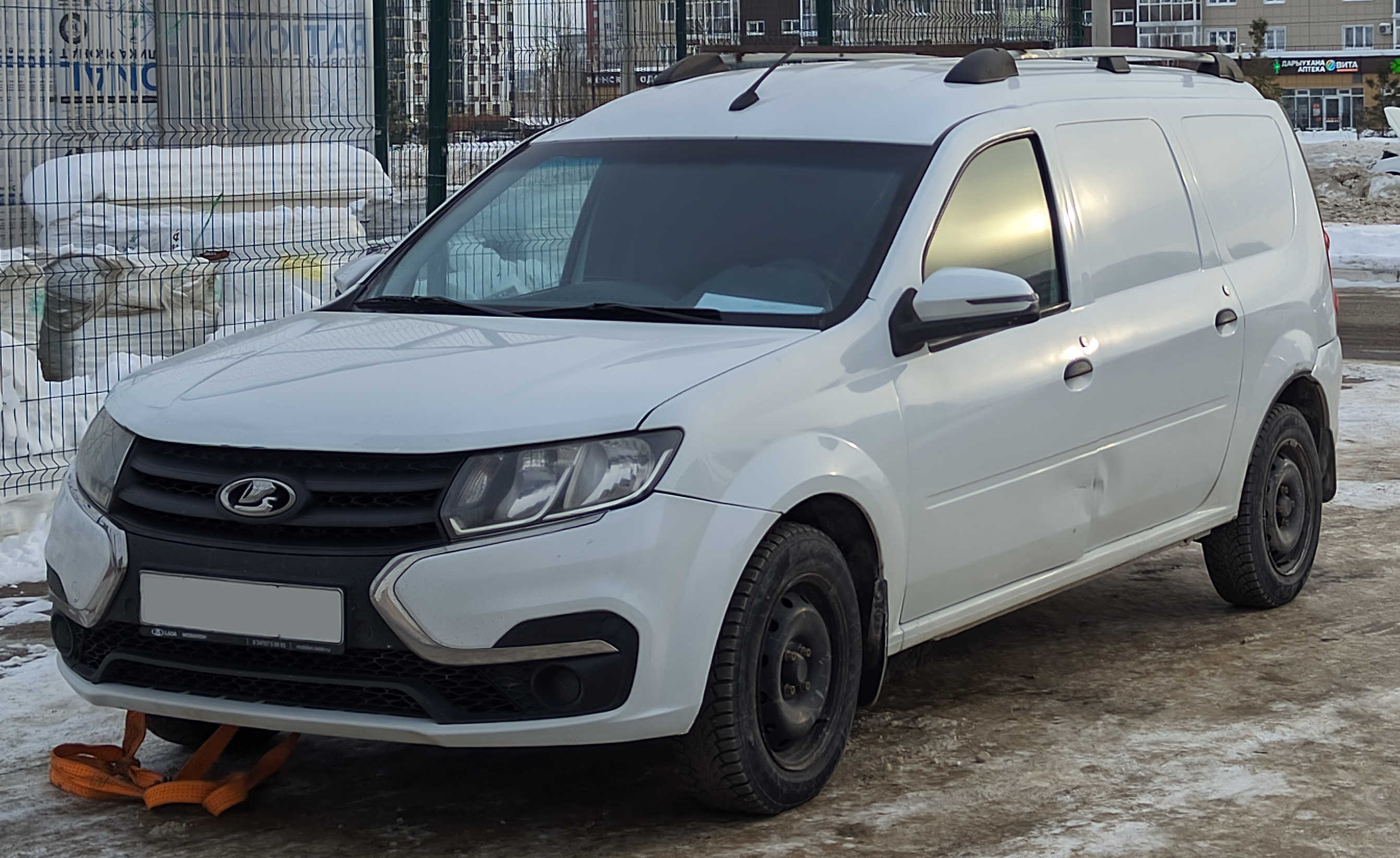
Lada Largus F90 (facelift)

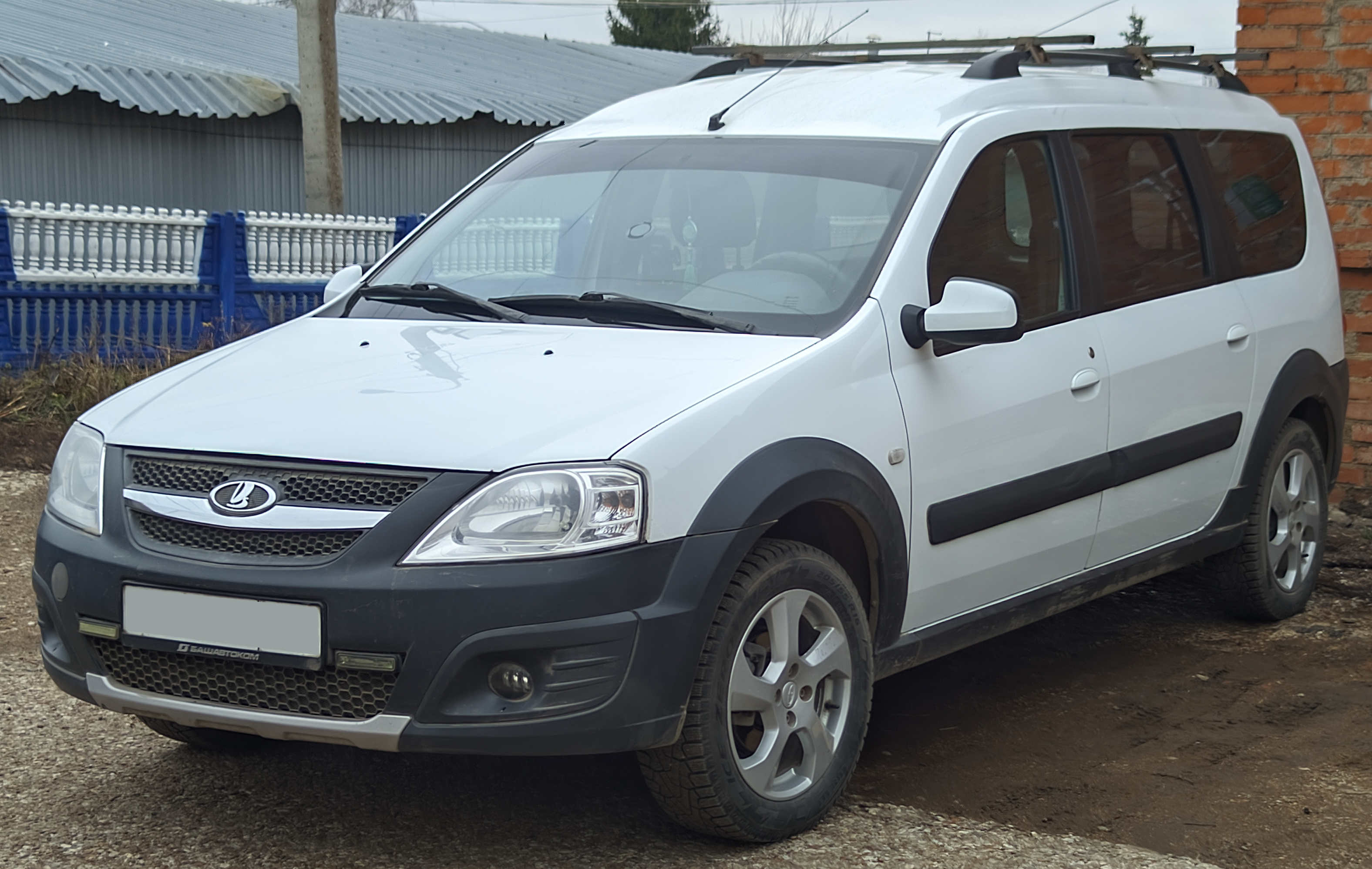
Lada Largus Cross (pre-facelift)

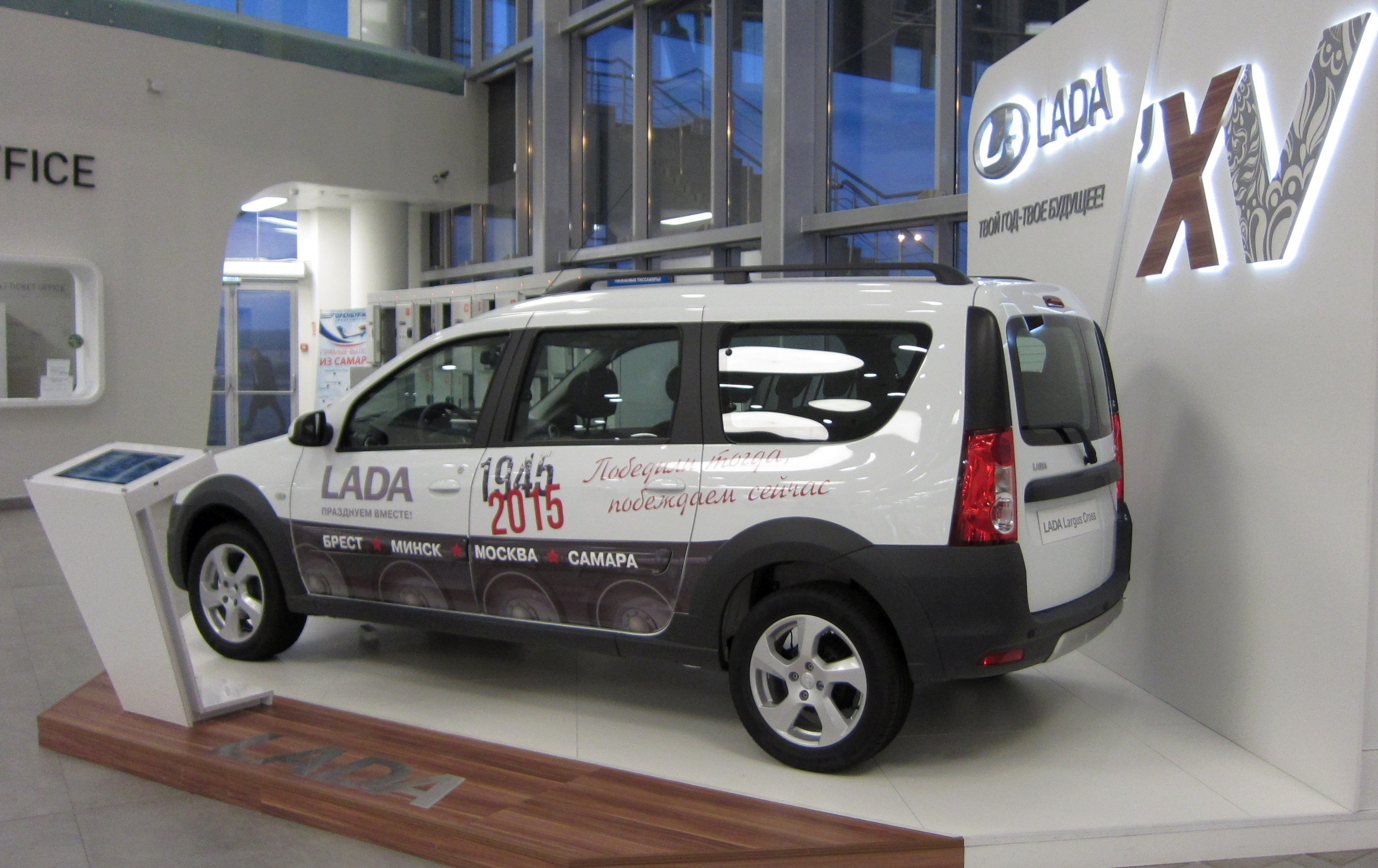
Rear view of a pre-facelifted Lada 'XV at the Kurumoch International Airport

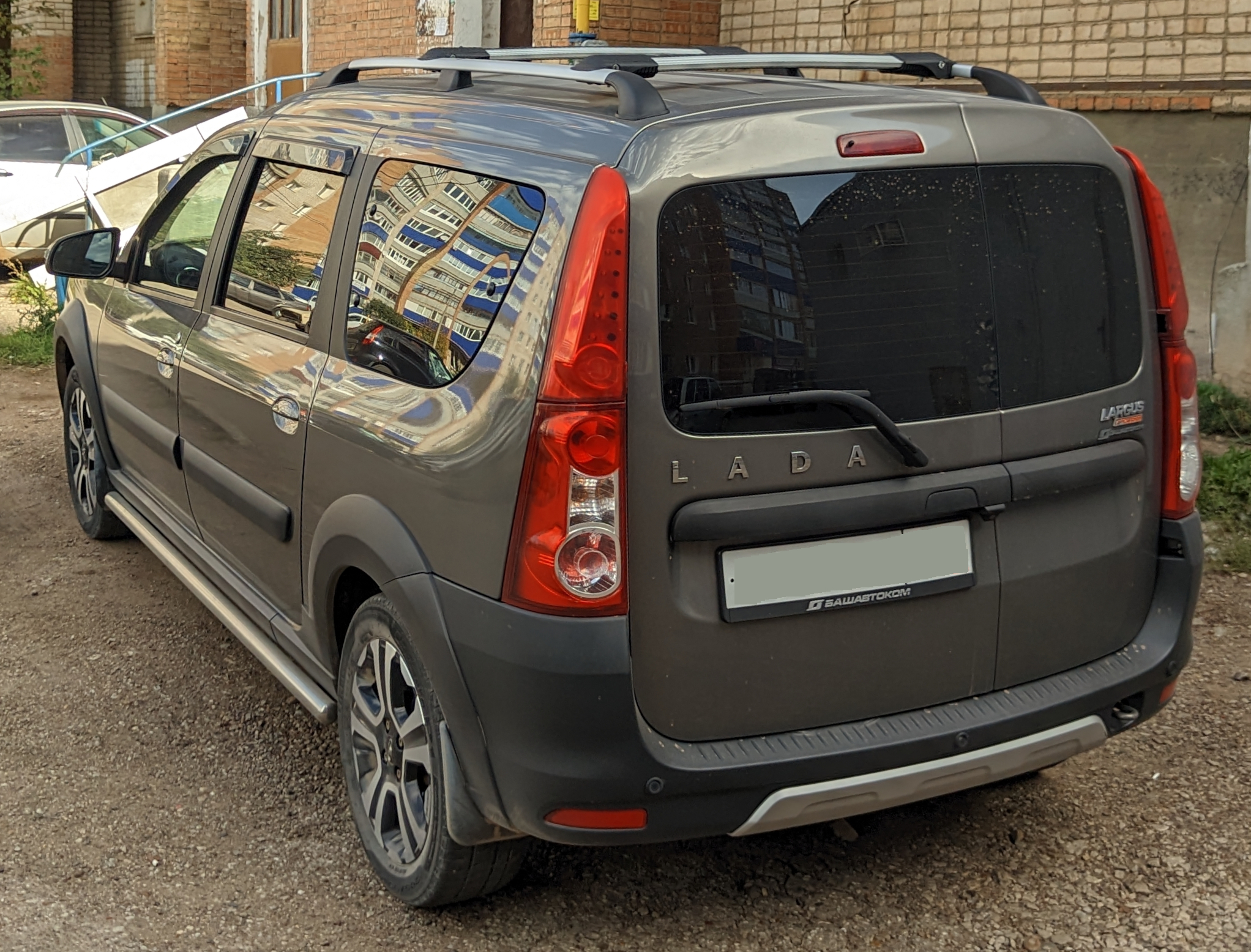
Lada Largus Cross (facelift; rear view)

== Special variants ==
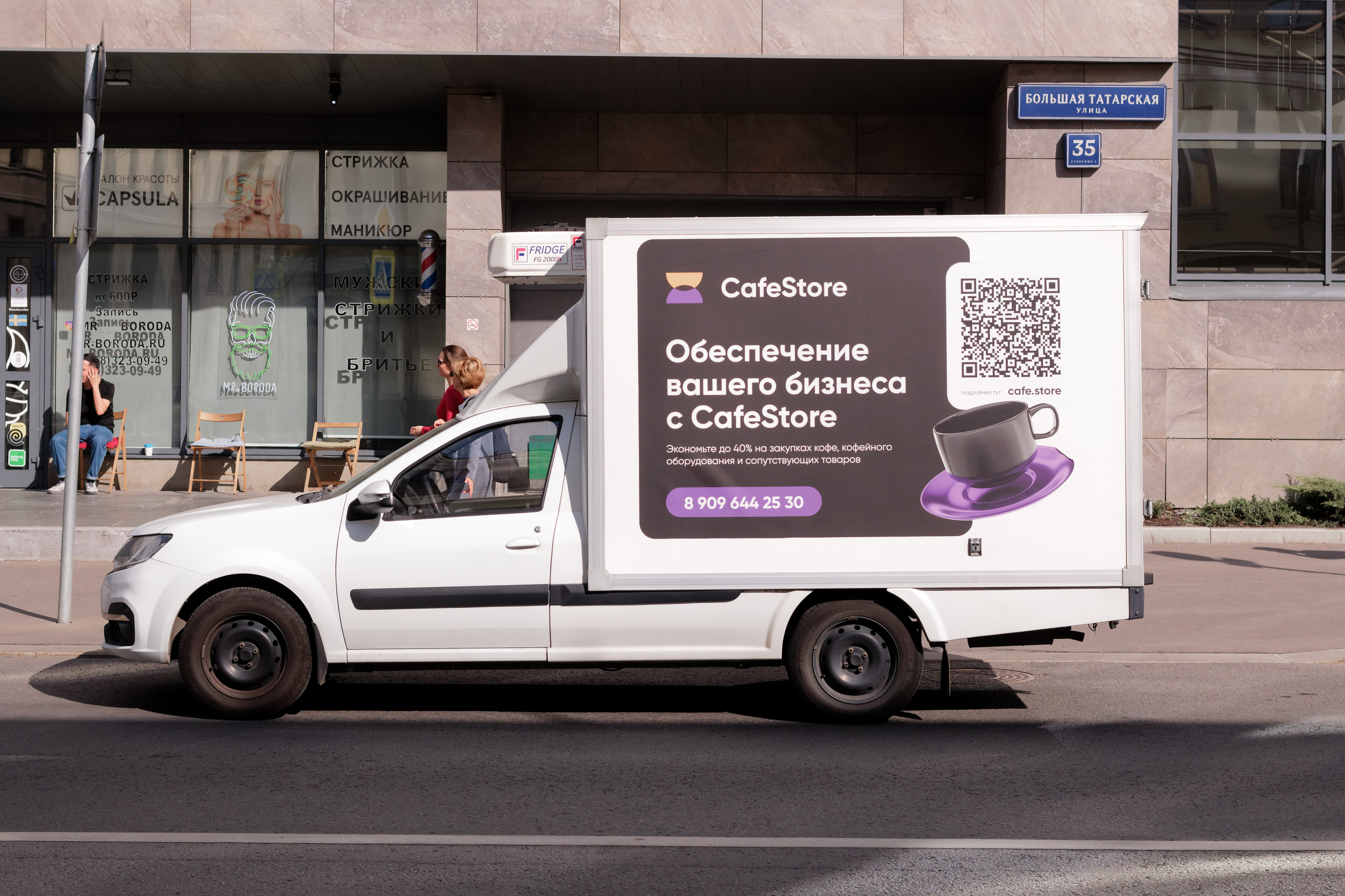
Lada Largus Prima box van.

Lada sells Special Models such as wheelchair vans or various special bodies (cargo trucks, refrigerated vans, workshop vehicles, medical services (non-emergency stretcher transport (ambulette) and ambulance versions), taxis and social taxis based on the Largus.

== See also ==
- Dacia Logan
