= Qpod =

European on- and off-road vehicle

The Qpod is an off- and on-road vehicle and is a UK brand of the French company owned SECMA. Created in 1995 by Daniel Renard, the Qpod brand was introduced into the UK by TV personality Noel Edmonds in 2004 and marketed by the Unique Motor Company.

There are currently six models of vehicle available. QT, a more "sporty" sister brand, has two additional models.

The Qpod City (the 50cc model) also appeared in the 1998 Jackie Chan feature film Who Am I? in the final chase scene.

According to the "Company Check" website, the Unique Car Company ceased active trading on the 31st of August 2006 and is now dissolved.
