= SECMA =

French automotive manufacturer

- Industry: Automotive
- Founded: 1995
- Founder: Daniel Renard
- Headquarters: Aniche, France
- Key people: Daniel Renard (CEO)
- Products: Roadsters and Buggys
- Website: www.secma-performance.fr

SECMA (Société d'Etude et de Construction de Mecanique Automobile) is a French automobile manufacturer located in Aniche, France.

== History ==
The company was founded by Daniel Renard in 1995. His first microcar business was Automobiles ERAD, founded in 1975.

The design of the first Secma model in 1995 responded to Daniel Renard's desire to create the simplest possible car, for less than 20,000 F at the time (3,000 euros).

On 27 May 2009, SECMA's factory was destroyed by fire. The company then moved into new, more modern and functional facilities. In parallel with the production of its flagship model, the Secma F16, in 2012 the Secma Fun Lander was launched. By 2014, around 30,000 Secma and ERAD vehicles had been manufactured - averaging out at about 750 per year since the beginning.

At the 2016 Geneva Motor Show, the Secma F16 Turbo was unveiled. One year after, Secma launched the Fun Buggy, a model with more ground clearance and a Buggy look.

== Models ==
- 1995 – 2018: Fun Tech 340 / Fun Quad 340
- 1995 – 2018: Fun Elec’
- 1995 – 2018: Fun Buggy 340cc
- 1995 – 2018: 6x4
- 1995 – 2018: Fun Extr’m 500 / F440 DCI
- 1995 – 2018: Fun Runner
- 1995 – 2018: Fun Family
- 2008 – present: F16
- 2016 – present: F16 Turbo
- 2017 – present: Fun Buggy
- 2022 – present: F16 Turbo GT
- 2026 – present: F16 Retro
- 1995: Qpod
