= Mahindra Verito Vibe =

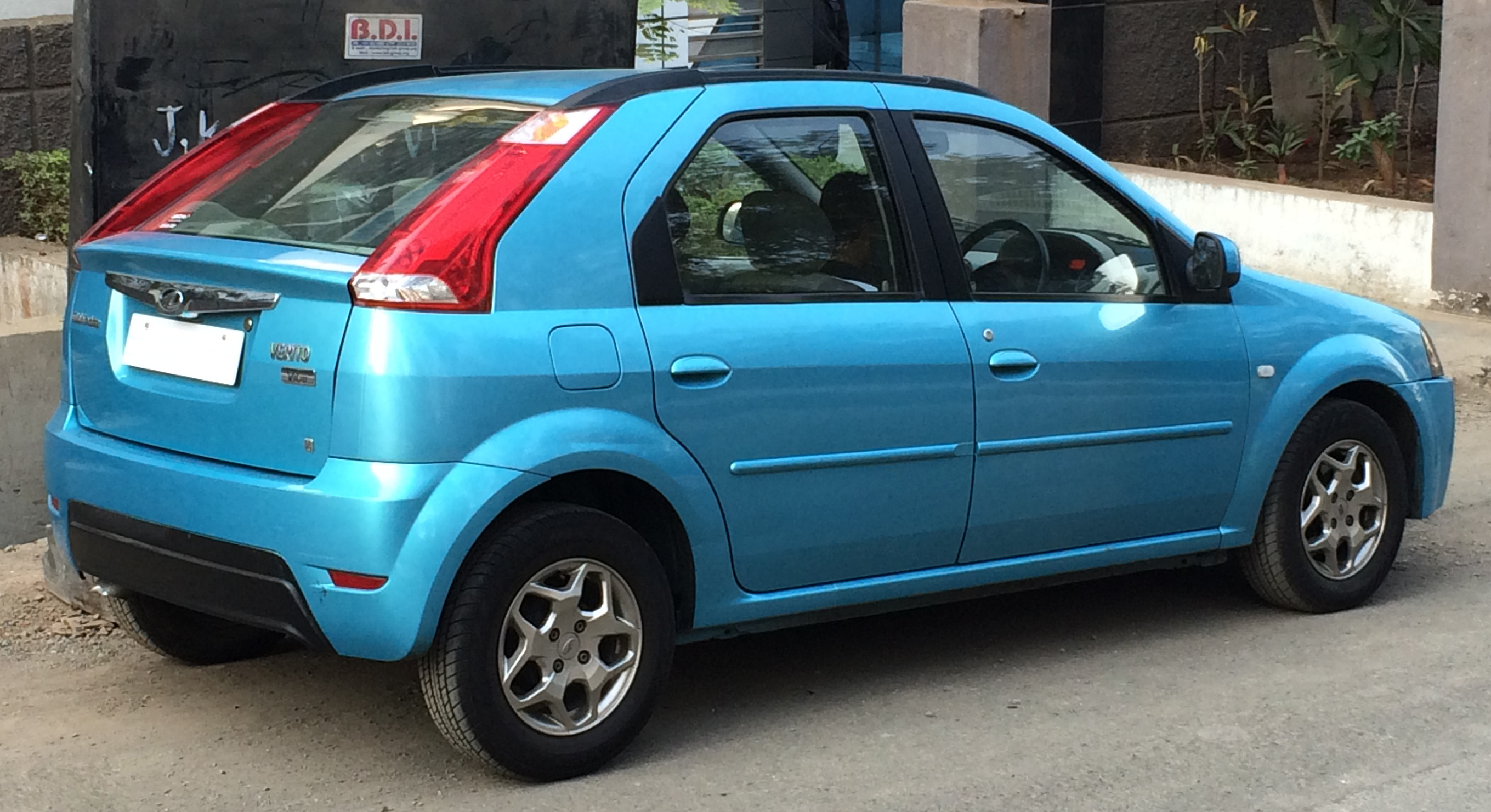

Overview
- Manufacturer: Mahindra & Mahindra
- Production: 2013–2019
- Assembly: India: Nashik

Body and chassis
- Class: Subcompact car
- Body style: 4-door notchback sedan
- Layout: Front-engine, front-wheel-drive
- Platform: Dacia B0 platform
- Doors: 4
- Related: Dacia Logan; Renault Clio

Powertrain
- Engine: 1.5 L K9K I4 (diesel)
- Transmission: 5-speed manual

Dimensions
- Wheelbase: 2,630 mm (103.5 in)
- Length: 3,991 mm (157.1 in)
- Width: 1,740 mm (68.5 in)
- Height: 1,540 mm (60.6 in)
- Curb weight: 1,155 kg (2,546 lb)

The Mahindra Verito Vibe was a subcompact notchback car made for the Indian market. It was developed as a variation of the Dacia Logan and introduced as a subcompact notchback for the Indian market in order to offer a hatchback-like car in a smaller size.

The Mahindra Verito Vibe is the notchback version of the Mahindra Verito, which was a sedan and is also a discontinued model of Mahindra & Mahindra; this model appeared before the sedan version.

== History ==
The Mahindra Verito Vibe was launched in 2013 to get the tax benefits offered to cars with a length below 4 metres (13 ft). The car was a converted Mahindra Verito sedan (based on first generation of the Dacia Logan) into a sub 4-meter notchback.
