= Renault K-Type engine =

K-Type engine
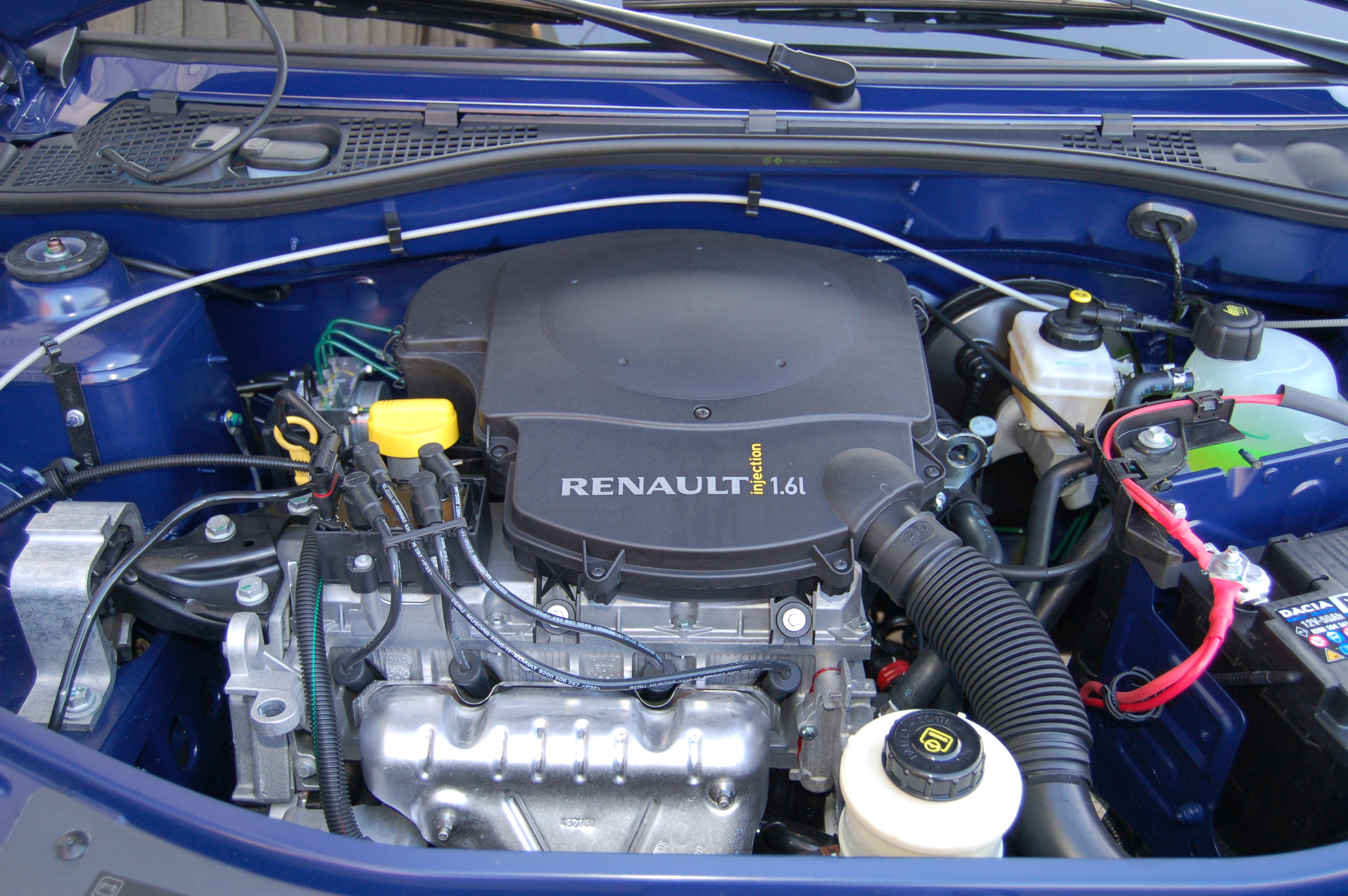

Overview
- Manufacturer: Renault
- Production: 1995–present

Layout
- Configuration: Inline-4
- Displacement: 1.4 L (1,390 cc); 1.5 L (1,461 cc); 1.6 L (1,598 cc)
- Cylinder bore: 79.5 mm (3.13 in); 76 mm (2.99 in)
- Piston stroke: 70 mm (2.76 in); 80.5 mm (3.17 in)
- Cylinder block material: Cast iron
- Cylinder head material: Aluminium
- Valvetrain: SOHC 2 or DOHC 4 valves x cyl.

RPM range
- Idle speed: 850 rpm
- Max. engine speed: Petrol: 6000–7000 rpm Diesel: 4500–5000 rpm

Combustion
- Turbocharger: BorgWarner Variable-geometry (on some versions)
- Fuel system: Multi-point fuel injection Common rail Direct injection
- Fuel type: Petrol, Diesel
- Cooling system: Water-cooled

Output
- Power output: 55–99 kW (75–135 PS; 74–133 hp)
- Torque output: 160–260 N⋅m (118–192 lb⋅ft)

Chronology
- Predecessor: Renault Energy engine

The K-Type is a family of inline-4 automobile engines developed and produced by Renault since 1995. This is an internal combustion engine, four-stroke, with 4 cylinders in line bored directly into the iron block, water cooled, with overhead camshaft(s) driven by a toothed timing belt and an aluminium cylinder head. This engine is available in petrol and diesel versions, with 8 or 16 valves.

== History ==
The K-Type engine is an evolution of the Energy engine, itself derived from the Cléon-Fonte engine in which a hemispherical head incorporating a camshaft driven by a toothed timing belt was fitted. The K-Type engine is the ultimate evolution of the Cléon-Fonte engine. The main modification of the K-Type engine is the use of non-removable cylinder liners. The first K-Type appeared on the Mégane with a capacity of 1.6 L (1,598 cc).

== Evolution ==
=== Gasoline versions ===
In 1998, a 16-valve derivative of the K7M engine appeared in the Renault Laguna Phase 2, named the K4M. This new engine replaced the 1.8 litre F-Type engine fitted to the Laguna Phase 1.

The specificity of K4J and K4M engines is that they have a 16-valve cylinder head, similar to the F4P and F4R versions of F-Type engine, over the K4J and K4M engines share the same distribution kit and even water pump that the F-Type engine 16 valves (F4P and F4R).

=== Diesel versions ===
The K9K engine - diesel version with 1.5 L (1,461 cc) - appeared on the Clio 2 Phase 2, to replace the 1.9 D ("F-Type engine"). This engine is equipped with high-pressure direct injection common-rail.

== KxJ petrol engine ==
The KxJ displaces 1.4 L (1,390 cc). It is an evolution from Renault Energy ExJ.

Technical specifications
Displacement	1.4 L (1,390 cc)
Bore x Stroke	79.5 mm × 70 mm (3.13 in × 2.76 in)
Total number of valves	8/16
Compression ratio	9.5:1 / 10:1
Max. power	55 kW (75 PS; 74 hp) / 72 kW (98 PS; 97 hp)
Type of fuel injection	MPi
Fuel type	petrol
Catalytic converter	present
Oil capacity	3.5 L (3.7 US qt; 3.1 imp qt)
Recommended engine oil	5w30

=== Applications (K7J 8v) ===
Engine code	Power	Year(s)	Car(s)
K7J 700	55 kW (75 PS; 74 hp) 5500 rpm	1997–2003; 2001–2003; 1999–2006	Renault Clio; Renault Kangoo; Renault Symbol
K7J 710	55 kW (75 PS; 74 hp) 5500 rpm	2000-2003 2003-2005 2004–2010; 2008–2010	Dacia SupeRnova Dacia Solenza Dacia Logan Dacia Sandero
K7J 714 (LPG E4)	55 kW (75 PS; 74 hp) 5500 rpm	2007–2010; 2008–2010	Dacia SupeRnova Dacia Solenza Dacia Logan Dacia Sandero

Starting 2011 Dacia replaced the old KxJ with Euro 5 1.0 (16 valves), 1.2 (16 valves) and 1.6-litre engines.

=== Applications (K4J 16v) ===
Engine code	Power	Year(s)	Car(s)
K4J 700/714/750	70 to 72 kW (95 to 98 PS; 94 to 97 hp) at 6000 rpm	1999–2008	Renault Clio II; Renault Mégane; Renault Scénic; Renault Scénic II
K4J 730/732/740	60 to 72 kW (82 to 98 PS; 80 to 97 hp) at 6000 rpm	2003–2010	Renault Mégane II; Renault Scénic II
K4J 712/713	70 kW (95 PS; 94 hp) at 6000 rpm		Renault Clio II; Renault Thalia II
K4J 770/780	72 kW (98 PS; 97 hp) at 6000 rpm	2004–2010	Renault Clio III; Renault Modus; Renault Grand Modus
K4J 730	72 kW (98 PS; 97 hp) at 6000 rpm	1999–2003	Renault Scénic (I)

== KxM petrol engine ==
The KxM engine has a displacement of 1.6 L (1,598 cc) featuring multi-point fuel injection and EGR emission control system fitted.

Technical specifications
Displacement	1.6 L (1,598 cc)
Bore x Stroke	79.5 mm × 80.5 mm (3.13 in × 3.17 in)
Total number of valves	8/16
Max. power	55–66 kW (75–90 PS; 74–89 hp)/ 70–85 kW (95–116 PS; 94–114 hp)
Type of fuel injection	MPi
Fuel type	petrol
Catalytic converter	present
Oil capacity	4.5 L (4.8 US qt; 4.0 imp qt)
Recommended engine oil	5w30

=== Applications (K7M 8v) ===
Engine code	Power	Year(s)	Car(s)
K7M 410 (E4)	64 kW (87 PS; 86 hp) 5500 rpm	2012–	Lada Largus
K7M 702/703	66 kW (90 PS; 89 hp) 5000 rpm	1995–1999	Renault Mégane; Renault Scénic
K7M 720	55 kW (75 PS; 74 hp) 5000 rpm	1995–1999	Renault Mégane; Renault Scénic
K7M 790	66 kW (90 PS; 89 hp) 5000 rpm	1996–1999	Renault Mégane
K7M 744/745	66 kW (90 PS; 89 hp) 5250 rpm	1998–2003	Renault Clio II
K7M 710	64 kW (87 PS; 86 hp) 5500 rpm	2004–2010; 2008–2010	Dacia Logan; Dacia Sandero
K7M 718 (LPG E4)	64 kW (87 PS; 86 hp) 5500 rpm	2007–2010; 2008–2010	Dacia Logan; Dacia Sandero
K7M 764 (Flex-fuel)	73 kW (99 PS; 98 hp) 5500 rpm	2013–	Dacia Logan; Dacia Sandero
K7M 800	62 kW (84 PS; 83 hp) 5250 rpm	2011–	Dacia Logan; Dacia Sandero
K7M 812	60 kW (82 PS; 80 hp) 5000 rpm	2012–	Dacia Lodgy; Dacia Dokker
K7M 818 (LPG E5)	64 kW (87 PS; 86 hp) 5500 rpm	2011–2012	Dacia Logan; Dacia Sandero
K7M 828 (LPG E5b)	60 kW (82 PS; 80 hp) 5000 rpm	2014–	Dacia Lodgy; Dacia Dokker

=== Applications (K4M 16v) ===
Engine code	Power	Year(s)	Car(s)
K4M 490	77 kW (105 PS; 103 hp) 5750 rpm	2012–	Lada Largus
K4M 69x	66 to 77 kW (90 to 105 PS; 89 to 103 hp) at 5750 rpm	2006–	Renault Kangoo II; Dacia Logan; Secma F16
K4M 606 (4x4)	77 kW (105 PS; 103 hp) at 5750 rpm	2010–2013	Dacia Duster
K4M 616 (LPG E5)	77 kW (105 PS; 103 hp) at 5750 rpm	2011–2013	Dacia Duster
K4M 642 (LPG E5b)	77 kW (105 PS; 103 hp) at 5750 rpm	2014–	Dacia Duster
K4M 646 (4x4)	77 kW (105 PS; 103 hp) at 5750 rpm	2014–	Dacia Duster
K4M 696 (Hi-flex)	77 kW (105 PS; 103 hp) at 5750 rpm	2010–2012	Dacia Duster; Dacia Logan; Dacia Sandero
K4M 70x	71 to 81 kW (97 to 110 PS; 95 to 109 hp) at 5750 rpm	1999–	Renault Mégane; Renault Scénic; Renault Clio II; Renault Kangoo; Renault Kangoo II; Renault Laguna I
K4M 710	81 kW (110 PS; 109 hp) at 5750 rpm	2001–2005	Renault Laguna (II)
K4M 716	86 kW (117 PS; 115 hp) at 5750 rpm	2006–2007	Renault Laguna (II)
K4M 72x	81 kW (110 PS; 109 hp) at 5750 rpm	1998–2001	Renault Laguna
K4M 782	90 kW (122 PS; 121 hp) at 5500 rpm	2003–2009	Renault Scénic (II)
K4M 788	79 kW (107 PS; 106 hp) at 5750 rpm	2002–2008	Renault Mégane (II)
K4M 812/813/858	86 kW (117 PS; 115 hp) at 6000 rpm	2001–	Renault Mégane (II) (III)
K4M 856 (flexfuel)	77 kW (105 PS; 103 hp) at 5750 rpm	2001–2009	Renault Mégane Eco 2 (flexfuel) (II)
K4M 824	81 kW (110 PS; 109 hp) at 6000 rpm	2007–2010	Renault Laguna (III)
K4M 838	82 kW (111 PS; 110 hp) at 6000 rpm	2010–2016	Renault Fluence
K4M 848	74 kW (101 PS; 99 hp) at 5500 rpm	2008–	Renault Mégane (III)
K4M RS (or 854)	99 kW (135 PS; 133 hp) at 6750 rpm	2008–	Renault Twingo RS; Renault Wind
K4M 862	94 kW (128 PS; 126 hp) at 6750 rpm	2009–2011	Renault Clio GT (III)

== K9K dCi ==
Renault K-Type dCi
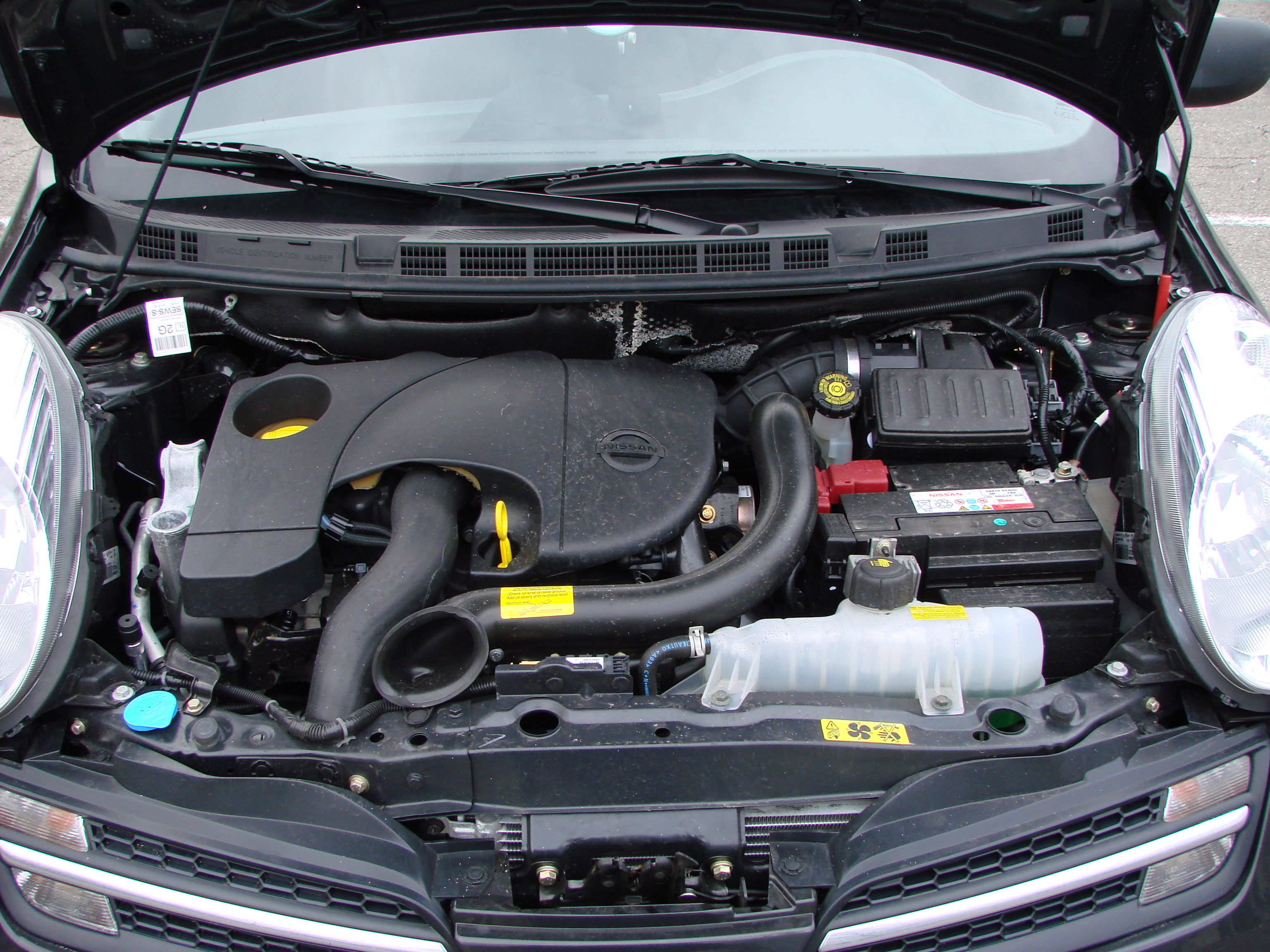

Overview
- Manufacturer: Mercedes-Benz & Renault–Nissan–Mitsubishi Alliance
- Also called: 1.5 dCi, 1.5 bluedCi, Mercedes-Benz OM607, Mercedes-Benz OM608 engine , Nissan Pure-Drive 1.5 dCi, ENERGY 1.5 dCi
- Production: 2001–present

Layout
- Configuration: Inline-4
- Displacement: 1.5 L; 89.2 cu in (1,461 cc)
- Cylinder bore: 76 mm (2.99 in)
- Piston stroke: 80.5 mm (3.17 in)
- Valvetrain: SOHC, 2 valves per cylinder, 8v
- Compression ratio: 15.2:1

Combustion
- Turbocharger: Yes
- Fuel system: Common rail direct injection
- Management: Delphi; Continental (ex Siemens); Bosch
- Fuel type: Diesel
- Cooling system: Water-cooled

Output
- Power output: 65–115 PS (48–85 kW; 64–113 hp)
- Torque output: 160–260 N⋅m (118–192 lb⋅ft)

Chronology
- Predecessor: Renault F-Type engine
- Successor: Renault R-Type engine

The K9K is an automobile engine family – a group of straight-4 8-valve turbocharged Diesel engines co-developed by Nissan and/or Renault, and also Mercedes-Benz Group in formerly regarding the K9K/OM607 engine, now known as OM608. The turbochargers used with this engine are provided by Garrett and BorgWarner. It has a displacement of 1461 cc and is called 1.5 dCi (direct Common-rail injection). Fuel injection systems were supplied by Delphi on the lower power level versions (up to 66 kW (90 PS; 89 hp) and by Continental (ex Siemens) on the higher power level versions (70 kW (95 PS; 94 hp) and higher). The Delphi injection systems have been replaced with Bosch ones in the Euro 5 versions.

There are three versions of this engine: a low power version, a high power version and a high power version with variable-geometry turbocharger. Their maximum power output varies depending on the emission standards they meet.

In Euro 3 standards, their power levels are 65 PS (48 kW); 80 PS (59 kW); 100 PS (74 kW).

In Euro 4 standards, their power levels are 70 PS (51 kW); 85 PS (63 kW); 106 PS (78 kW).

In Euro 5 standards, their power levels are 75 PS (55 kW); 90 PS (66 kW); 110 PS (81 kW). Torque outputs range from 160 to 260 N⋅m (118 to 192 lb⋅ft) at 1,750 rpm.

The engine has been in production since 2001, with over 10 million units sold as of April 2013. Improvements over this period have included coating the tappets to reduce friction by 40%; redesigning the injector spray angle, resulting in a 15% reduction of NO_{x} during combustion and a small improvement in torque; and fitting new piston rings, reducing the tension on the belt-driving engine accessories and optimizing the dimensions of the base engine. The injection pattern has been altered to have two pilot injections over a wide operating range, reducing combustion noise by up to 3 decibels. Still newer technology also includes using a variable-pressure oil pump, and adding stop/start battery technology and low-pressure exhaust-gas recirculation. The K9K engine is produced in Bursa, Turkey; Chennai, India; and Valladolid, Spain. Emissions-wise, it emits as little 90 g (3.2 oz)/km of carbon dioxide.

=== Applications ===
Engine code	Power metric hp/kW	Year(s)	Car(s)
K9K 700 / 704 / 706	65 hp (48 kW)	-	Dacia Logan; Renault Clio (II); Kangoo I; Thalia; Pulse (India); Suzuki Jimny; Nissan Micra (III, IV); Mahindra Verito; Mahindra Verito Vibe
K9K 712 / 714	68 hp (50 kW)	2006-2008	Renault Clio (II); Renault Thalia
K9K 792	68–75 hp (50–55 kW)	-	Dacia Logan; Dacia Sandero; Renault Clio (II)
K9K 260 / 702 / 710 / 722	82 hp (60 kW)	-	Renault Mégane (II); Renault Clio (II); Renault Thalia; Renault Kangoo; Renault Scénic (II); Nissan Micra (III); Nissan Almera
K9K 266	86 hp (63 kW)	2006-2011	Suzuki Jimny
K9K 728 / 766 / 772 / 796 / 802 / 830	85–86 hp (63–63 kW)	2005-201?	Renault Mégane (II); Renault Modus; Renault Clio (III); Renault Scala (India); Renault Mégane (III); Dacia Sandero; Nissan Micra (III); Nissan Sunny (India)
K9K 764 / 732(282)	106 hp (78 kW)	2005-2010	Renault Clio (III); Renault Modus; Renault Mégane (II); Renault Scénic (II); Renault Kangoo; Nissan Tiida; Nissan Note (I); Nissan Qashqai; Renault Mégane (II)
K9K G8 / 832	106 hp (78 kW)	2009–	Renault Mégane (III); Renault Scénic (III); Renault Fluence; Nissan Cube; Nissan Qashqai
K9K 836/(837 automatic gearbox) / 636	110 hp (81 kW)	2010–	Renault Mégane (III); Renault Laguna; Nissan Cube; Nissan Qashqai
K9K 770 / 892	75–90 hp (55–66 kW)	2010–	Dacia Logan; Dacia Sandero; Renault Clio (III), Renault Fluence; Nissan Note (I); Nissan NV200
K9K 896 / 656	110 hp (81 kW)	2011–	Dacia Duster; Renault Fluence (India); Nissan Juke; Nissan NV200
K9K 846 / OM 607 DE 15 LA	110 hp (81 kW)	2012–	Dacia Lodgy; Renault Mégane (IV); Renault Kadjar; Renault Scénic (IV); Mercedes-Benz A-Class; Mercedes-Benz B-Class; Mercedes-Benz CLA-Class; Mercedes-Benz Citan (as "OM607"); Infiniti Q30
K9K 608 / 609 / OM 607 DE 15 LA	90 hp (66 kW)	2013–	Renault Clio; Renault Captur Nissan Note (E12); Nissan Micra (V); Mercedes-Benz A-Class; Mercedes-Benz B-Class (as A/B 160 CDI "OM607")
K9K 628	90 hp (66 kW)	2016–	Renault Clio
K9K 647	110 hp (81 kW)	2015–	Renault Talisman, Renault Kadjar
K9K 500 (Hybrid Assist)	110 hp (81 kW)	2017–	Renault Scénic (IV);
K9K 872 / 873 / 874 (BlueDCi)	95–115 hp (70–85 kW)	2018–	Dacia Dokker; Dacia Duster (II); Dacia Lodgy; Dacia Logan (II); Dacia Sandero (II); Nissan Qashqai (J11); Renault Captur (II); Renault Kadjar; Renault Kangoo; (II); Renault Mégane (IV)

== See also ==
- Renault R-Type engine
- List of Renault engines
- List of PSA engines
- Nissan HR engine
- Renault–Nissan Alliance
