= European Conference on Radar in Meteorology and Hydrology =

European Conference on Radar in Meteorology and Hydrology (ERAD) is an international scientific conference that has been held every two years since 2000.

The idea of ERAD, which has been perpetuated since its first edition in 2000, is to create an open forum between students, academics, engineers, end users and operational radar operators working with or using weather radars and weather radar data. The goal of this conference is to facilitate mutual understanding between data producers and data users and to help young generations accessing state-of-the-art knowledge on radars, radar signal and radar applications through communication with the most renowned scientists of the field.

== Previous ERADs ==
- 2000 – Bologna, Italy, chairman: Peter Meischner (DLR).
- 2002 – Delft, Netherlands, chairman: Herman Russchenberg (TUD).
- 2004 – Visby, Sweden, chairman: Daniel Michelson (SMHI).
- 2006 – Barcelona, Spain, chairman: Daniel Sempere-Torres (CRAHI-UPC, UPC).
- 2008 – Helsinki, Finland, chairman: Jarmo Koistinen (FMI).
- 2010 – Sibiu, Romania, chairwoman: Aurora Bell (Administratia Nationala de Meteorologie, Romania).
- 2012 – Toulouse, France, chairmans: Olivier Bousquet and Pierre Tabary (Météo-France).
- 2014 – Garmisch-Partenkirchen, Germany, co-chairs: Kathleen Helmert and Martin Hagen (DWD-DLR, Germany).
- 2016 – Antalya, Turkey, co-chairs: Ali Tokay and Kurtulus Ozturk (Turkish State Meteorological Service, Turkey).
- 2018 – Utrecht, Netherlands, co-chairs: Hidde Leijnse (KNMI) and Remko Uijlenhoet (Wageningen University).
- 2020 – Locarno, Switzerland, postponed to 2022 because of Covid-19.
- 2022 – Locarno, Switzerland, co-chairs: Urs Germann (MeteoSwiss) and Alexis Berne (EPFL).
- 2024 – Rome, Italy, Chair: Luca Baldini (ISAC-CNR).
- 2026 – Belgrade, Serbia, Chair: Djordje Mirković (CIWRO/NSSL).

== Next ERAD ==
- 2028 – Helsinki, Finland, Chair: t.b.d.

== See also ==
- Weather radar
