= Automobiles ERAD =

- Industry: Automotive microcars
- Founded: 1975
- Founder: Daniel Renard
- Defunct: 1997
- Fate: Acquired by Savel
- Headquarters: Aniche, Douai, France
- Products: Automobile

Automobiles ERAD (Études et Réalisations du Douaisis, "Concepts and Executions of Douai") was a French manufacturer of microcars. The company was founded by Daniel Renard in 1975, in Douai in northern France. Renard did not have a secondary education, but opened a small garage in Douai in 1967. He built a three-wheeled microcar in his spare time, which gained the attention of a local newspaper. This led to an order of another car by a reader, and the company was born. Series production began in 1978, after the company had moved to bigger premises in the nearby town of Aniche. In 1979 nearly 2400 vehicles were built, while in 1980 employees built 2640. Production came to and end in 1997 (after company funds had been misappropriated by a manager), when Savel (also located in Aniche) bought the company. In total, about 30,000 ERADs were built, of which 800 were electrical vehicles.

== Models ==
ERAD's first model was the Capucine, a plastic-bodied single-seater. It was 169 cm (67 in) long, 125 cm (49 in) wide, 160 cm (63 in) tall, and weighed 170 kg (370 lb). There was an improved model which had almost the same body but with a wider track of 160 cm (63 in). The vehicle was equipped with a two-stroke, 47 cc single-cylinder engine from Sachs. There were two types: front wheel drive and rear wheel drive. The FWD had a controversial Motobécane 50-cc two-stroke engine with a contra piston working as a crankcase compressor, enabling lower engine speeds but more torque. There was seating for two people and a boot which could be used for shopping or other modest baggage. In 1981 this was joined by a 123 cc engine from BCB and a 290 cc diesel engine from Farymann. There was also a handicap version of the Capucine, where the rear of the car was made up of a large door which swung to the side, allowing wheelchair entry via a small ramp. Later, 360 cc Petters AC1 diesels were installed. The Capucine was facelifted in 1984 and gained a convertible model as well as a four-seater.

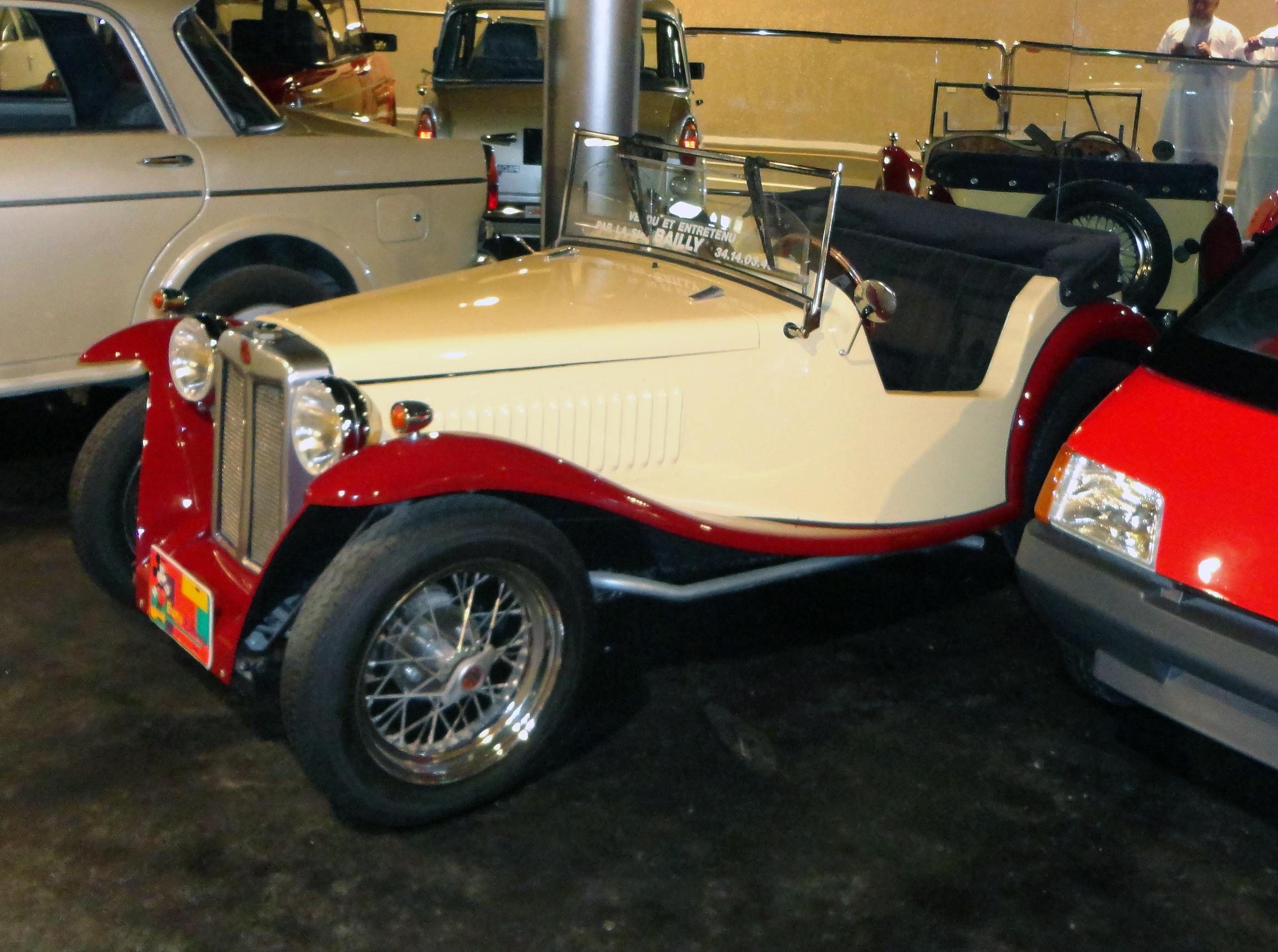
ERAD Midget at the Emirates National Auto Museum

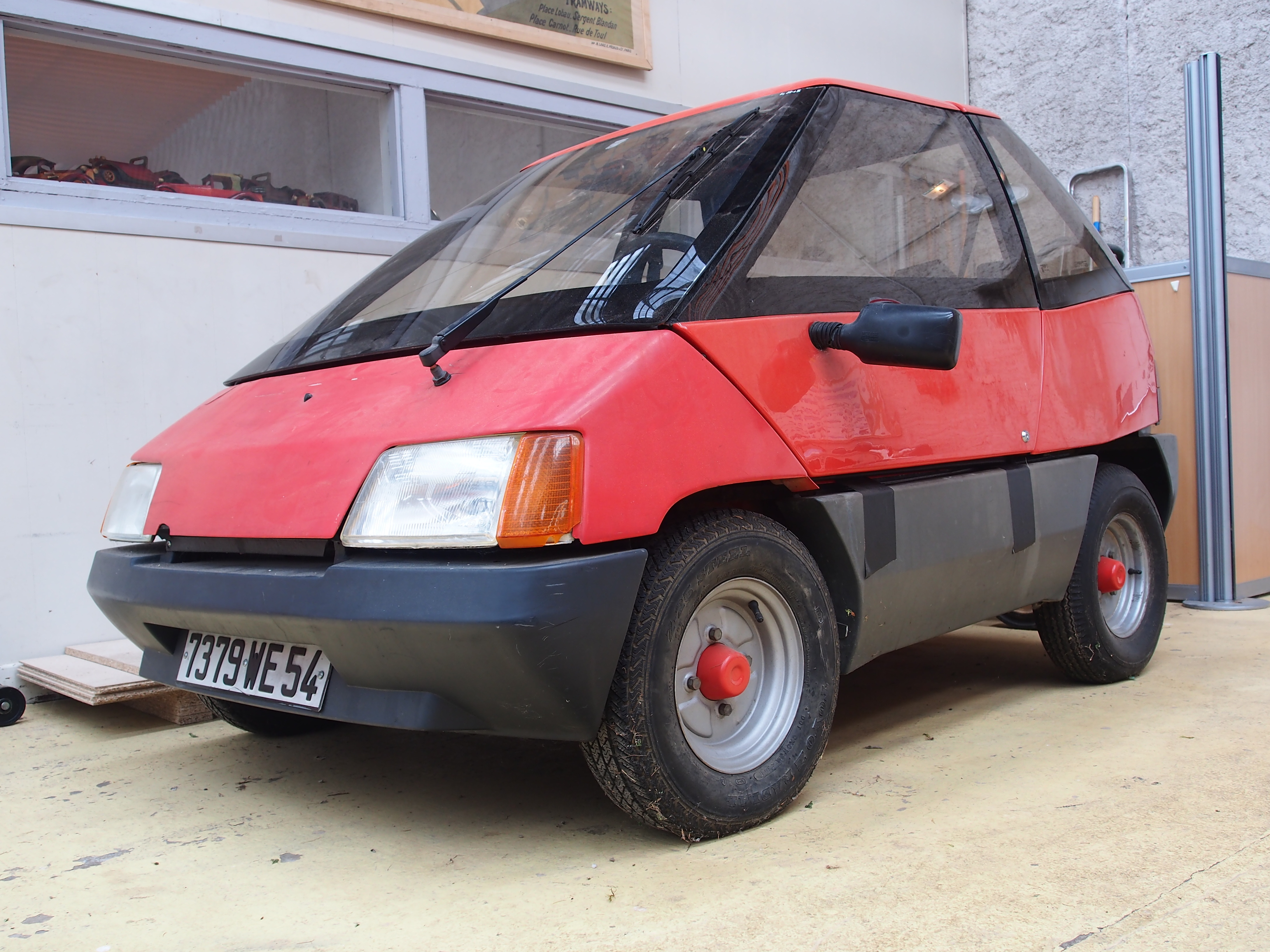
ERAD Junior

In 1982 the ERAD Midget appeared, a 270 cm (106 in) long replica of the 1936 MG Midget, weighing in at 260 kg (573 lb). It has live, leaf-sprung axles front and rear, and drum brakes all around. A 125 cc two-stroke petrol engine or a 600 cc diesel unit were available, but only 24 were built. In 1988 the ERAD Junior appeared, a new low-price model using the headlights from the Peugeot 205. The eye-catching Junior only has one forward-folding door, a large unit which includes the roof of the car. Next followed the 1990 Spacia, similar in appearance to the Renault Twingo. This was available with diesel engines of up to 505 cc or an electrical motor. ERAD's last new car was the two-seat Agora, presented in 1993.

== End of production ==
After ERAD suffered financial troubles due to managerial misconduct, Renard started a new company called SECMA in 1995. Soon thereafter, in 1997, the ERAD factory was sold to the newly created Savel company. Savel was itself liquidated in 2002, and Renard was able to buy back most of his old firm, reincorporating it into SECMA.
