= Renault-Nissan B platform =

Automobile platform

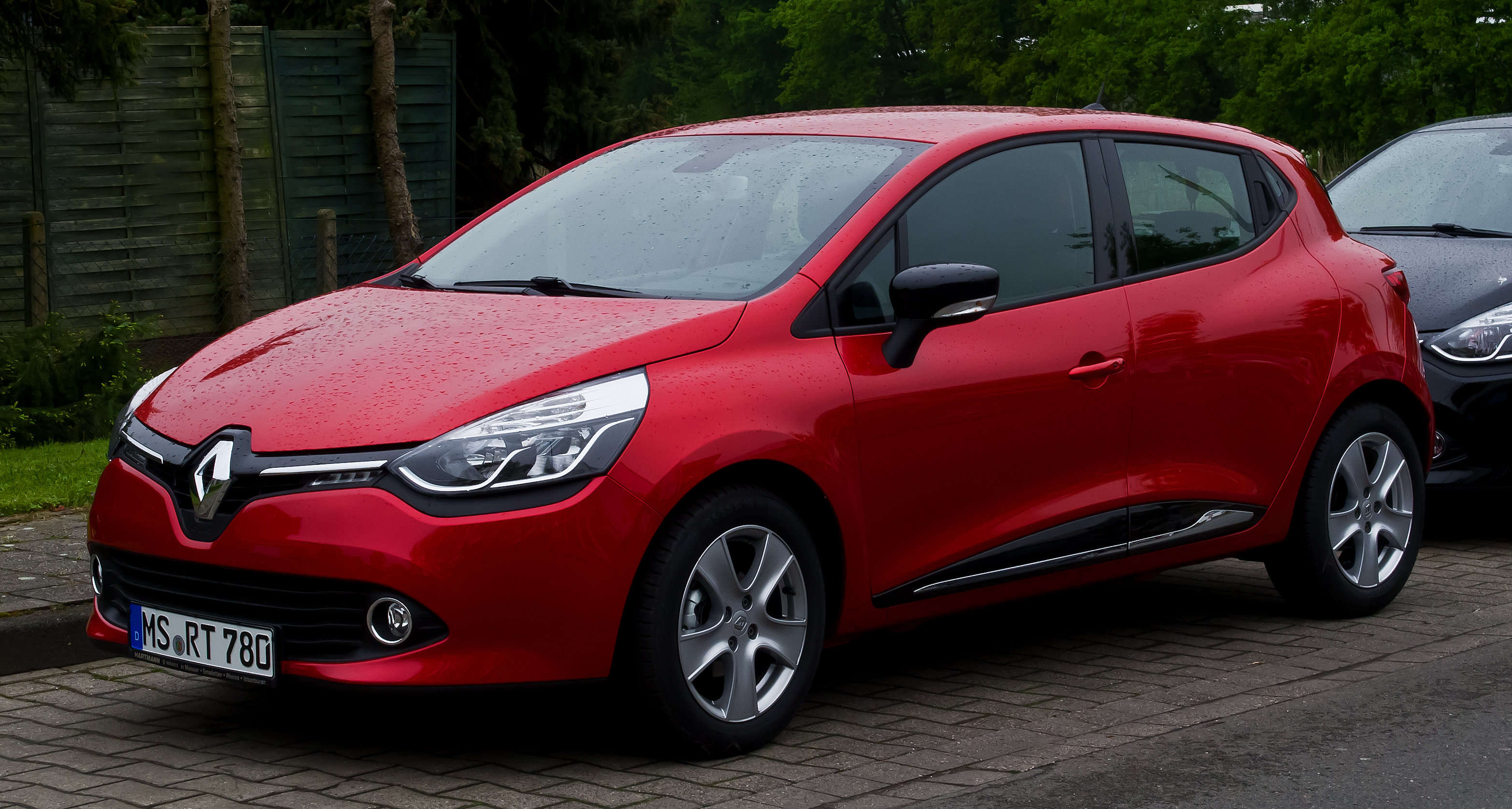
- Fourth generation of Renault Clio, which uses the platform

Overview
- Manufacturer: Renault–Nissan Alliance
- Production: 2002–present

Body and chassis
- Class: Subcompact cars; Compact cars
- Layout: FF; F4
- Body style: Various

Chronology
- Successor: Renault–Nissan Common Module Family B

The B platform is an automobile platform for compact and subcompact cars of the Renault-Nissan Alliance since 2002.

== Nissan-Renault ==
The B-segment B platform was developed through a Nissan led project as a common platform for the Renault-Nissan Alliance. As of 2010, the next generation of this platform has been renamed V platform.

- Nissan Cube
- Nissan Micra/March (K12)
- Nissan Bluebird Sylphy (G11)
- Nissan Livina (L10/L11)
- Nissan Note (E11)
- Nissan NV200
- Nissan Tiida/Versa (C11)
- Nissan Wingroad (Y12)
- Nissan Juke/Infiniti ESQ
- Renault Captur
- Renault Clio III
- Renault Clio IV
- Renault Modus
- Renault Zoe
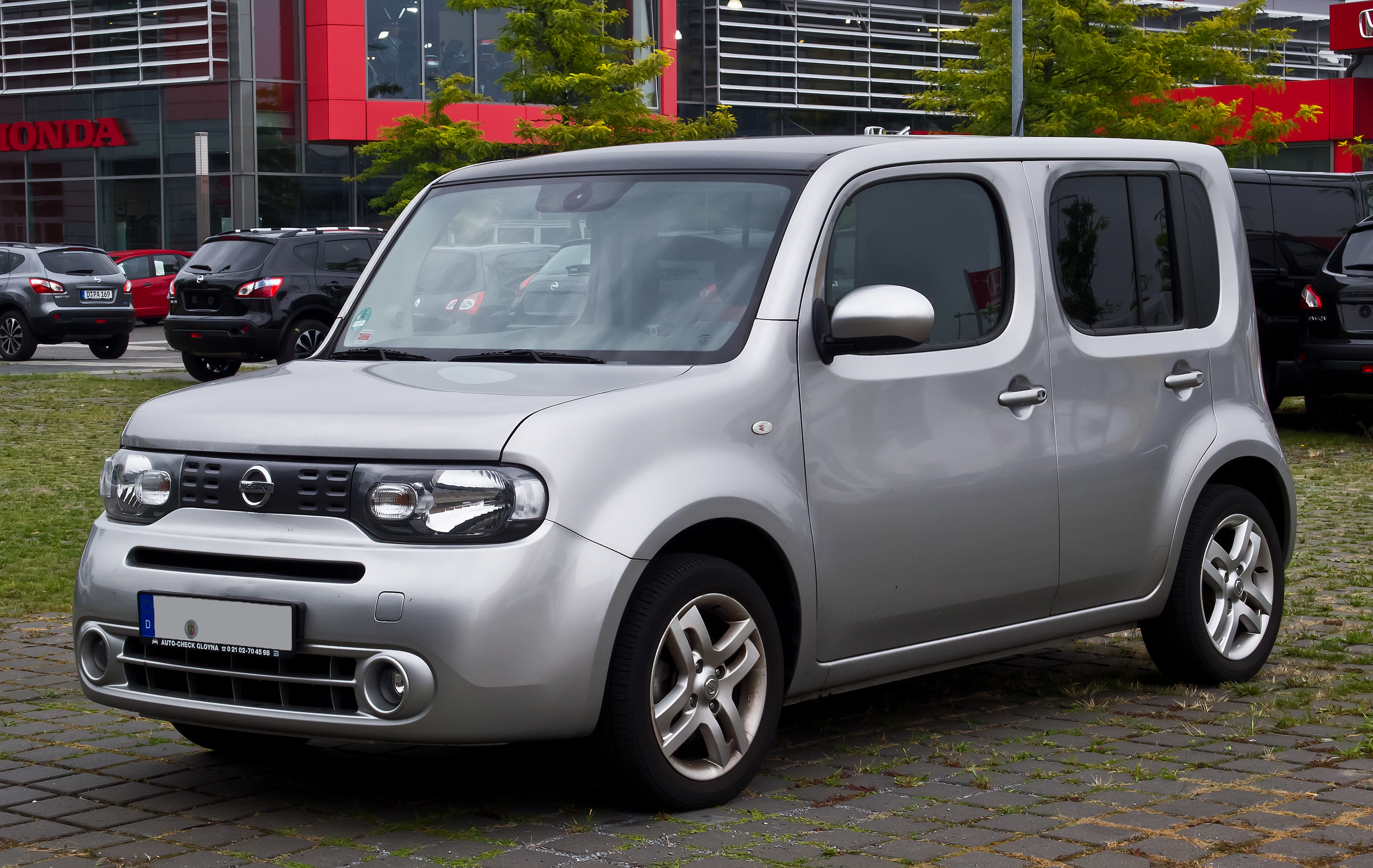
Nissan Cube

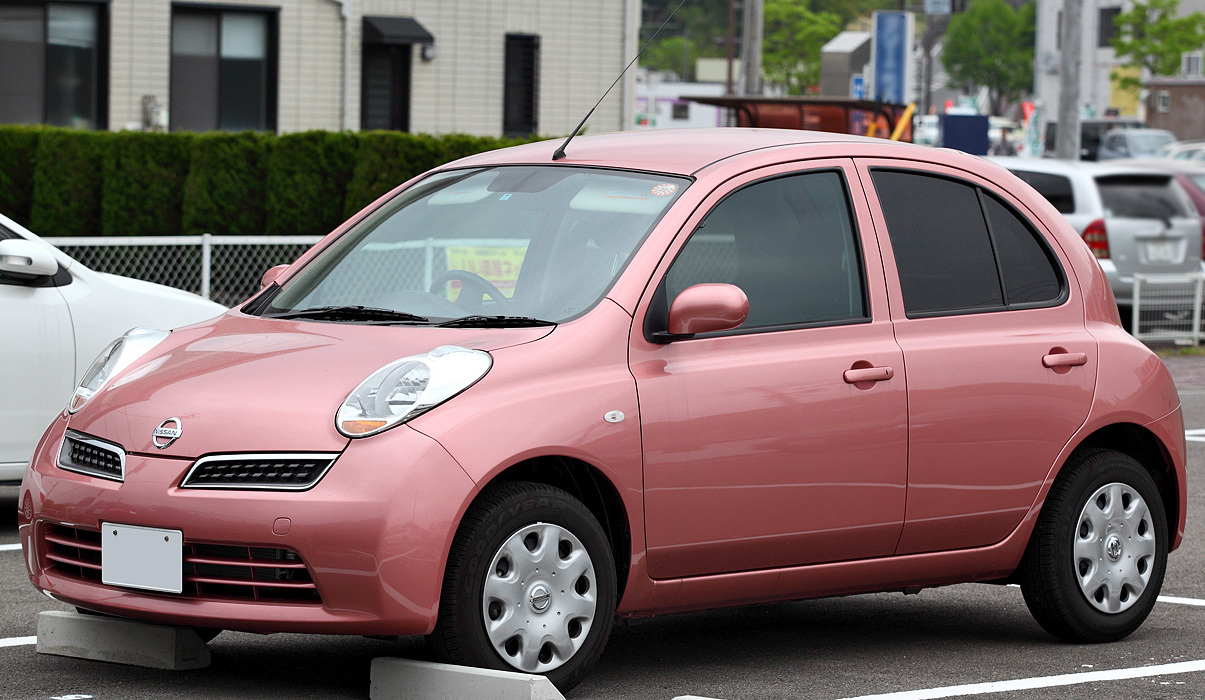
Nissan Micra (K12)

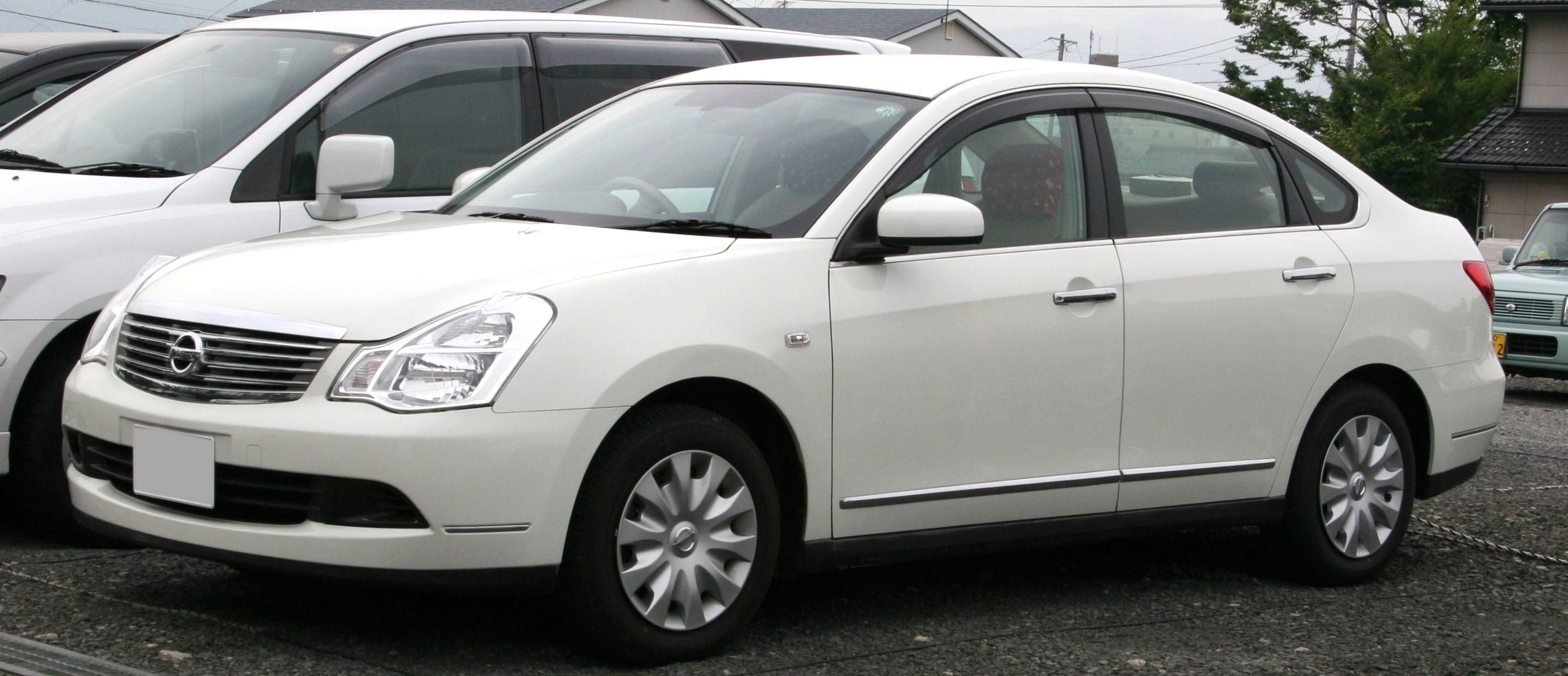
Nissan Bluebird Sylphy (G11)

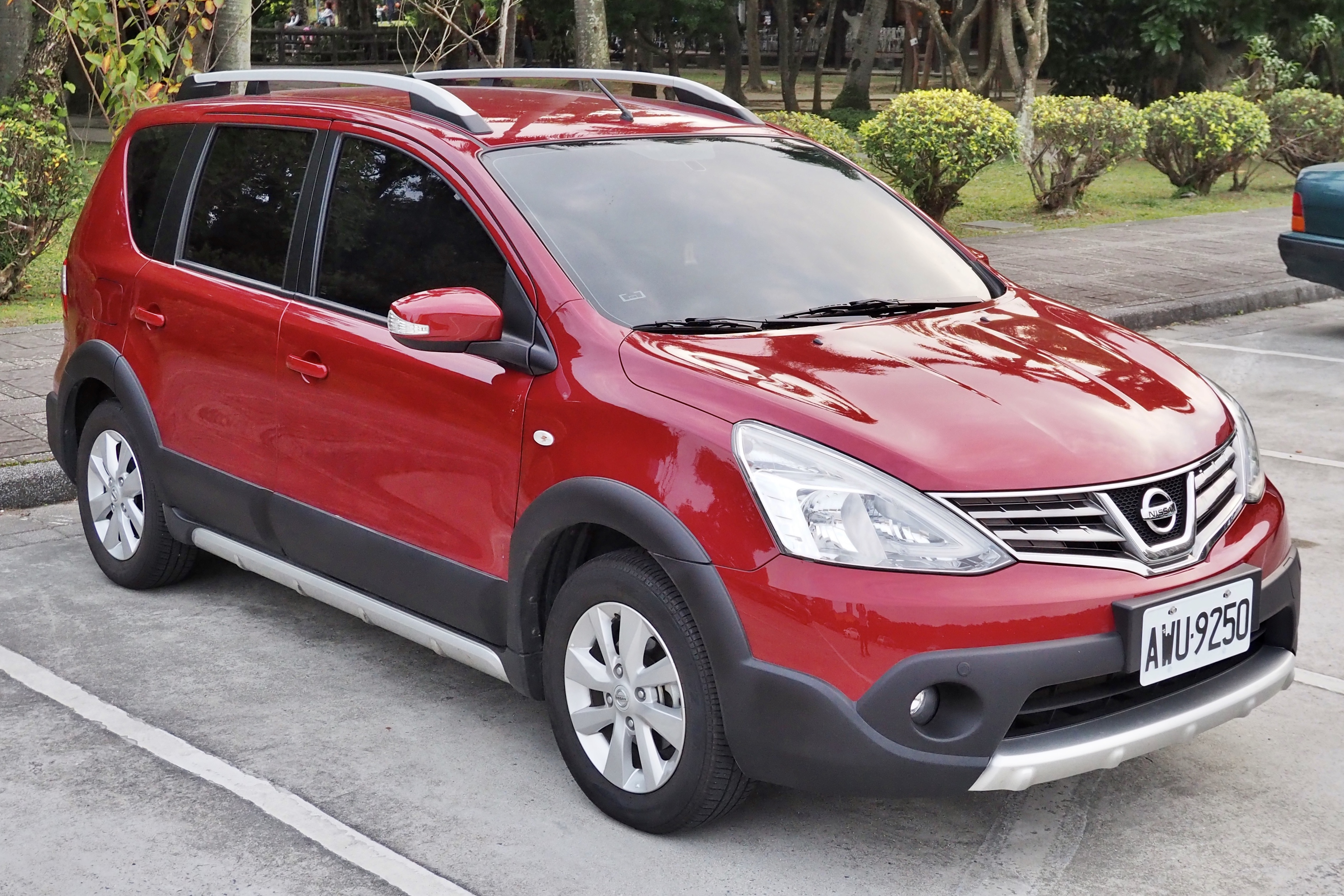
Nissan Livina (L10/L11)

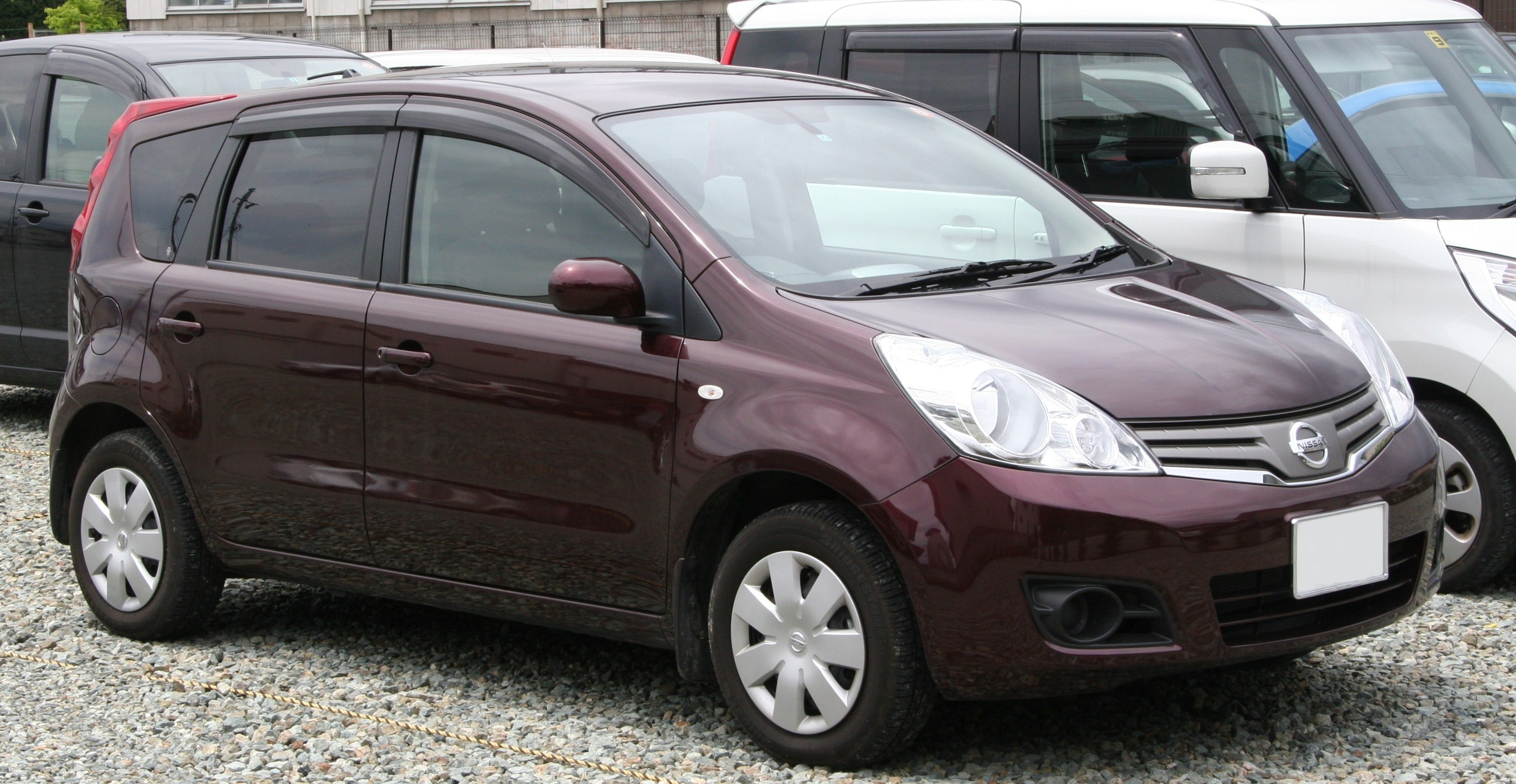
Nissan Note (E11)

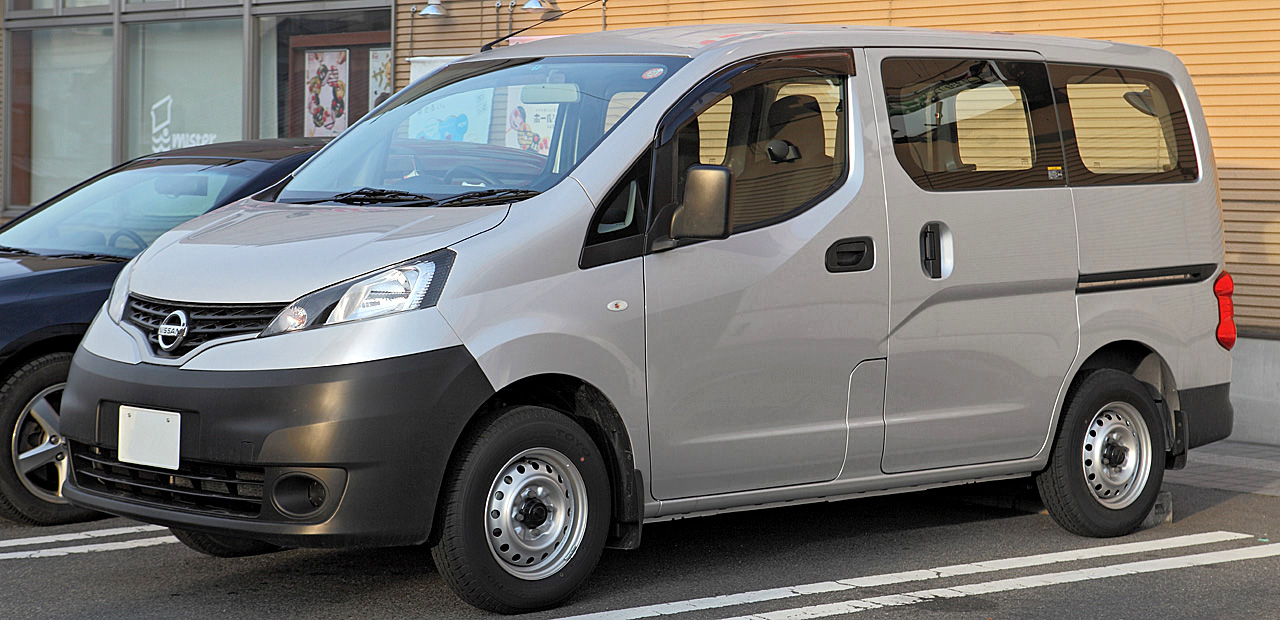
Nissan NV200

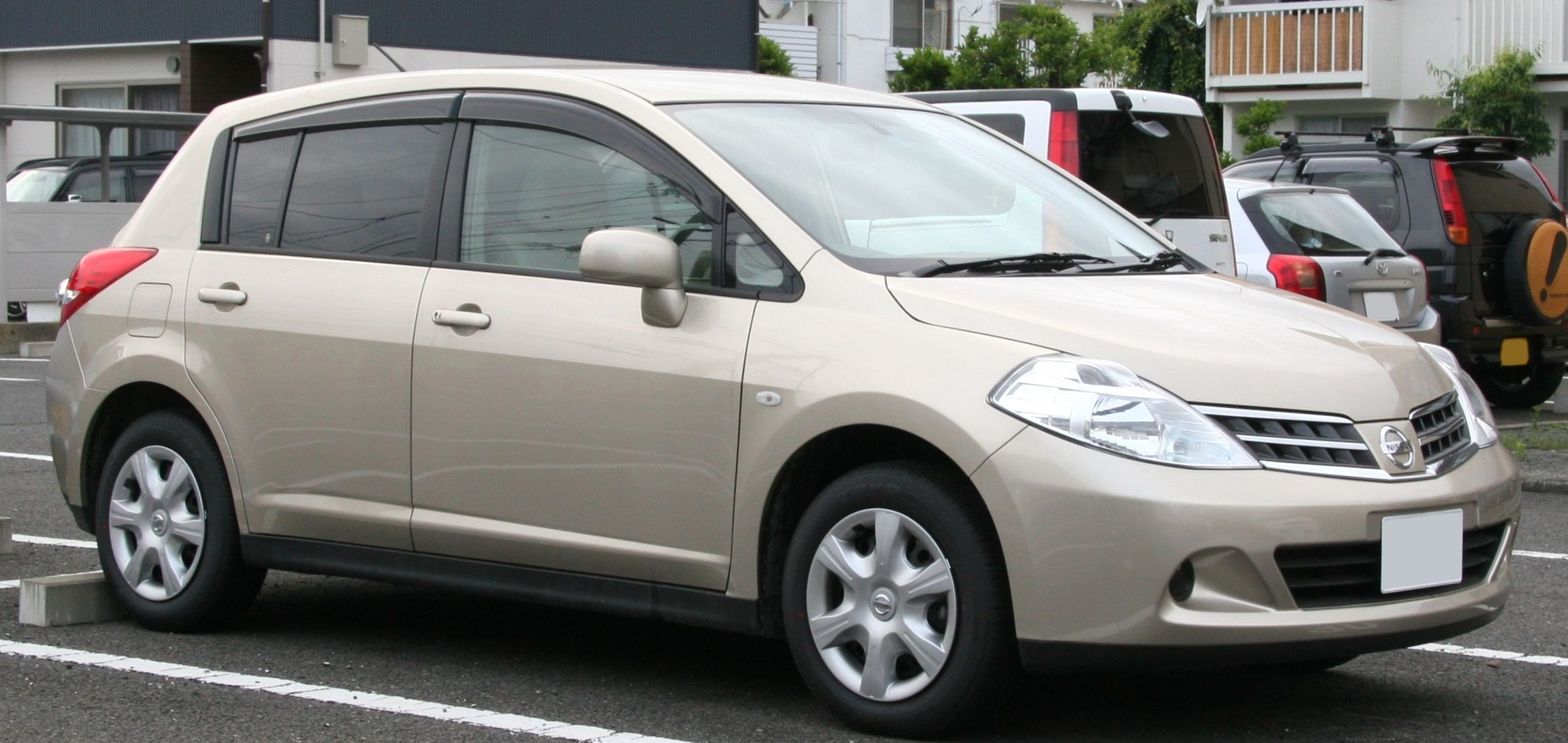
Nissan Tiida/Versa (C11)

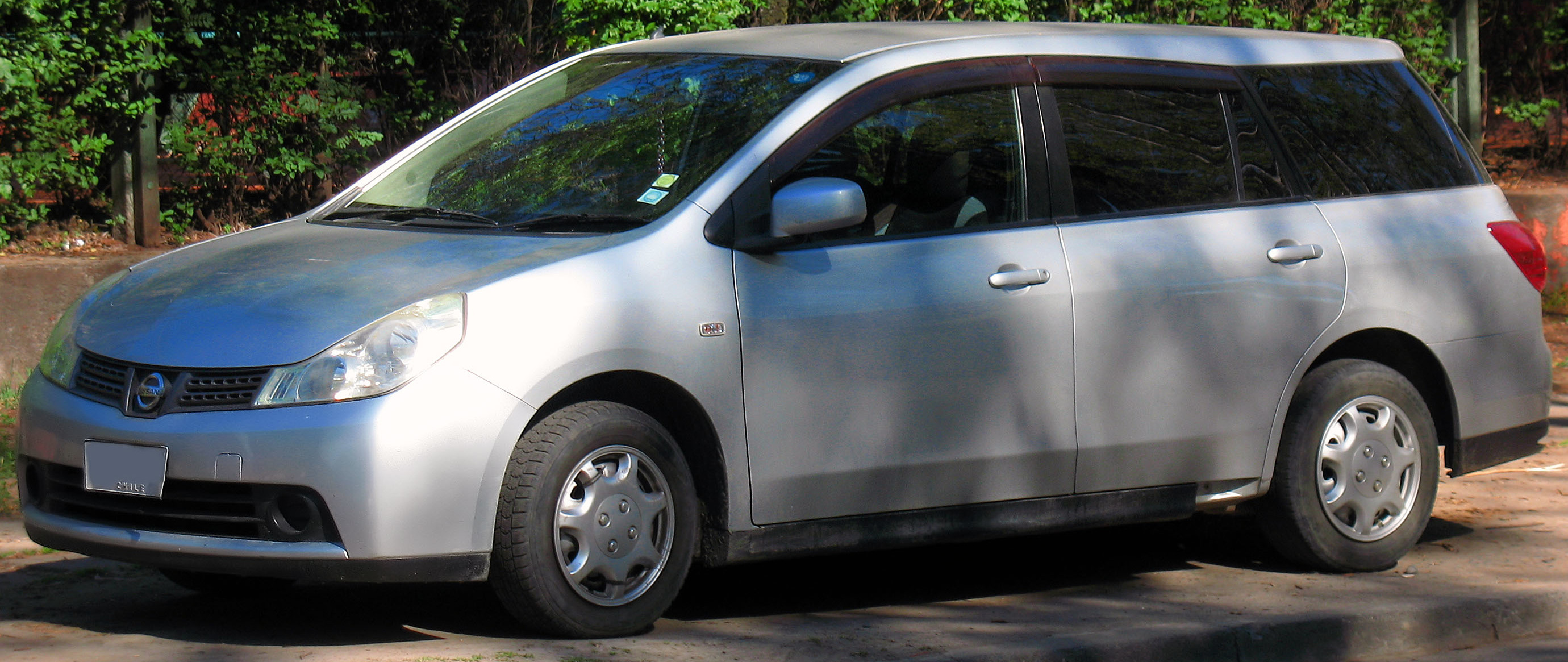
Nissan Wingroad (Y12)

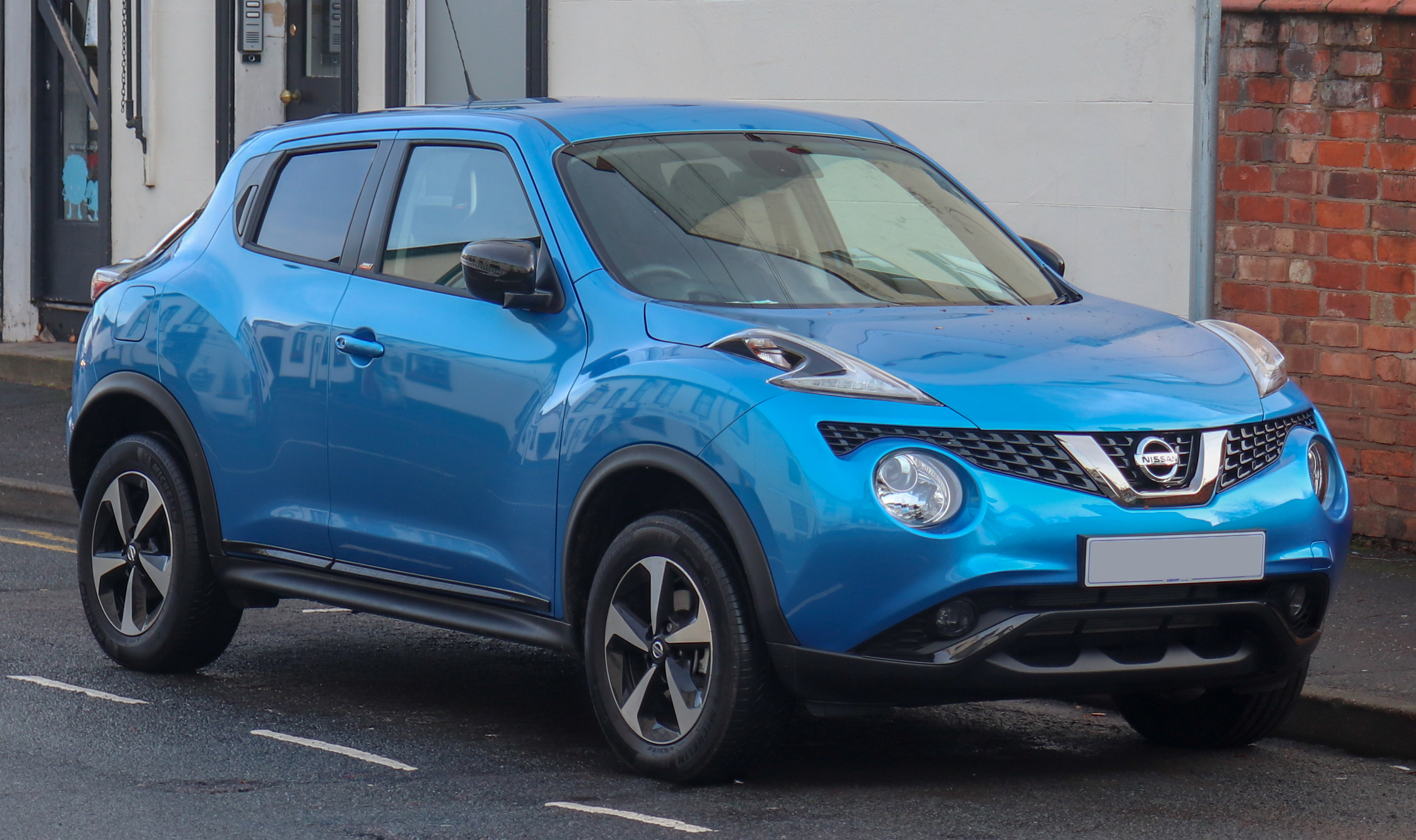
Nissan Juke

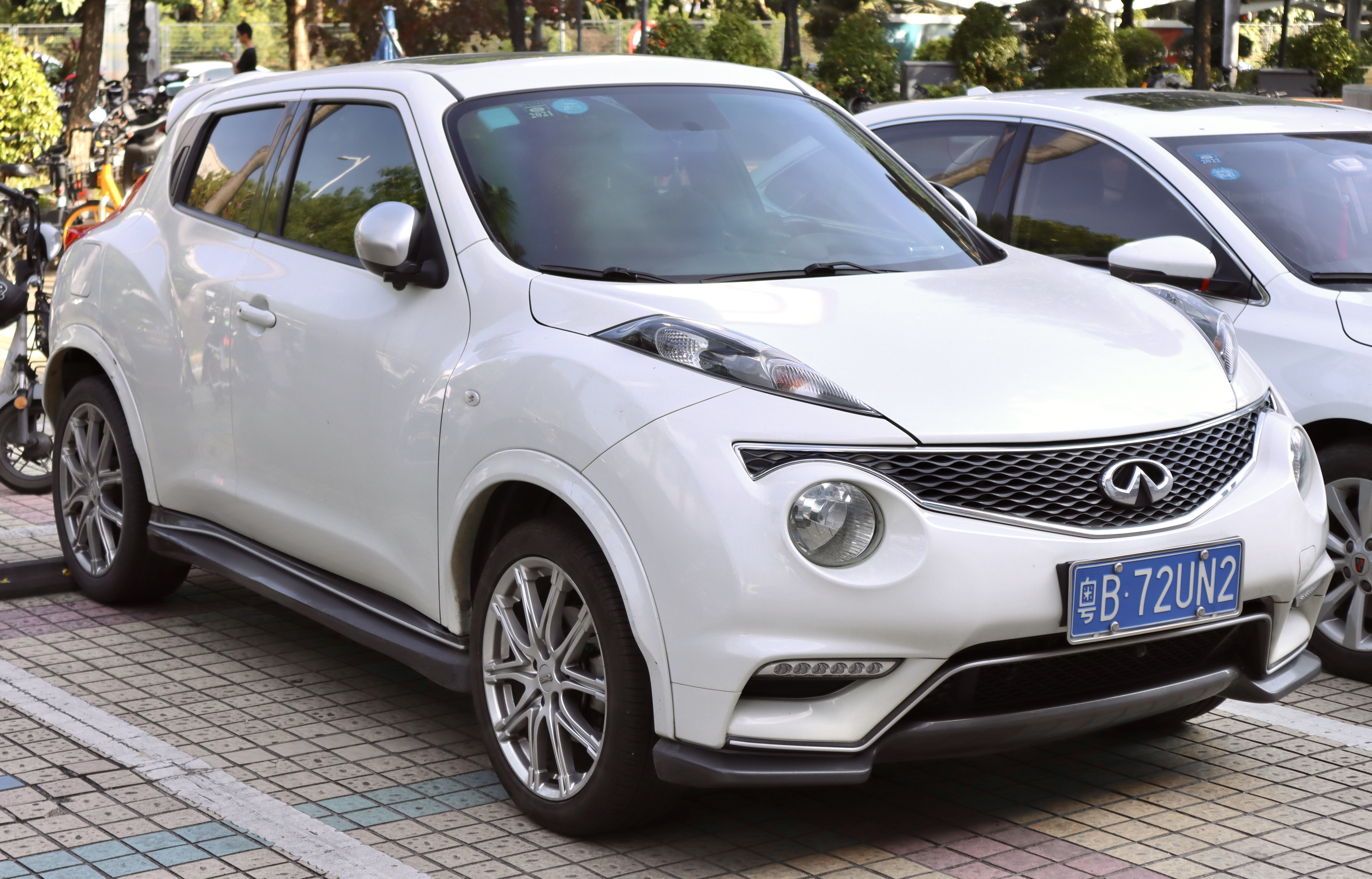
Infiniti ESQ

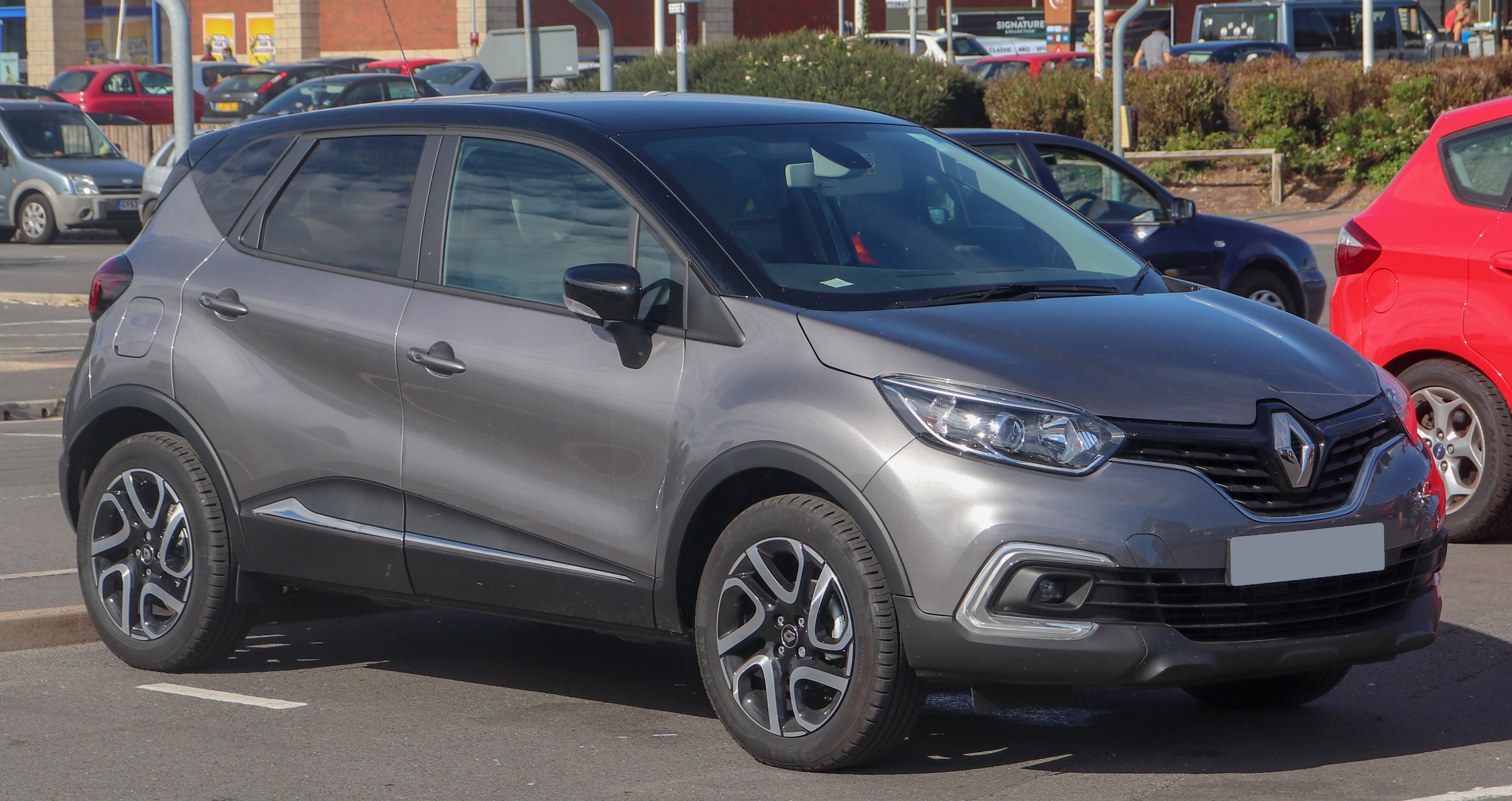
Renault Captur

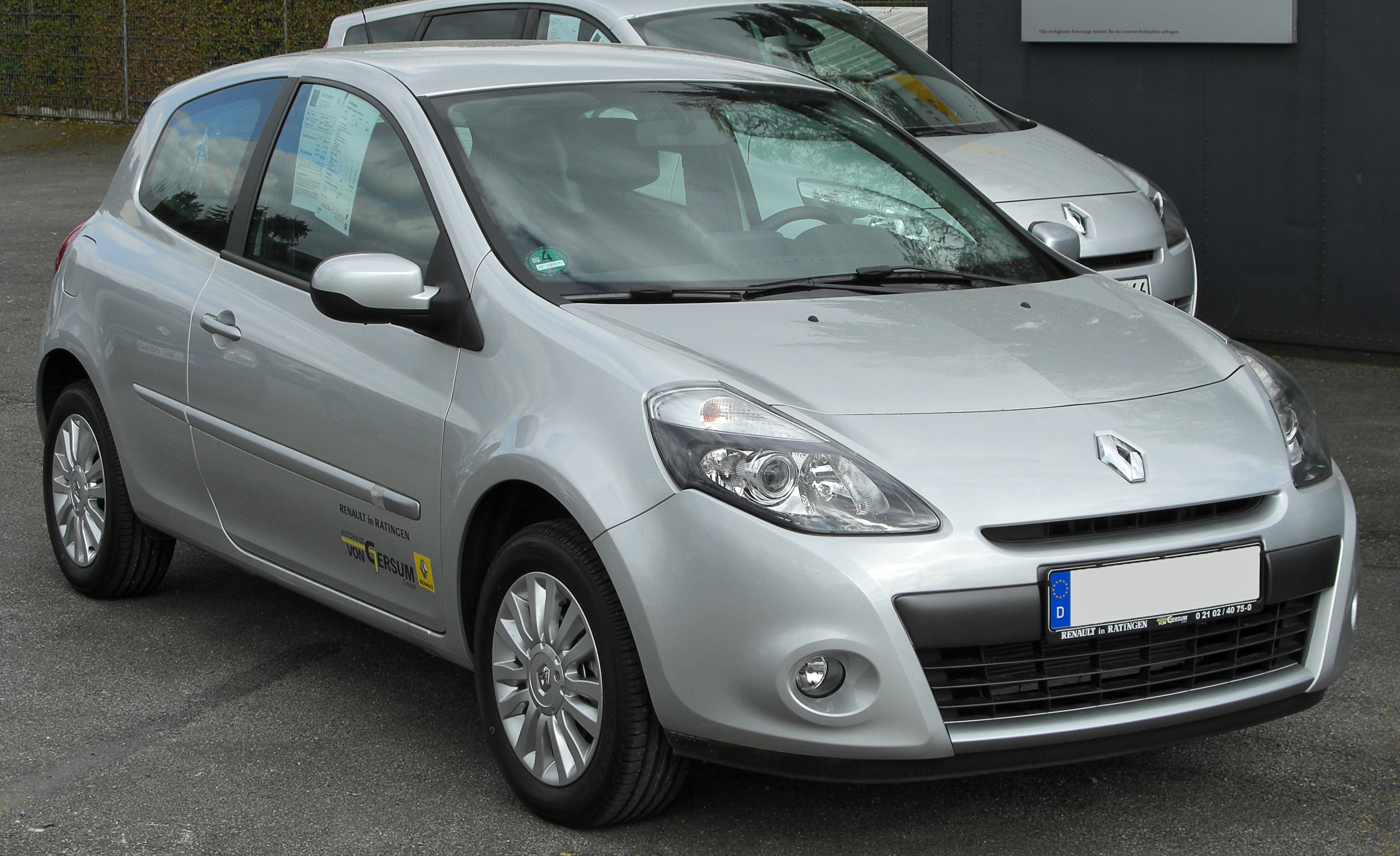
Renault Clio III

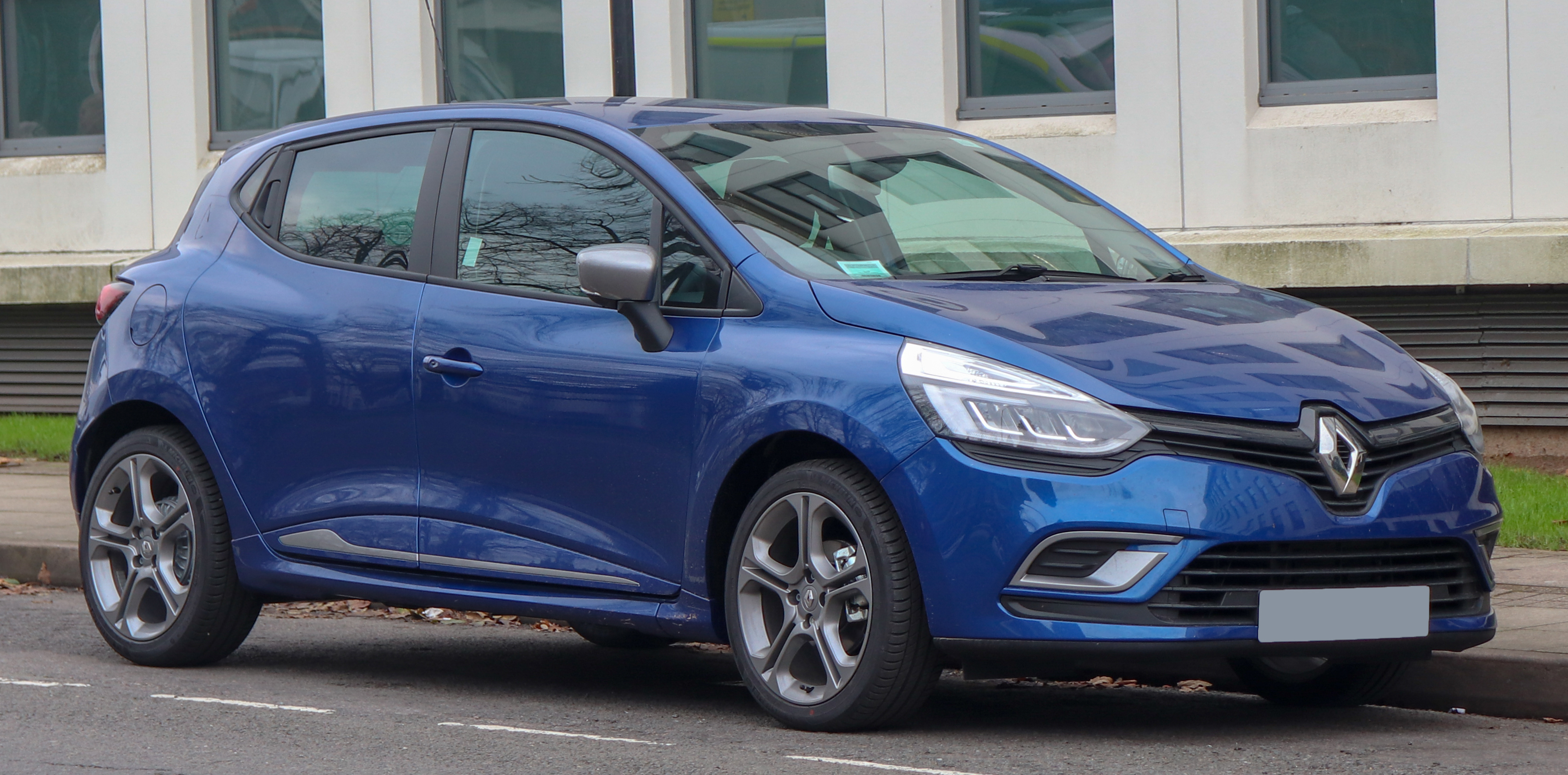
Renault Clio IV

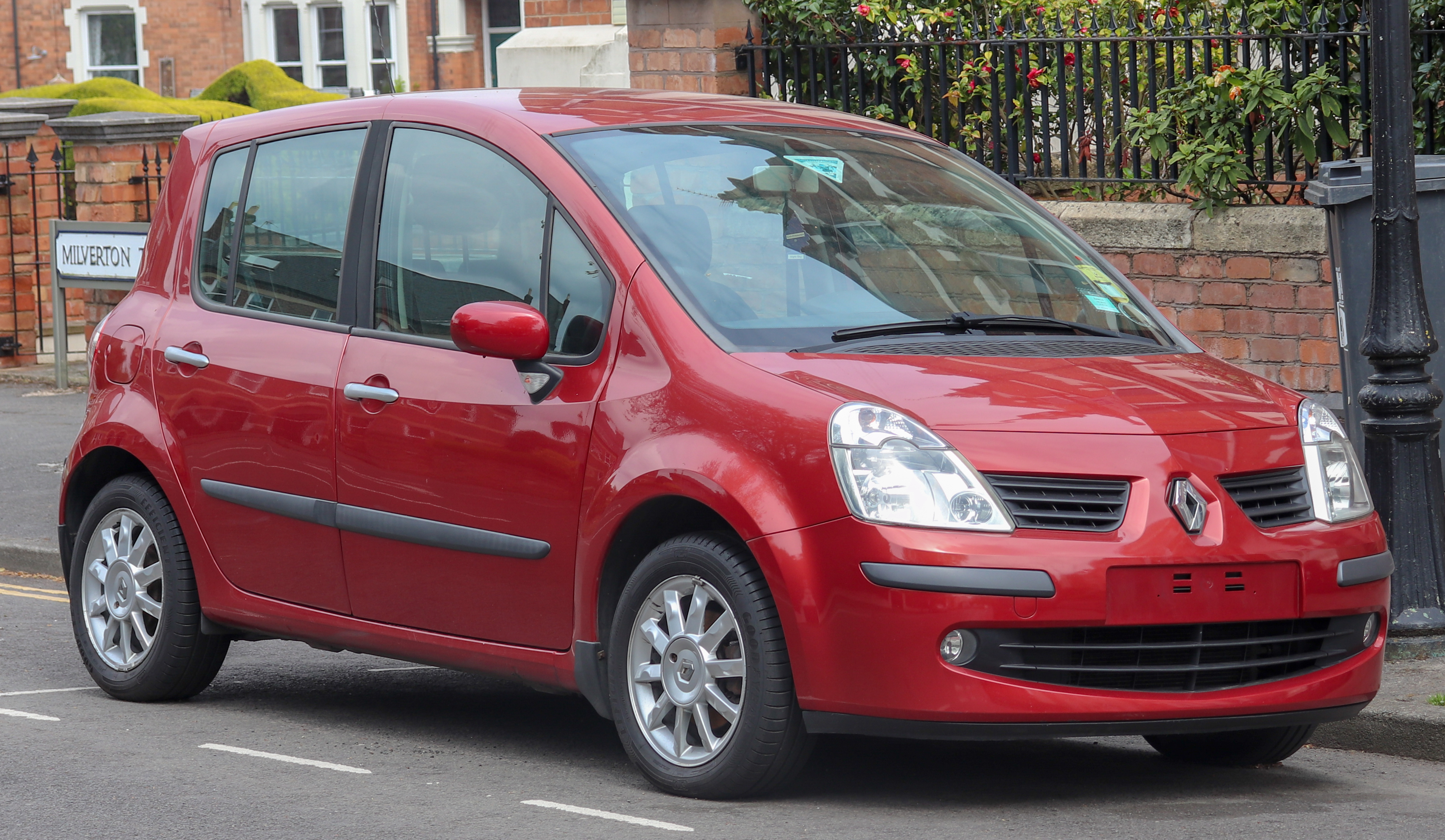
Renault Modus

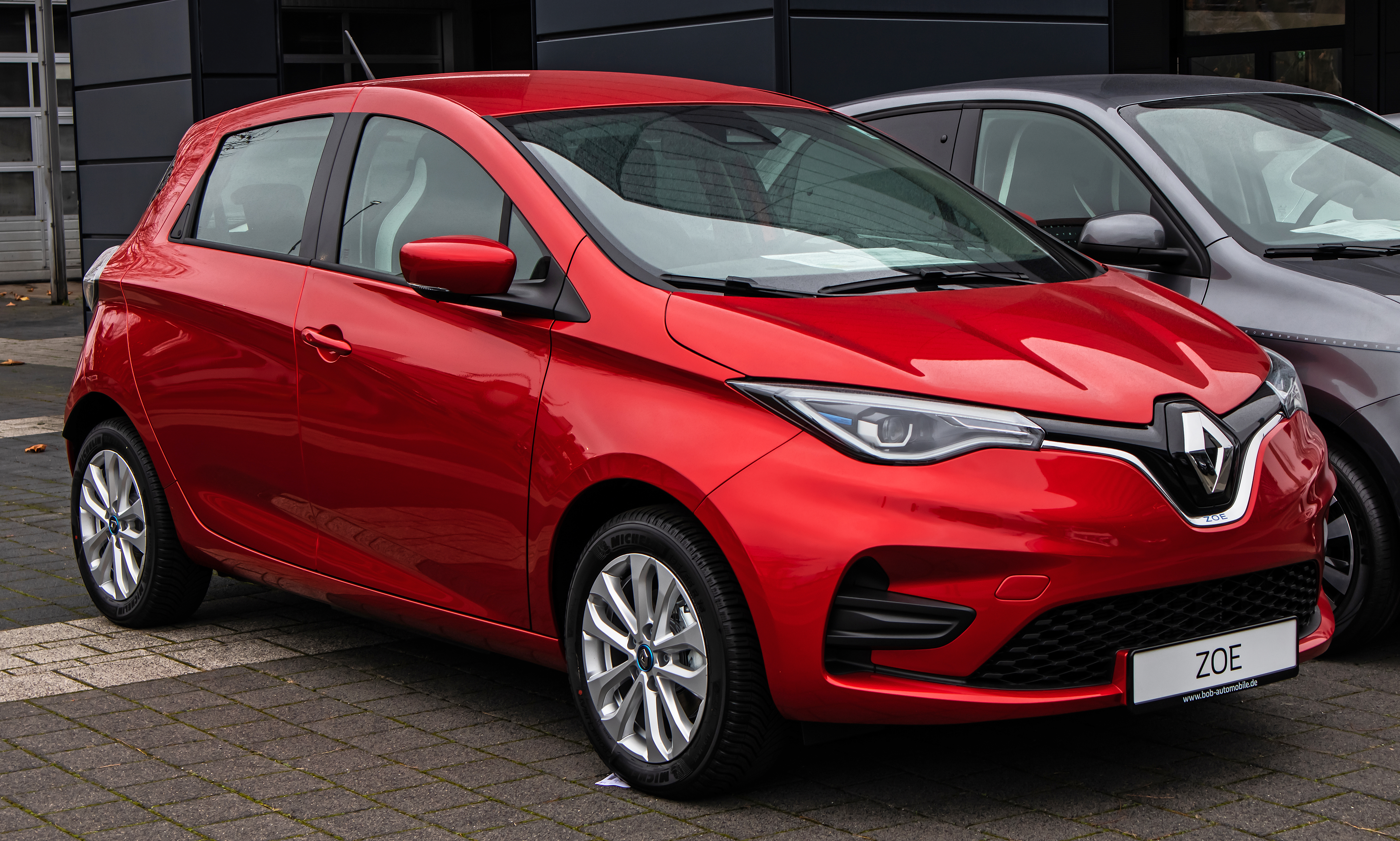
Renault Zoe

== Renault/Dacia B0 platform ==
A version with long wheelbase, named B0 platform since 2004, and developed by Renault/Dacia.

- Dacia Logan
- Dacia Sandero
- Dacia Duster (HS)
- Nissan Terrano (D15) (Russia)
- Nissan Kicks (D15)
- Renault Arkana (Russia)
- Renault Captur/Kaptur (Global Access)
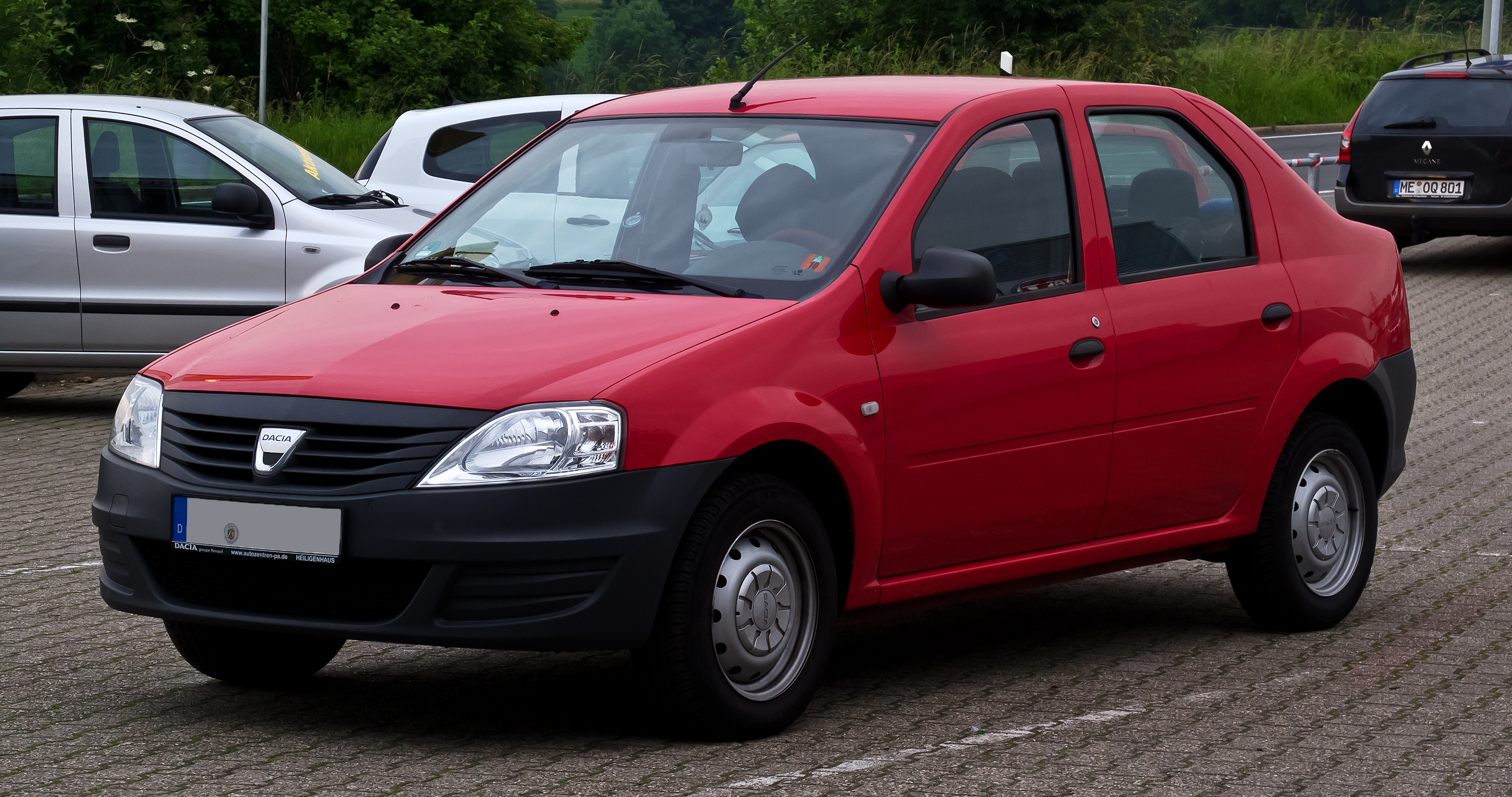
Dacia Logan

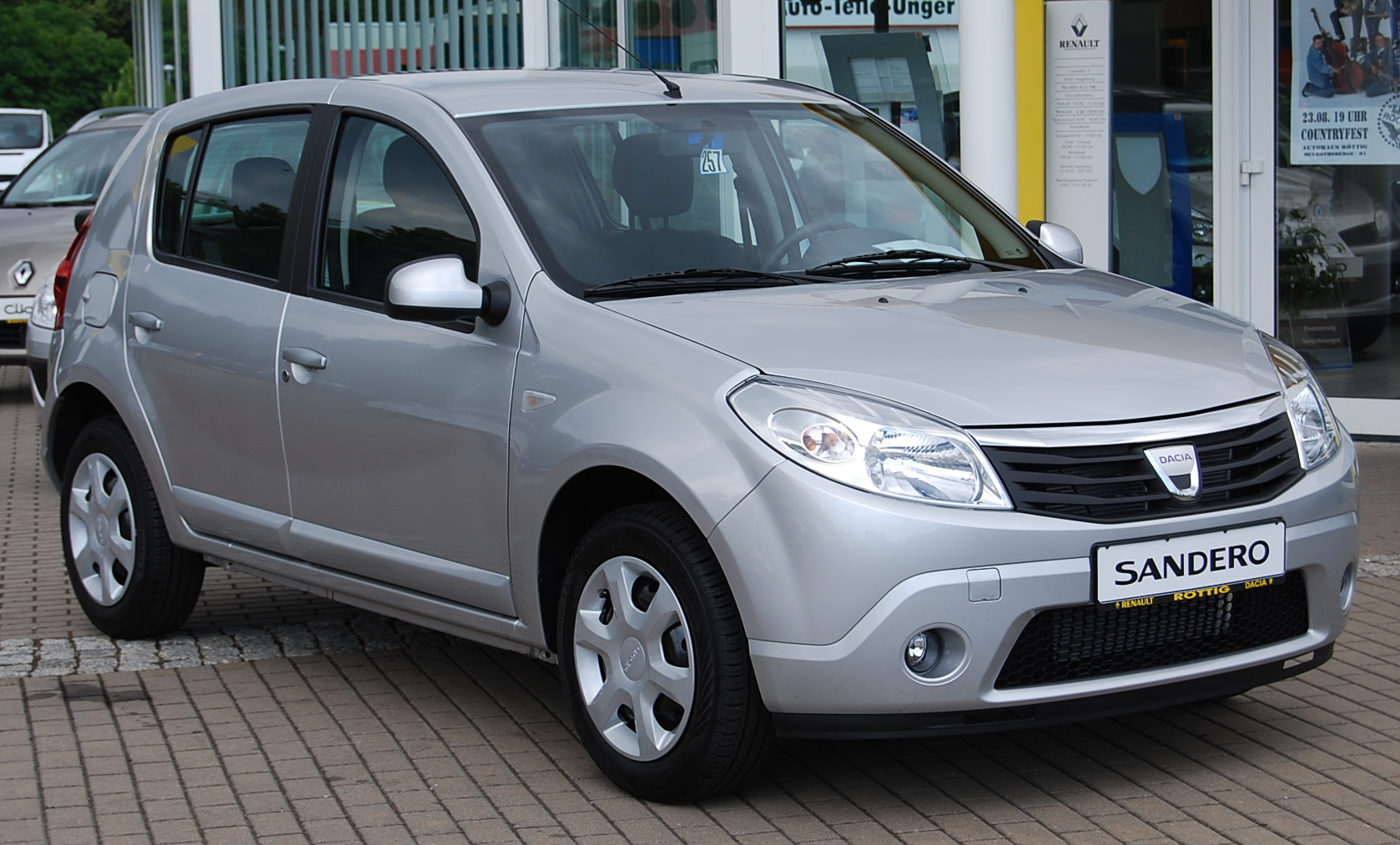
Dacia Sandero

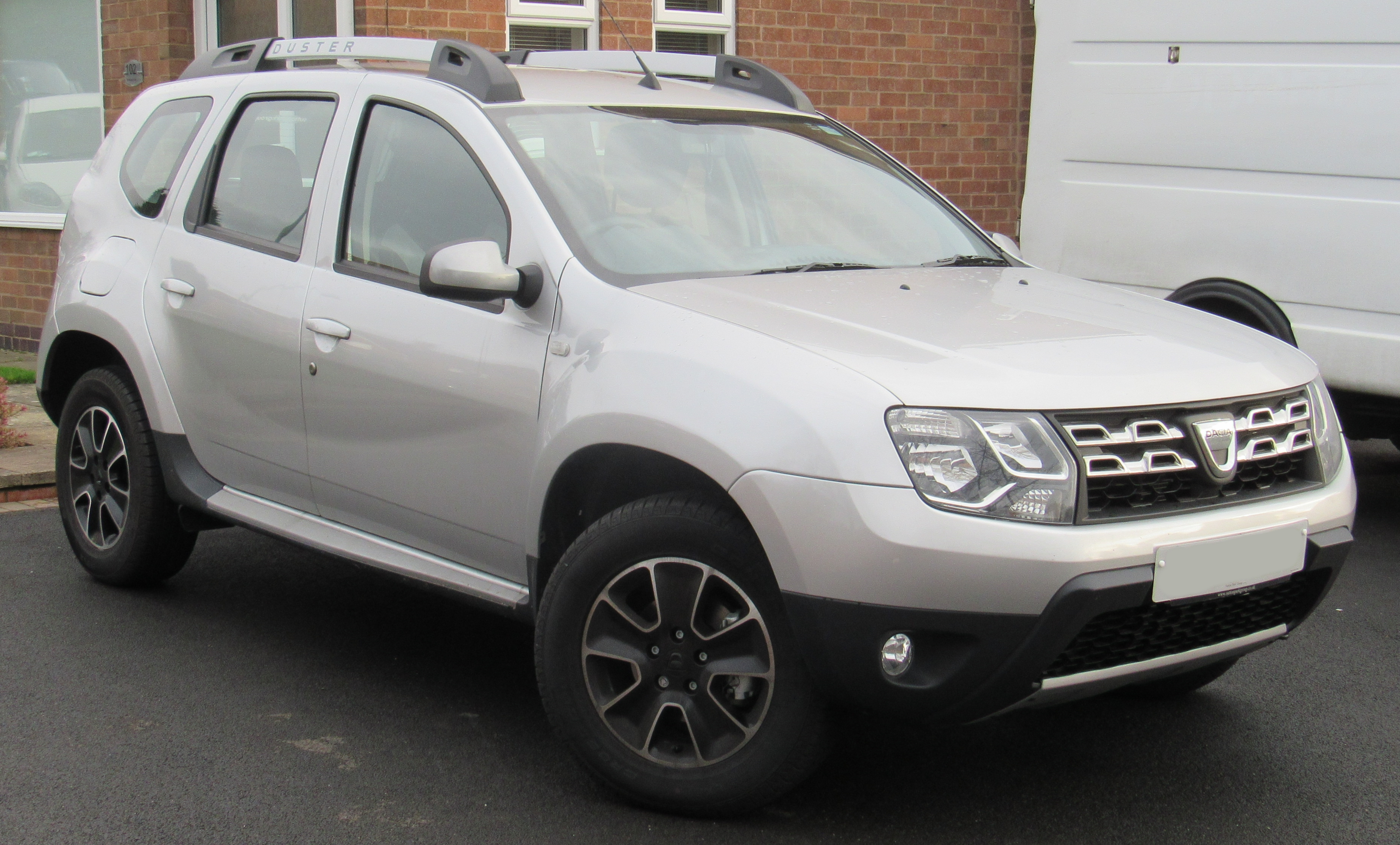
Dacia Duster (HS)

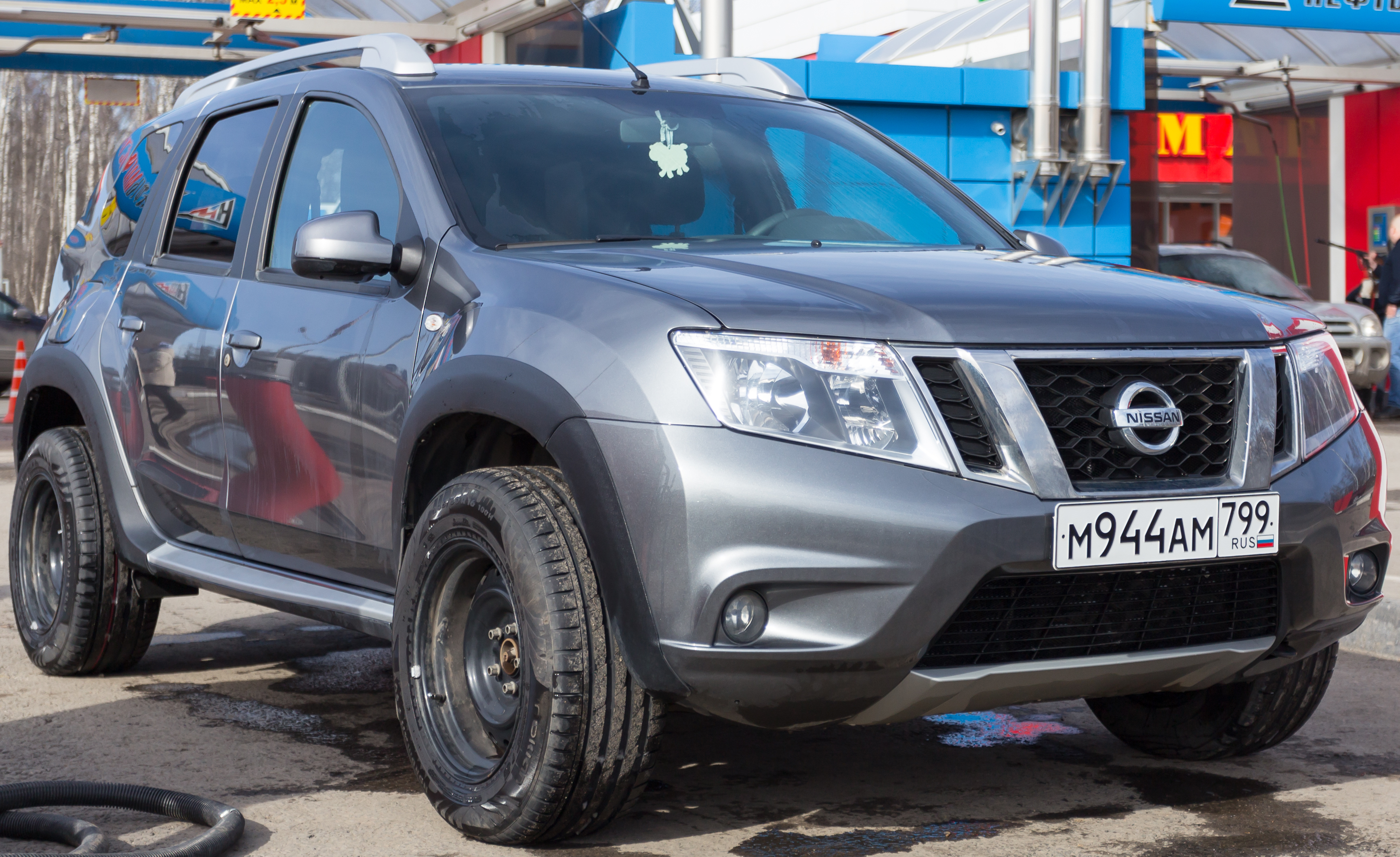
Nissan Terrano (D15)

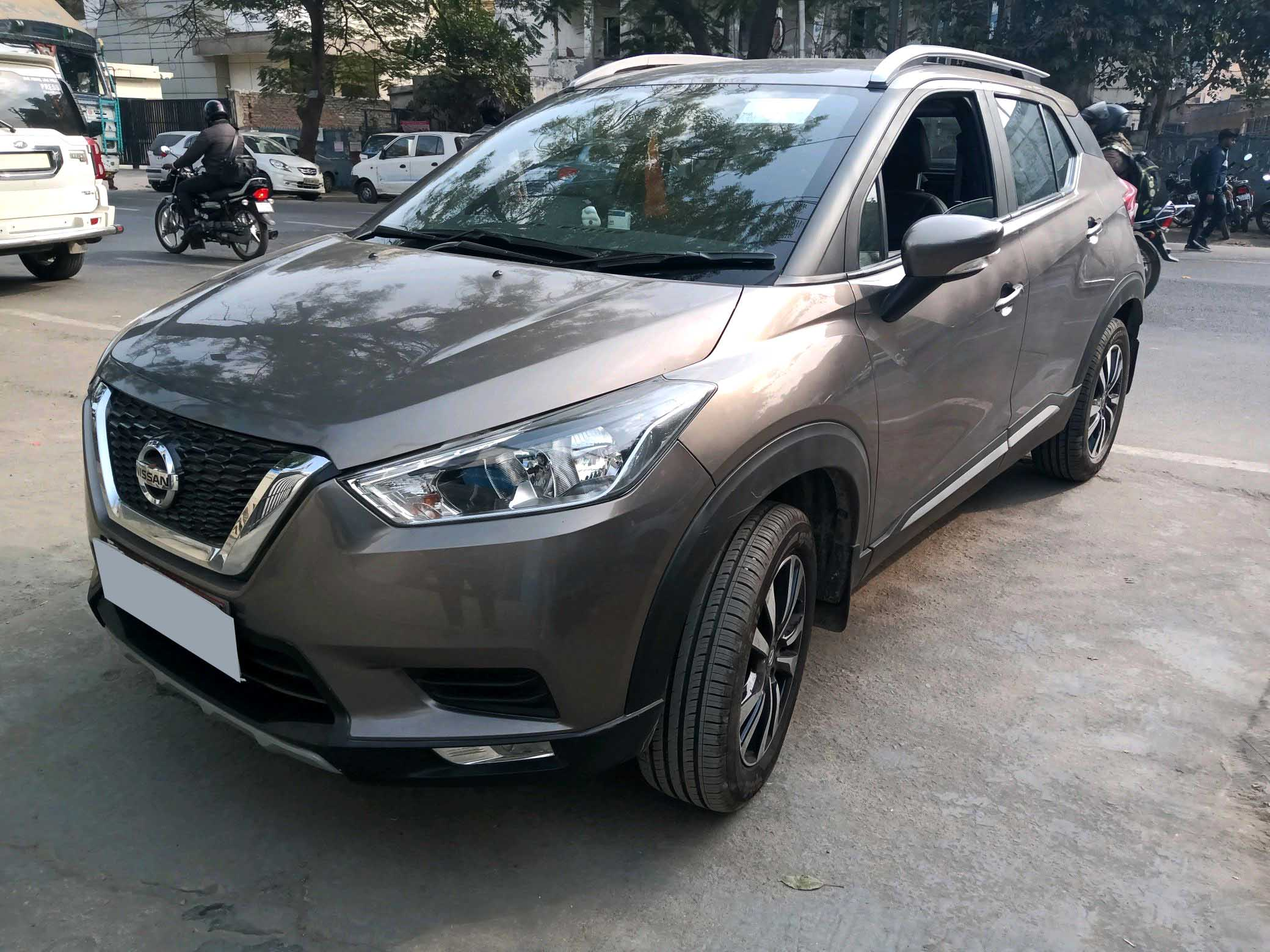
Nissan Kicks (D15)

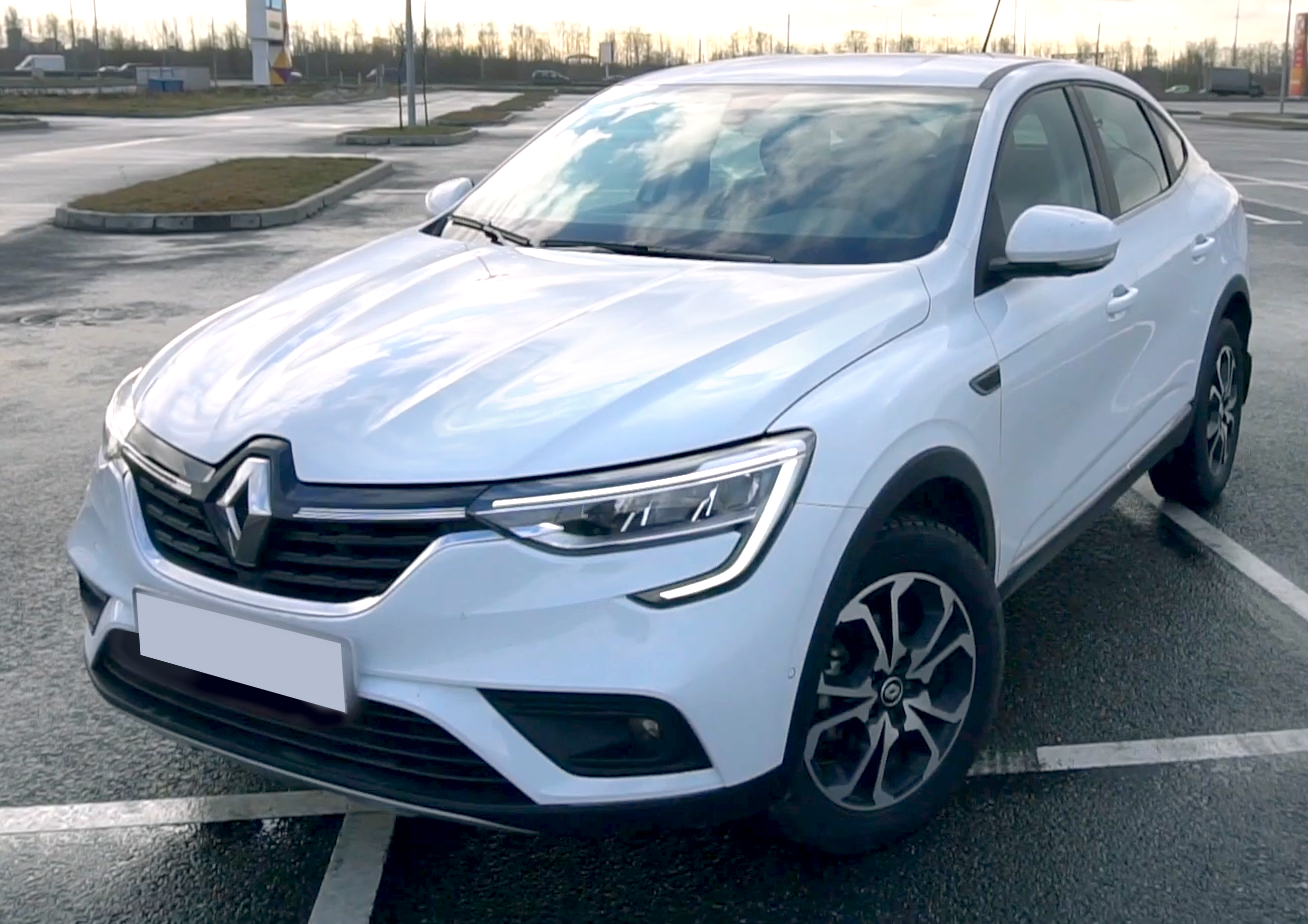
Renault Arkana

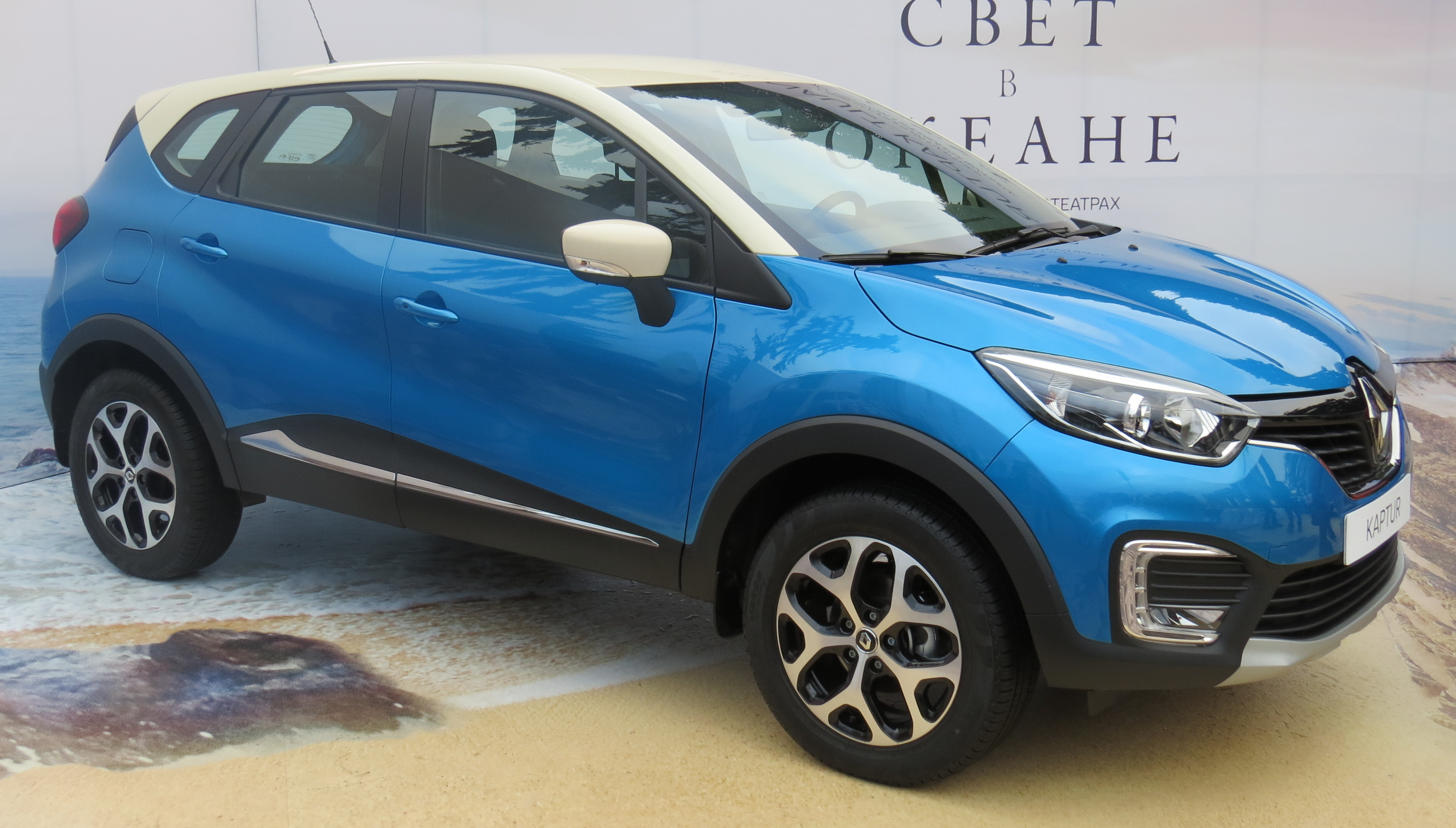
Renault Captur/Kaptur (Global Access)

The B0 platform used by AvtoVAZ for:

- Lada XRAY
- Lada Largus
- Chevrolet Niva concept
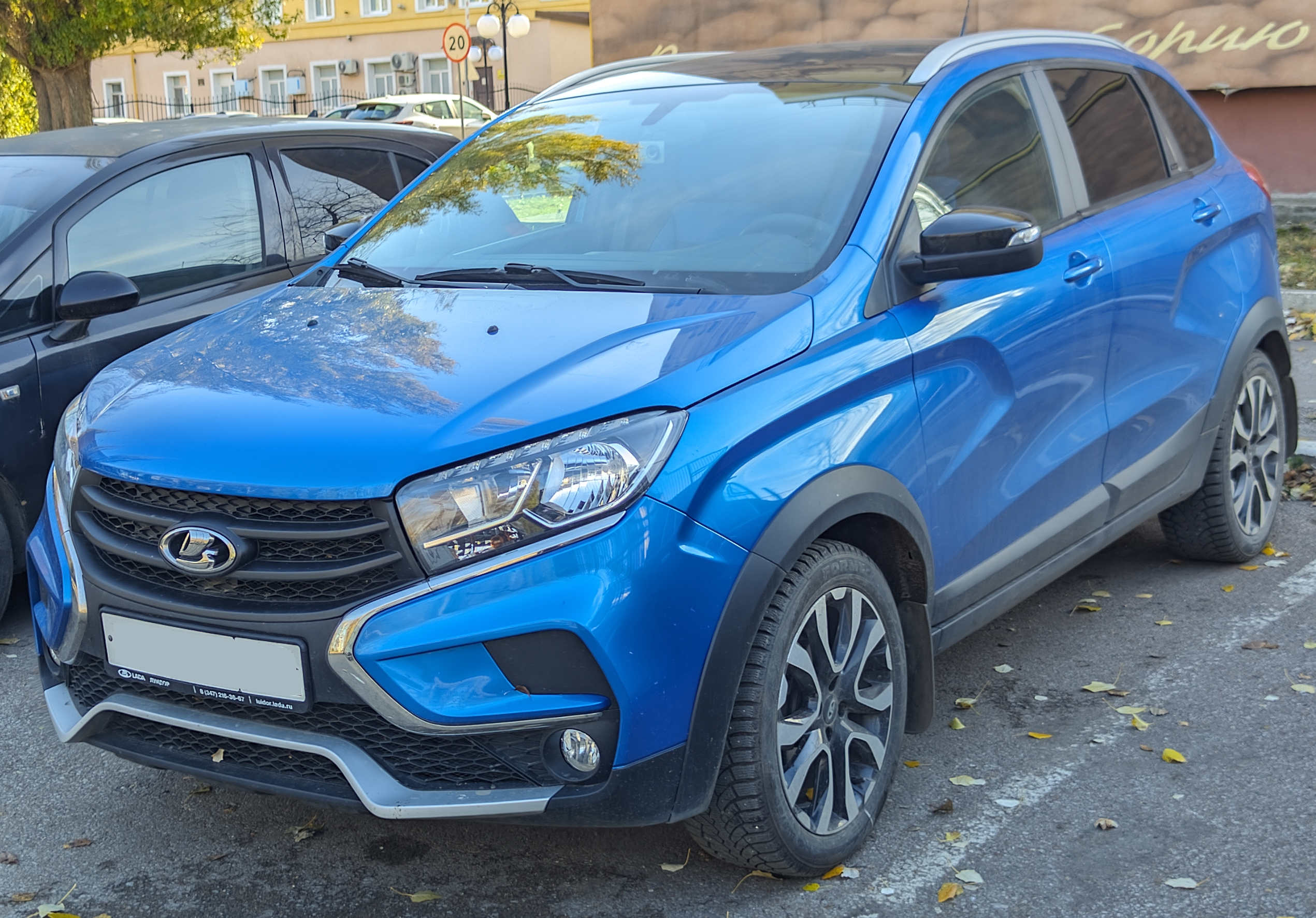
Lada XRAY

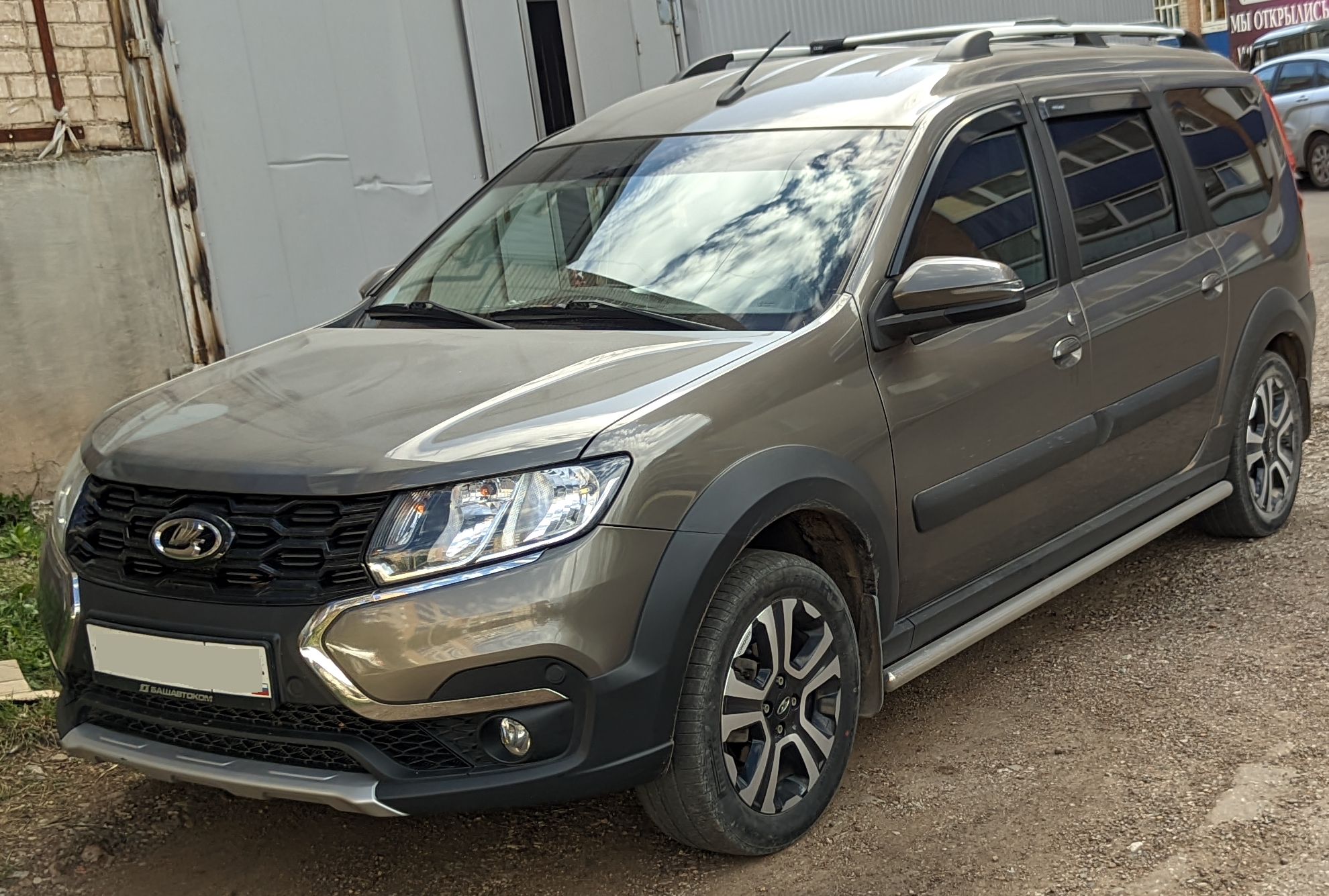
Lada Largus

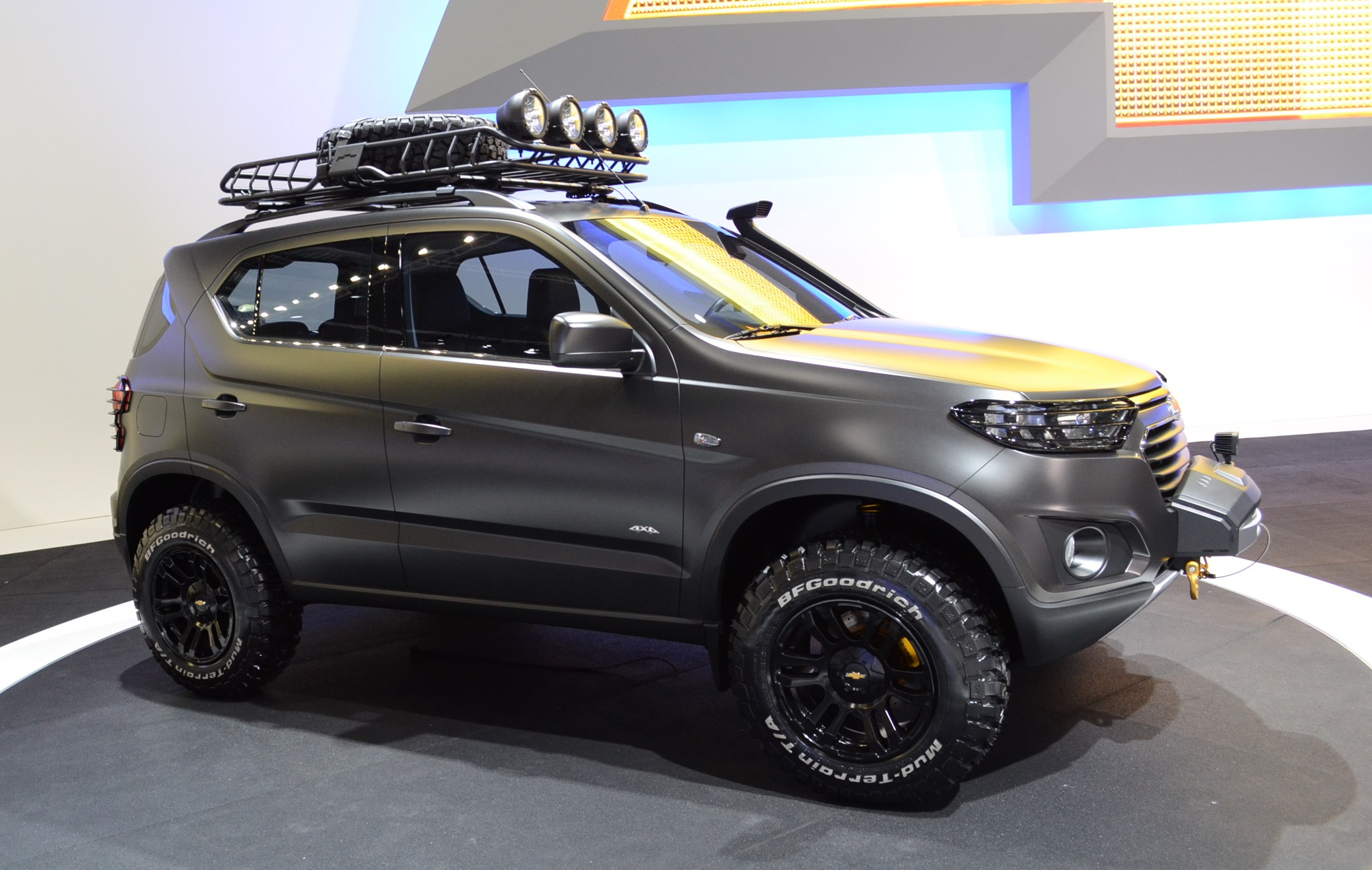
Chevrolet Niva concept

The B0 platform used by Mahindra & Mahindra for:

- Mahindra Verito Vibe
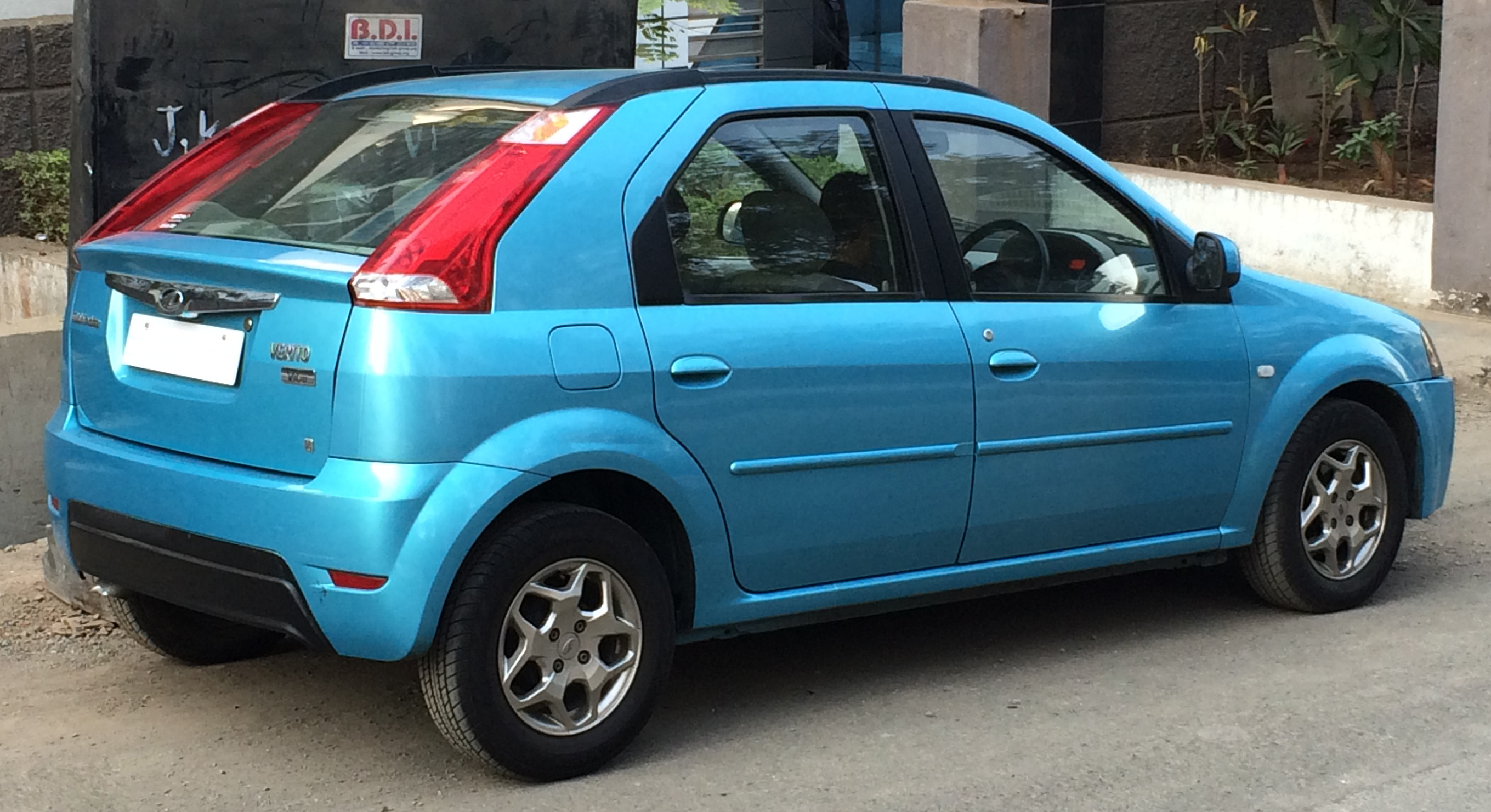
Mahindra Verito Vibe

== Dacia B0+ platform ==
The B0+ platform is used by Dacia for:

- Dacia Duster II (HM)
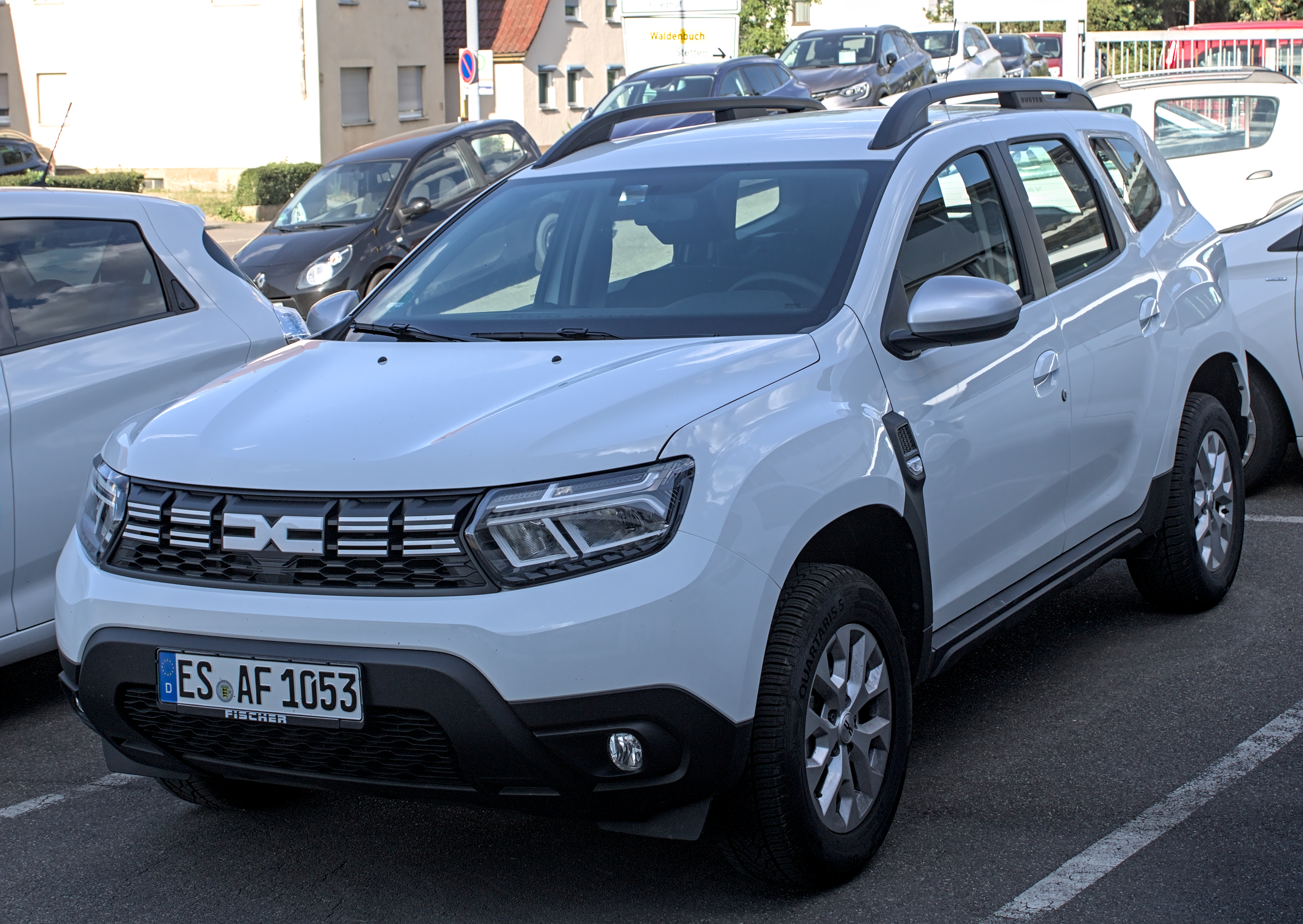
Dacia Duster II (HM)

== Dacia M0 platform ==
A development of the B0 platform, the M0 platform is used for the following cars:

- Dacia Dokker
- Dacia Lodgy
- Dacia Logan II
- Dacia Sandero II
- Renault Symbol III
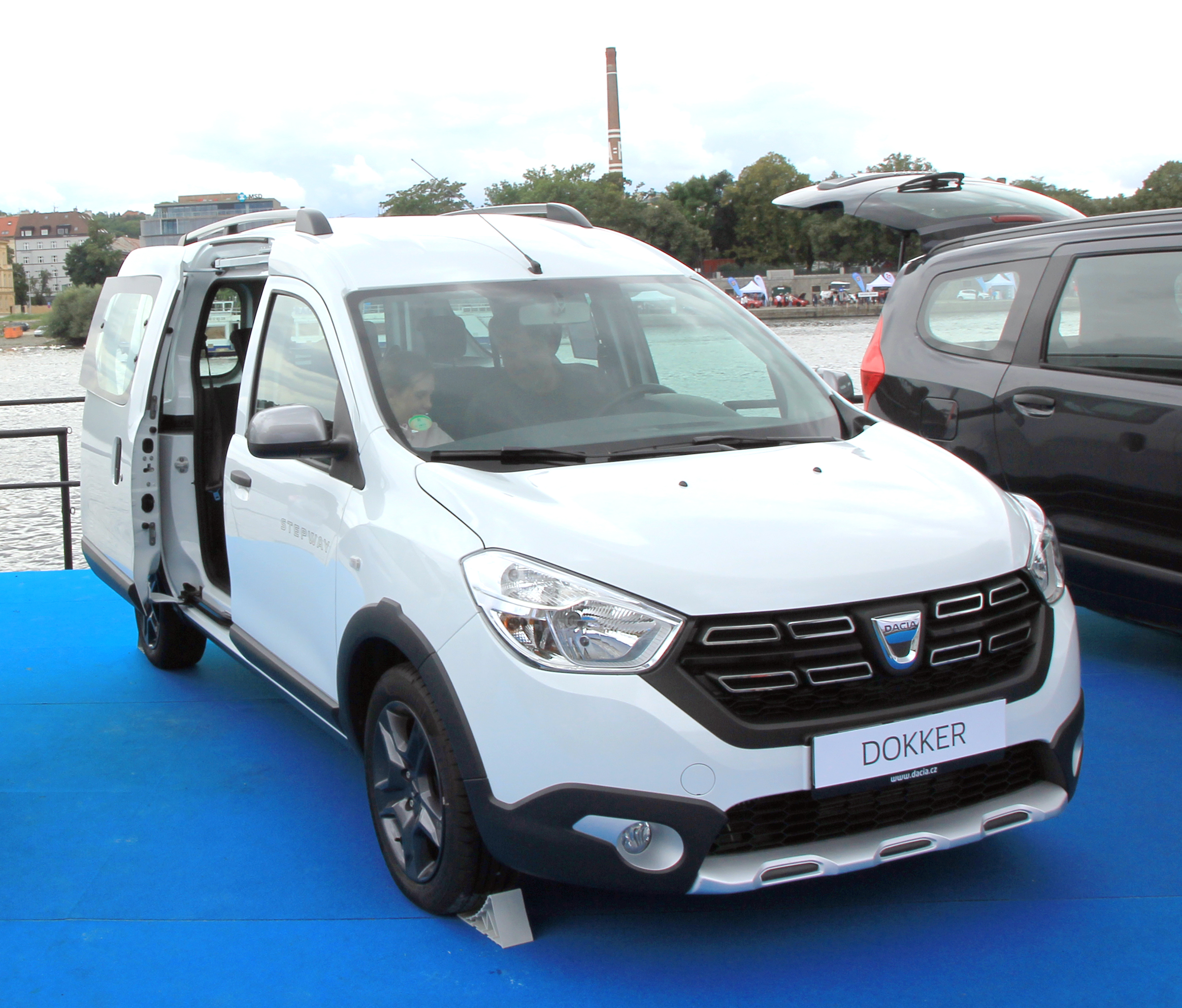
Dacia Dokker

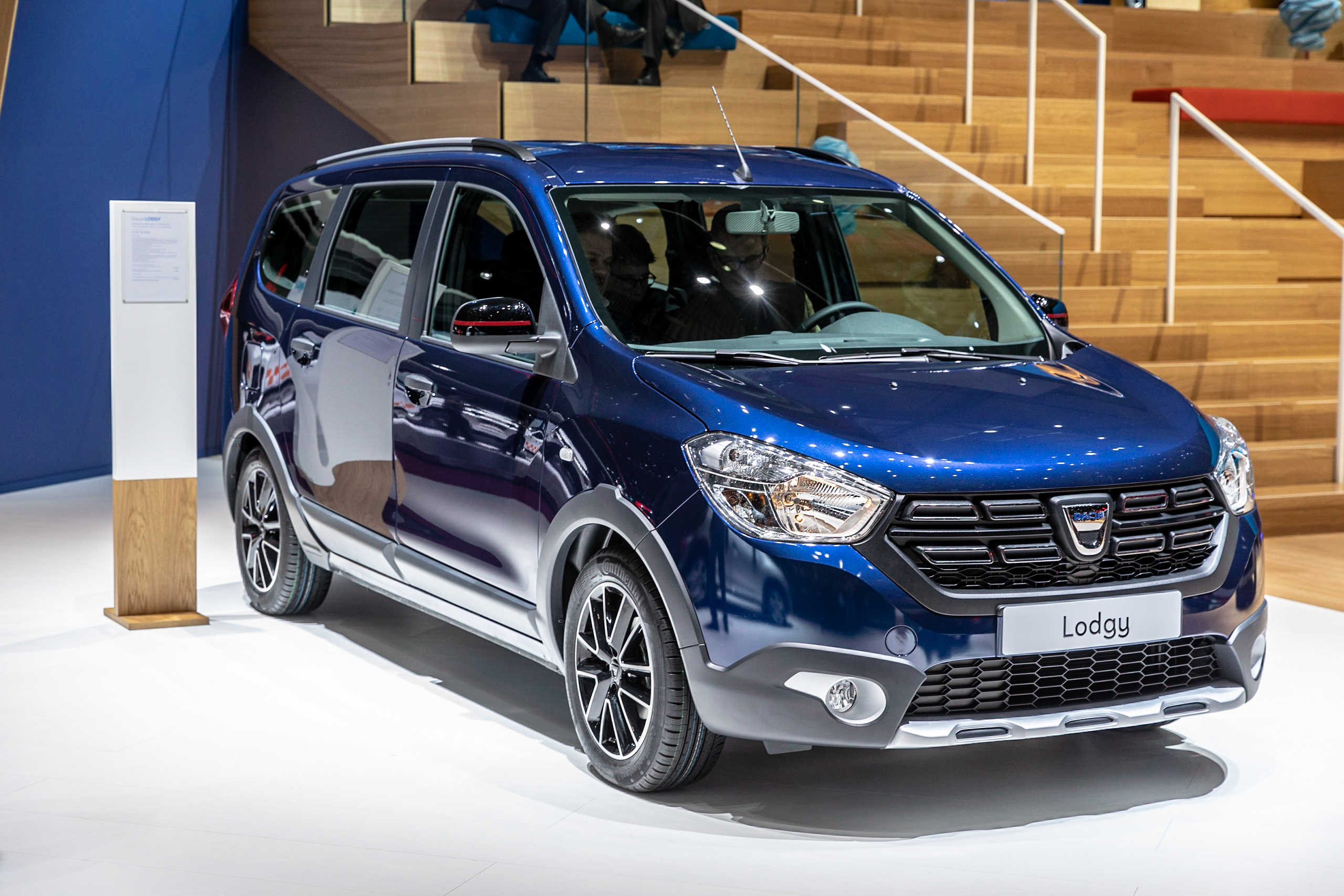
Dacia Lodgy

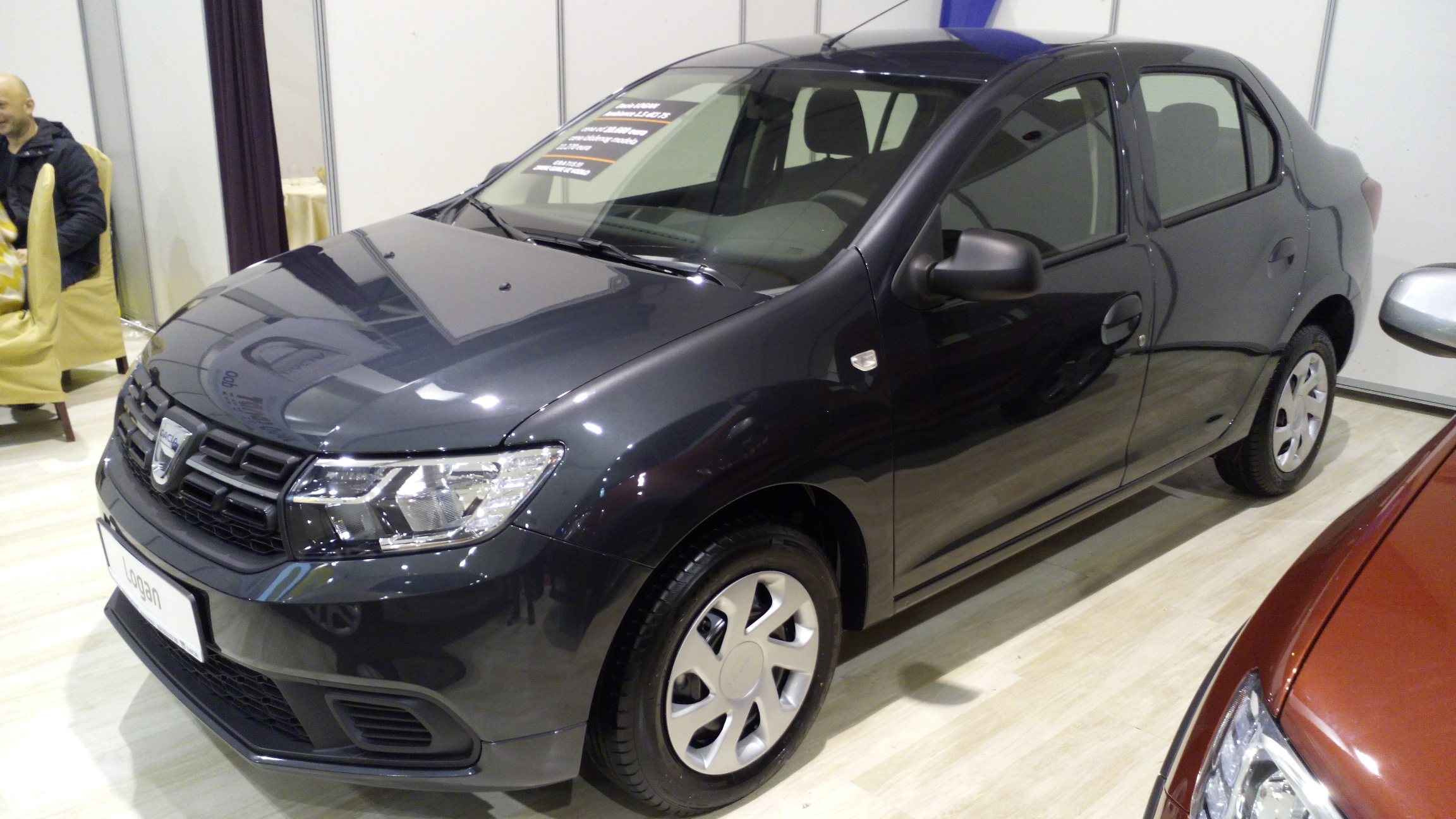
Dacia Logan II

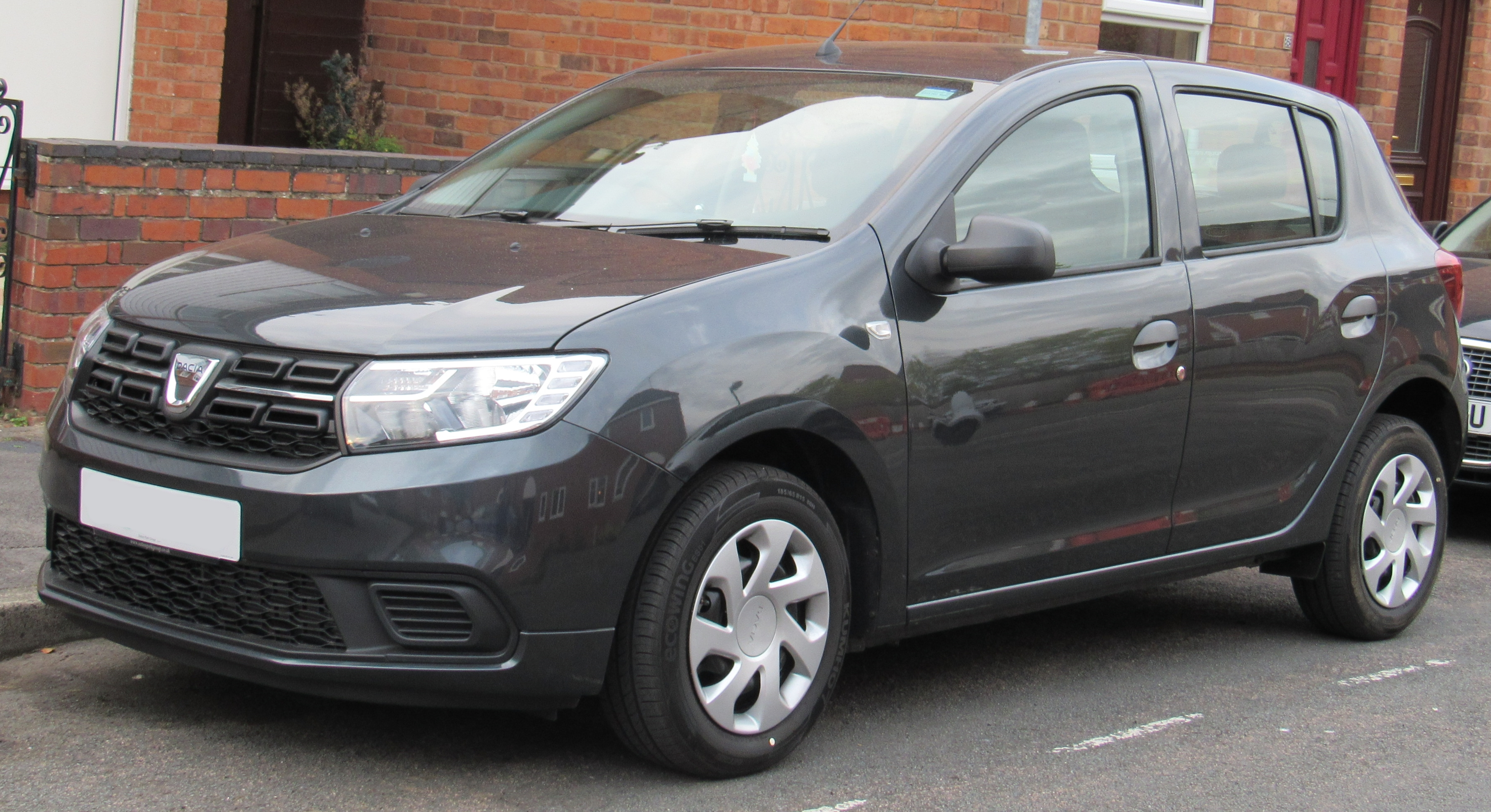
Dacia Sandero II

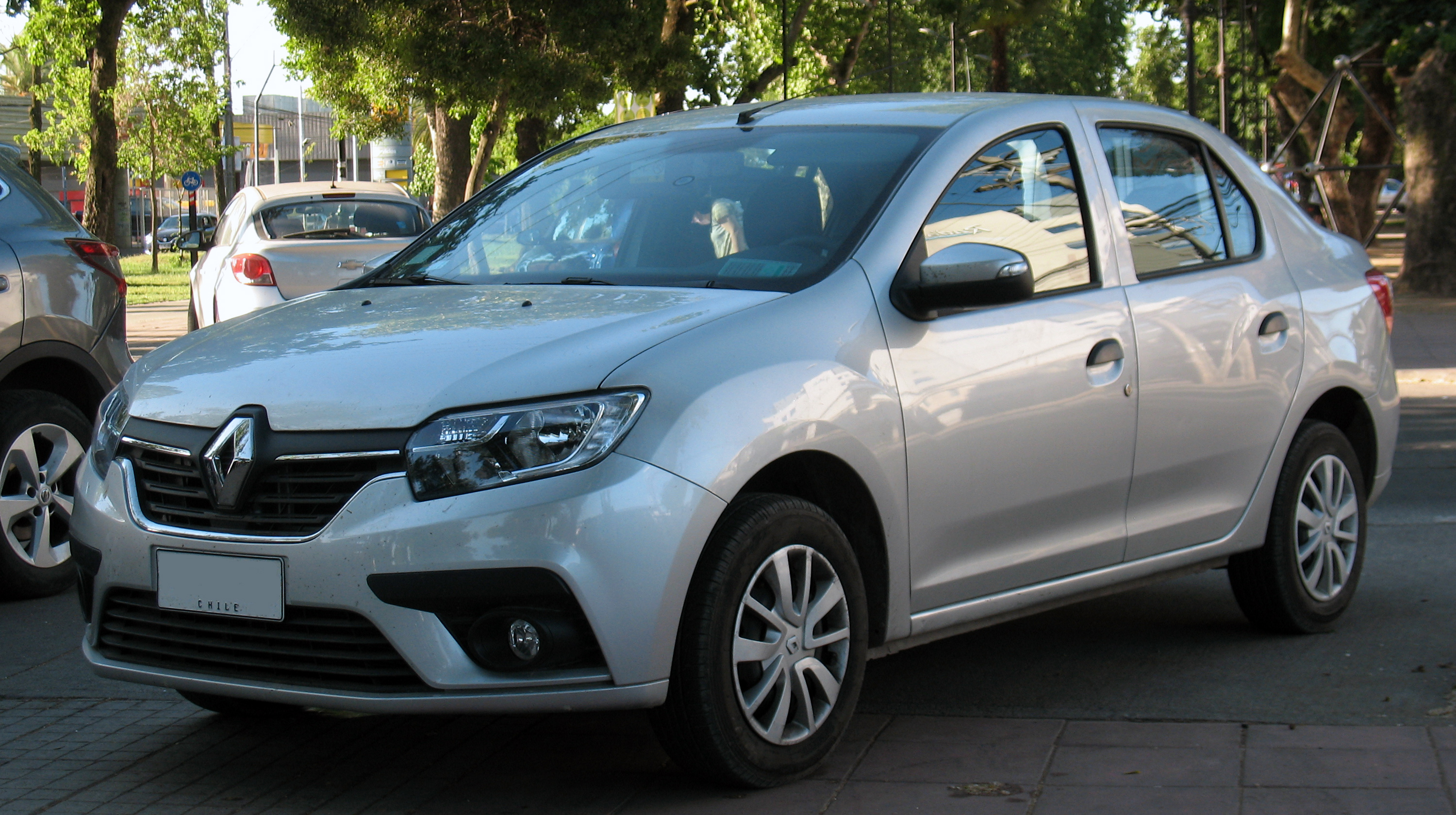
Renault Symbol III

== Nissan EV platform ==
A new electric vehicle platform, based on the B0 platform, was revealed by Nissan in 2009, though Nissan's own documentation on the B0 platform does not mention the LEAF:

- Nissan Leaf (first generation)
- Nissan e-NV200 (drivetrain, battery, electronics), body on Nissan B platform
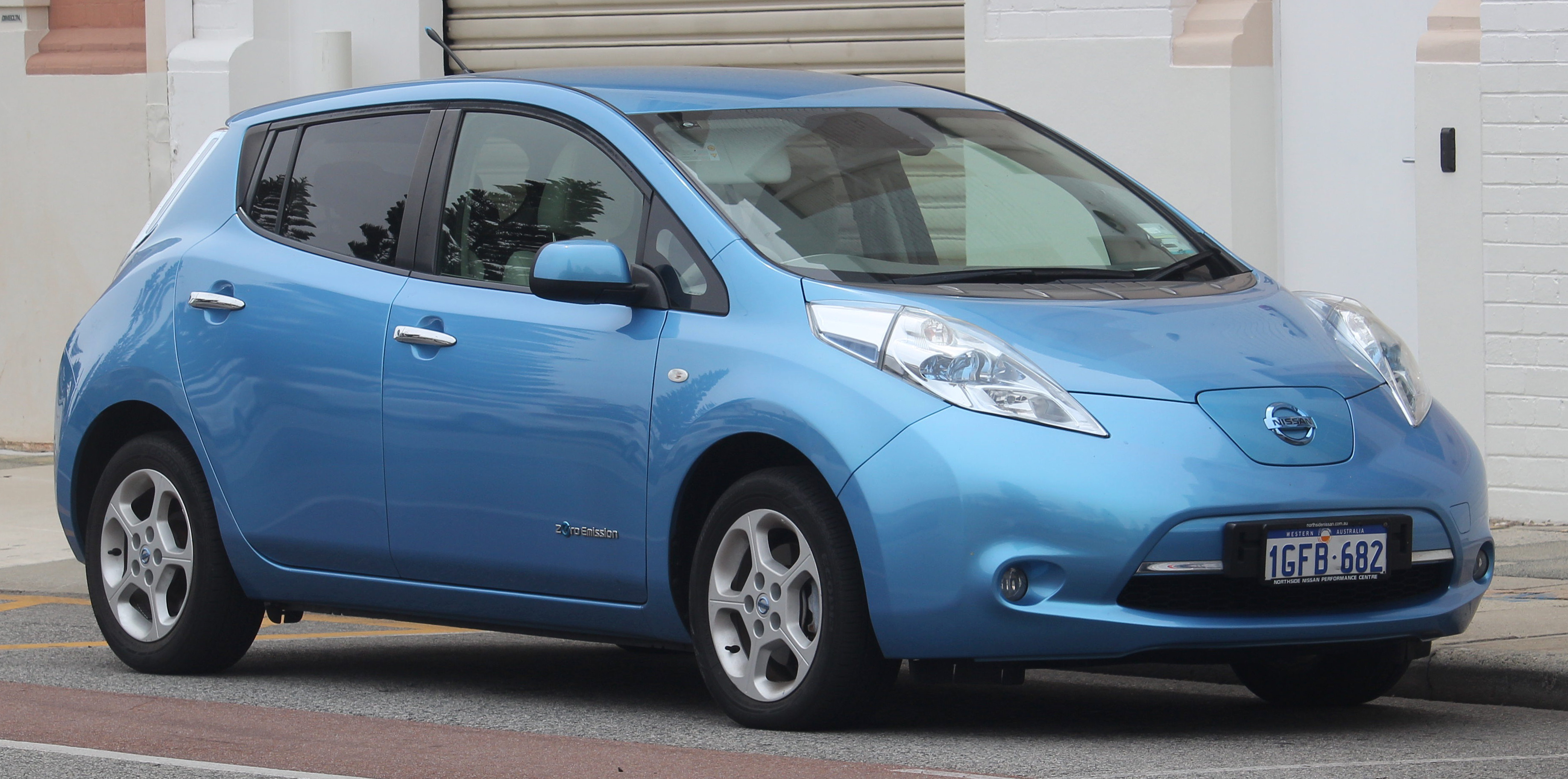
Nissan Leaf (first generation)

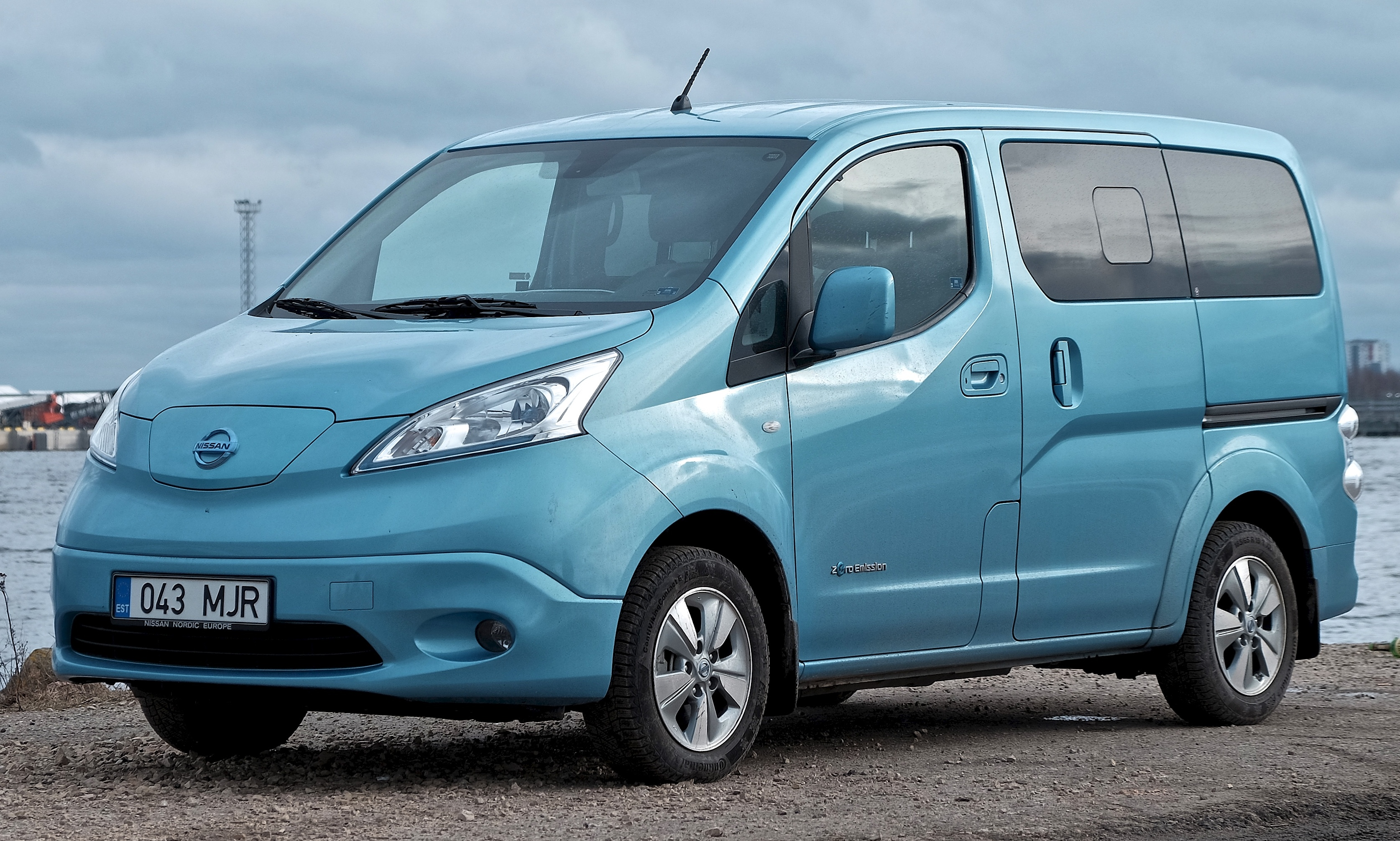
Nissan e-NV200

== Nissan V platform ==
The second generation of the B platform is now known as the V platform which supports E-power hybrid powertrain and used for the following cars:

- 2010 Nissan Micra (K13)
- 2011 Nissan Latio/Almera/Sunny/Versa (N17)
- 2011 Nissan Tiida/Pulsar (C12)
- 2012 Nissan Sylphy/Sentra/Pulsar (B17)
- 2012 Nissan Invitation concept car
- 2012 Nissan Note (E12)
- 2014 Venucia R30
- 2014 Datsun Go (AD0)
- 2014 Datsun Go+ (AD0)
- 2018 Datsun Cross (AD0)
- 2016 Nissan Kicks (P15)
- 2017 Nissan Micra (K14)
- 2017 Venucia D60
- 2019 Nissan Almera/Versa/Sunny (N18)
- 2026 Nissan Kait
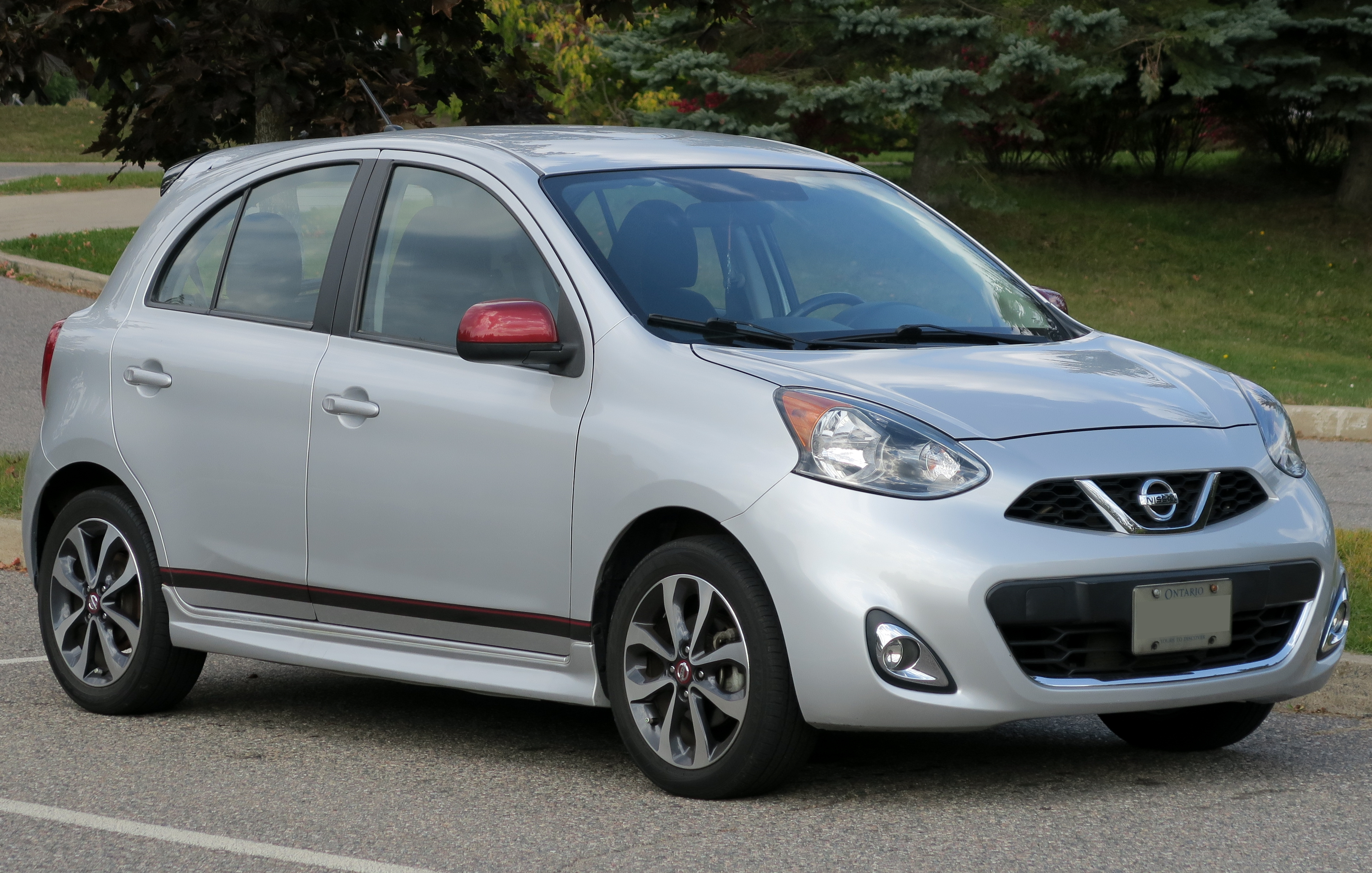
Nissan Micra (K13)

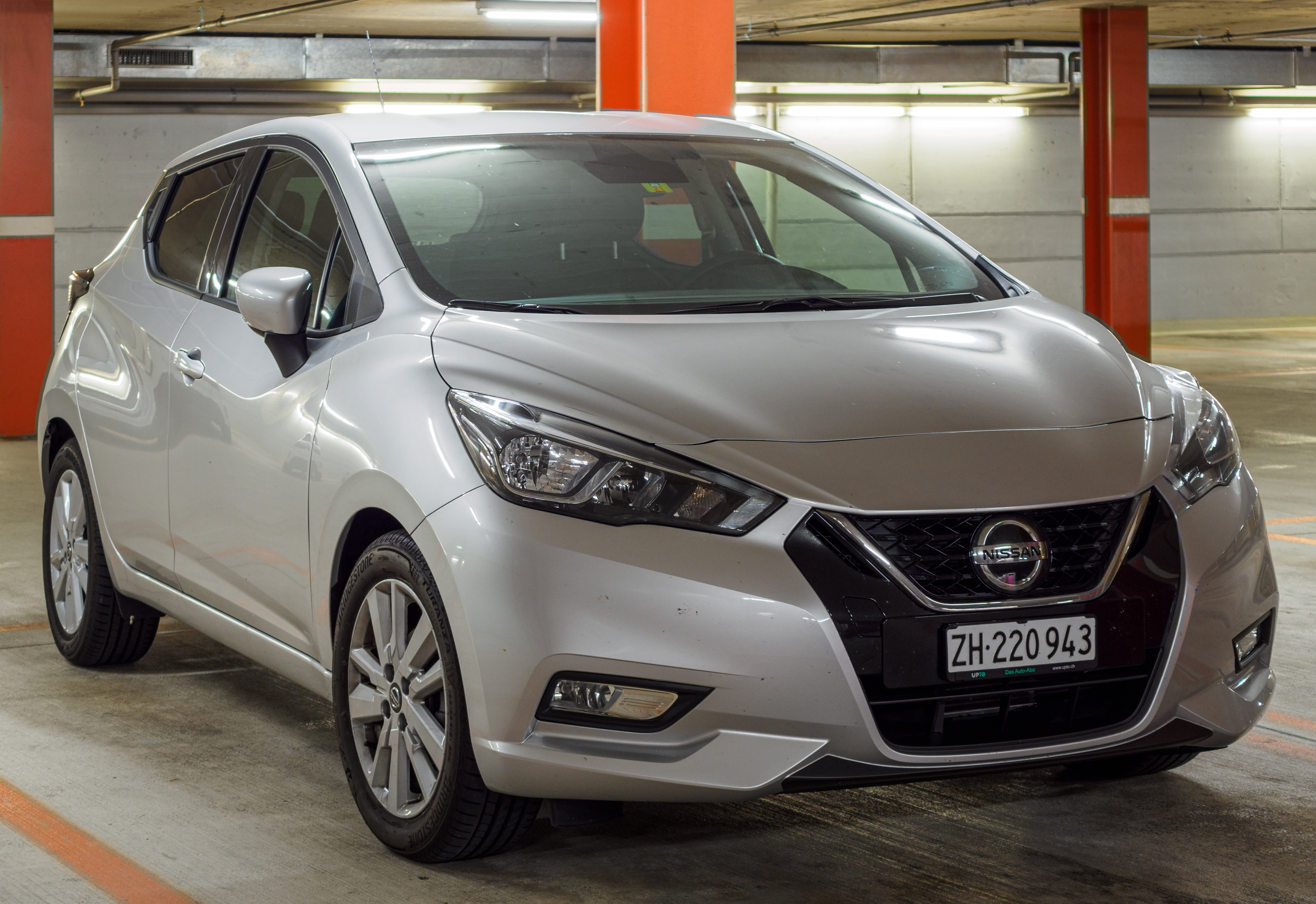
Nissan Micra (K14)

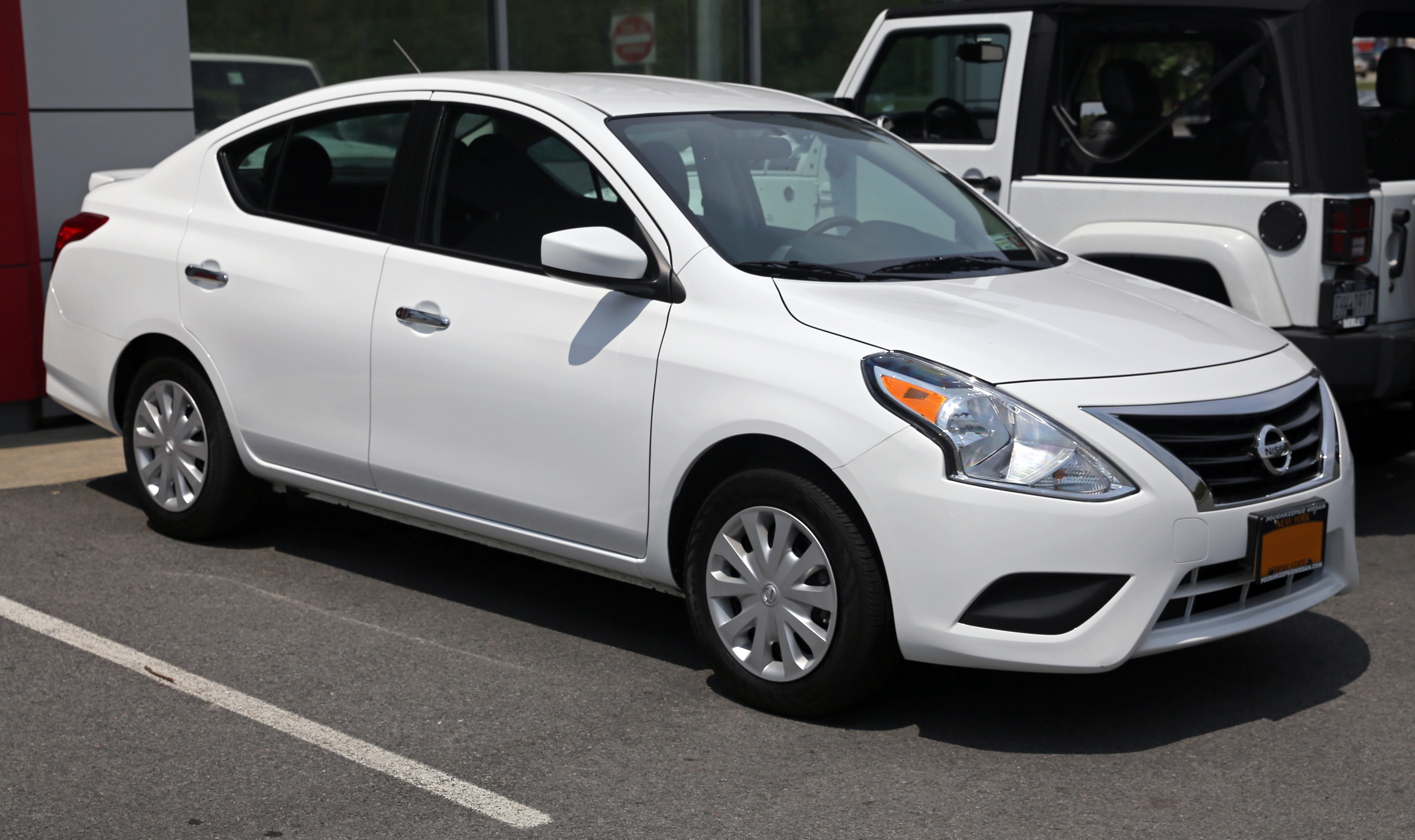
Nissan Latio/Almera/Sunny/Versa (N17)

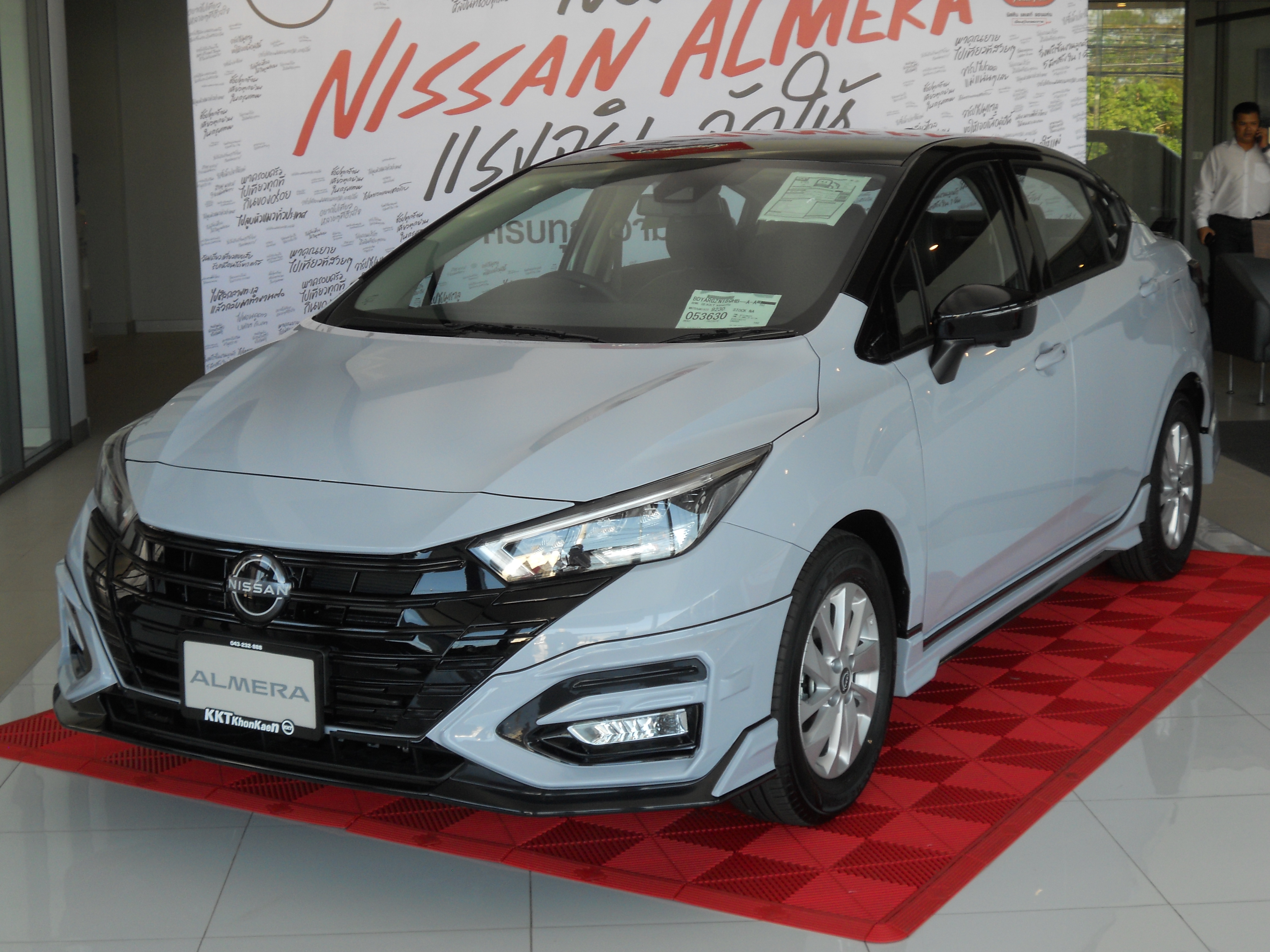
Nissan Almera/Versa/Sunny (N18)

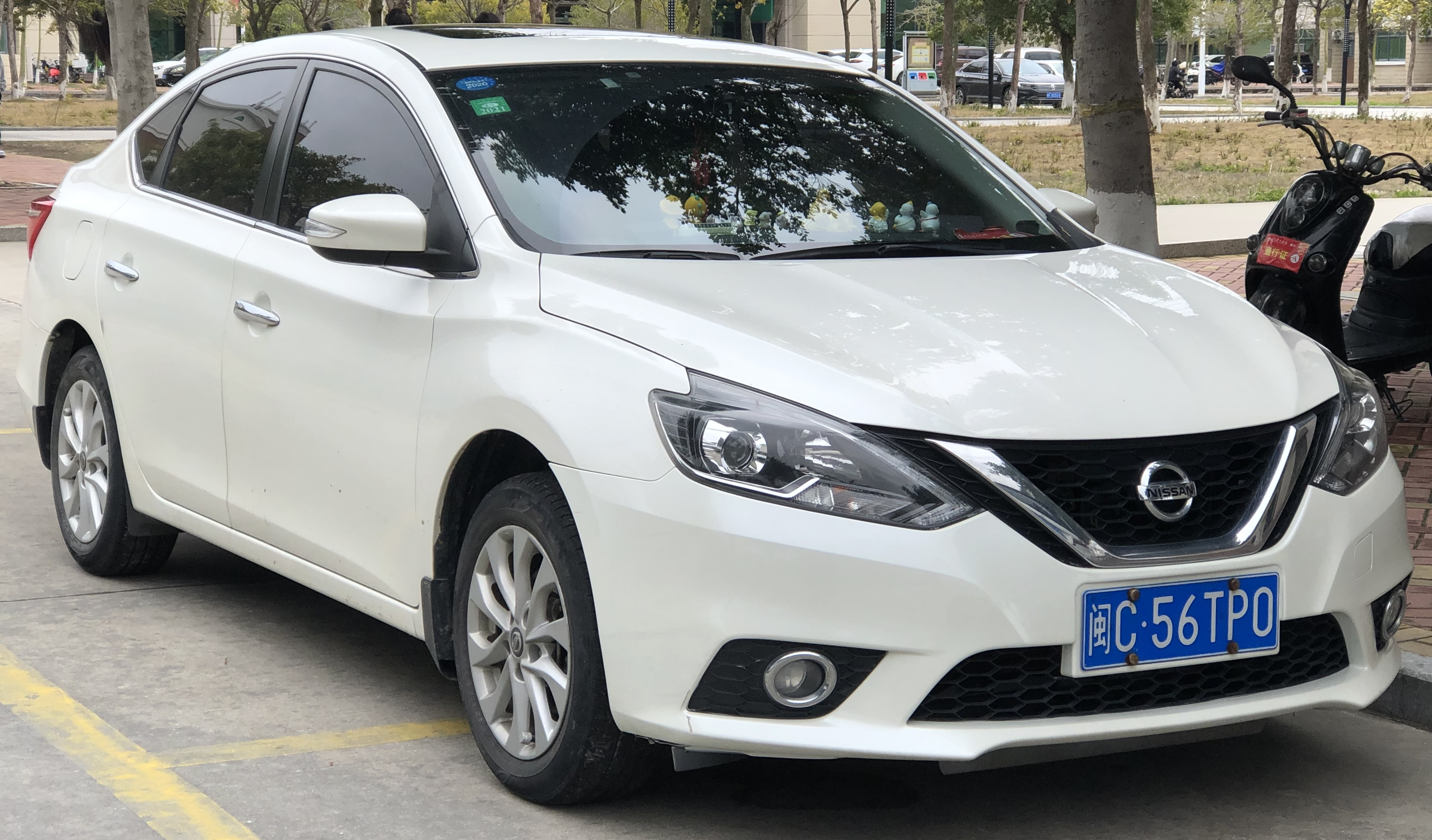
Nissan Sylphy/Sentra/Pulsar (B17)

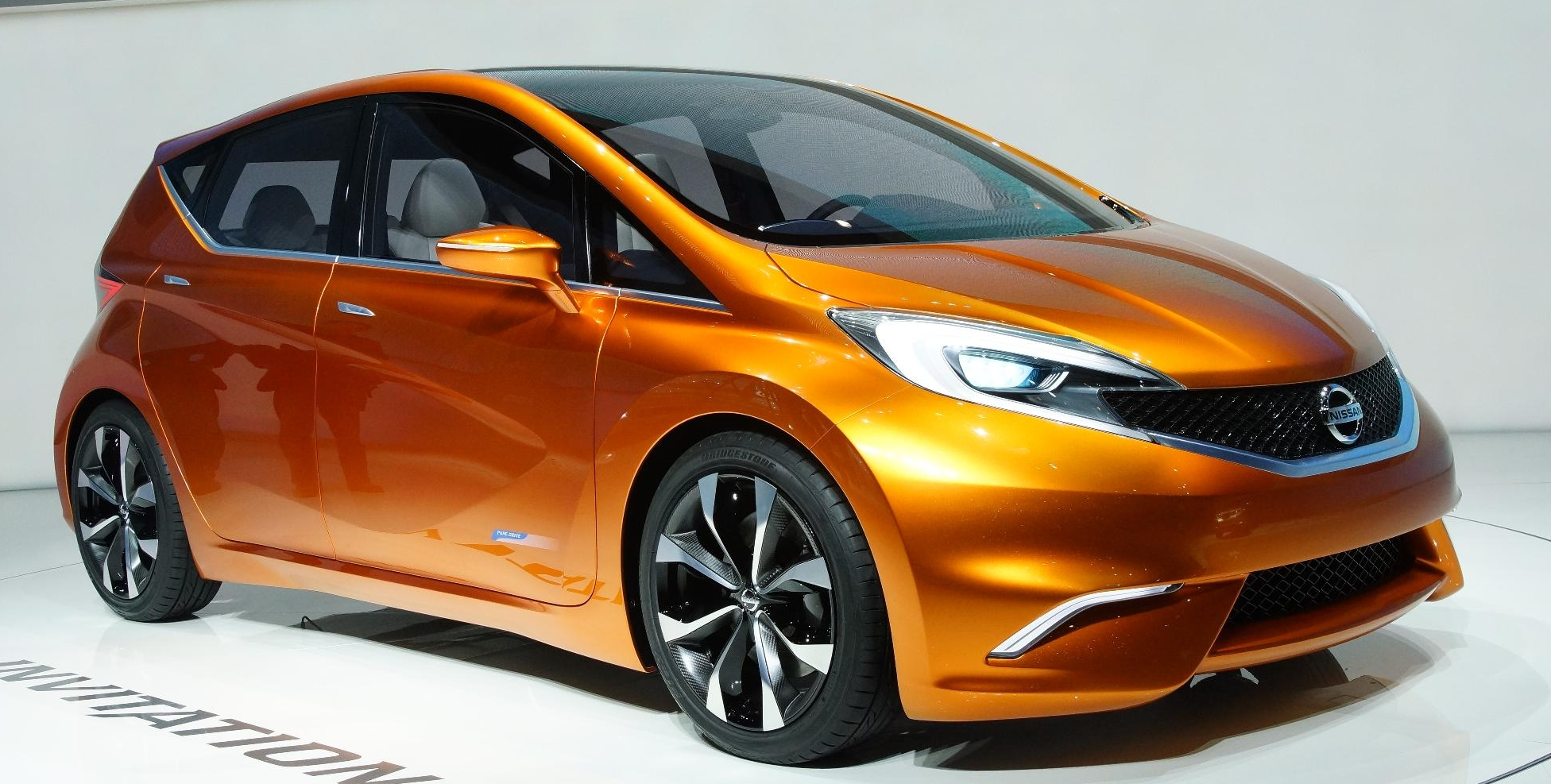
Nissan Invitation concept car

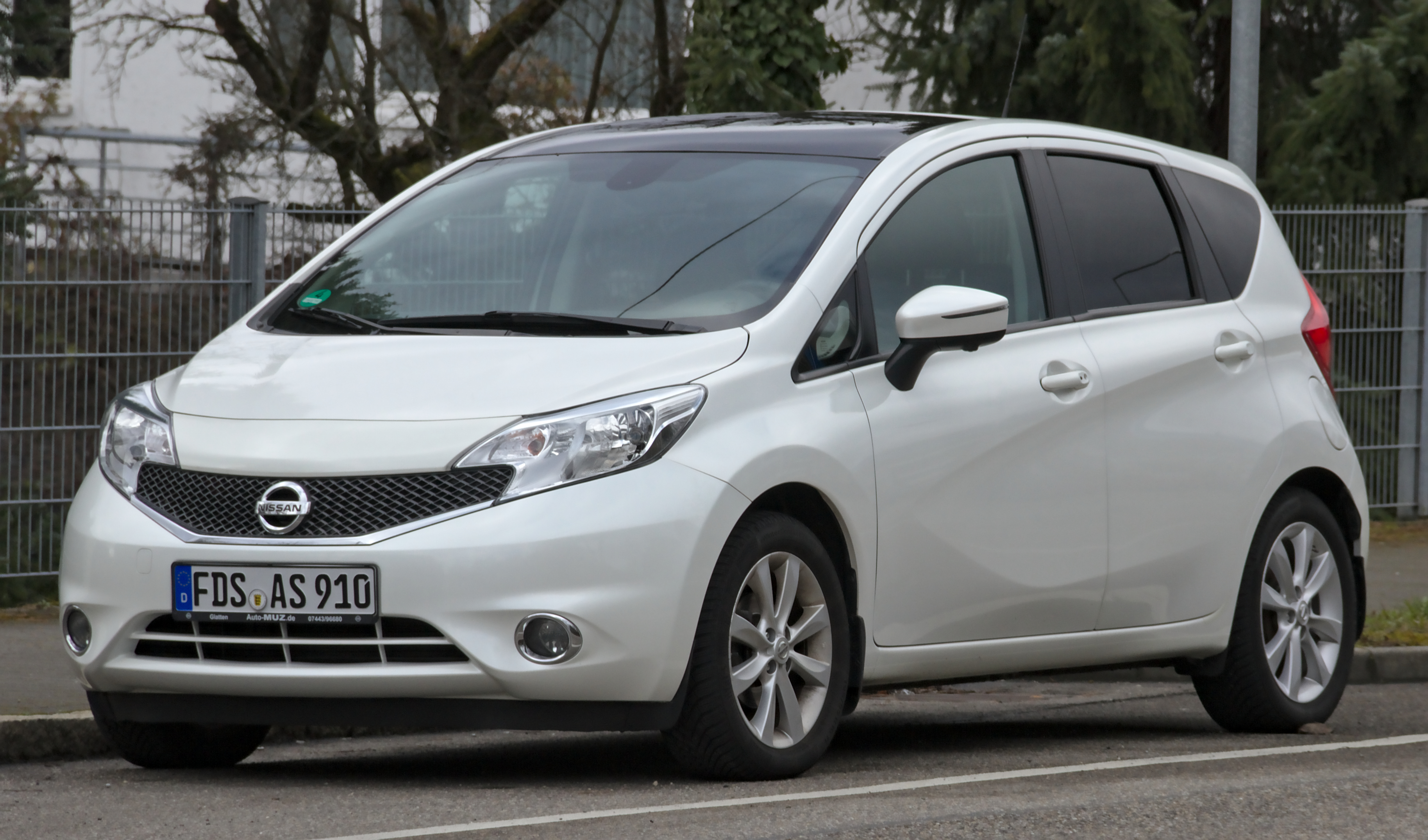
Nissan Note (E12)

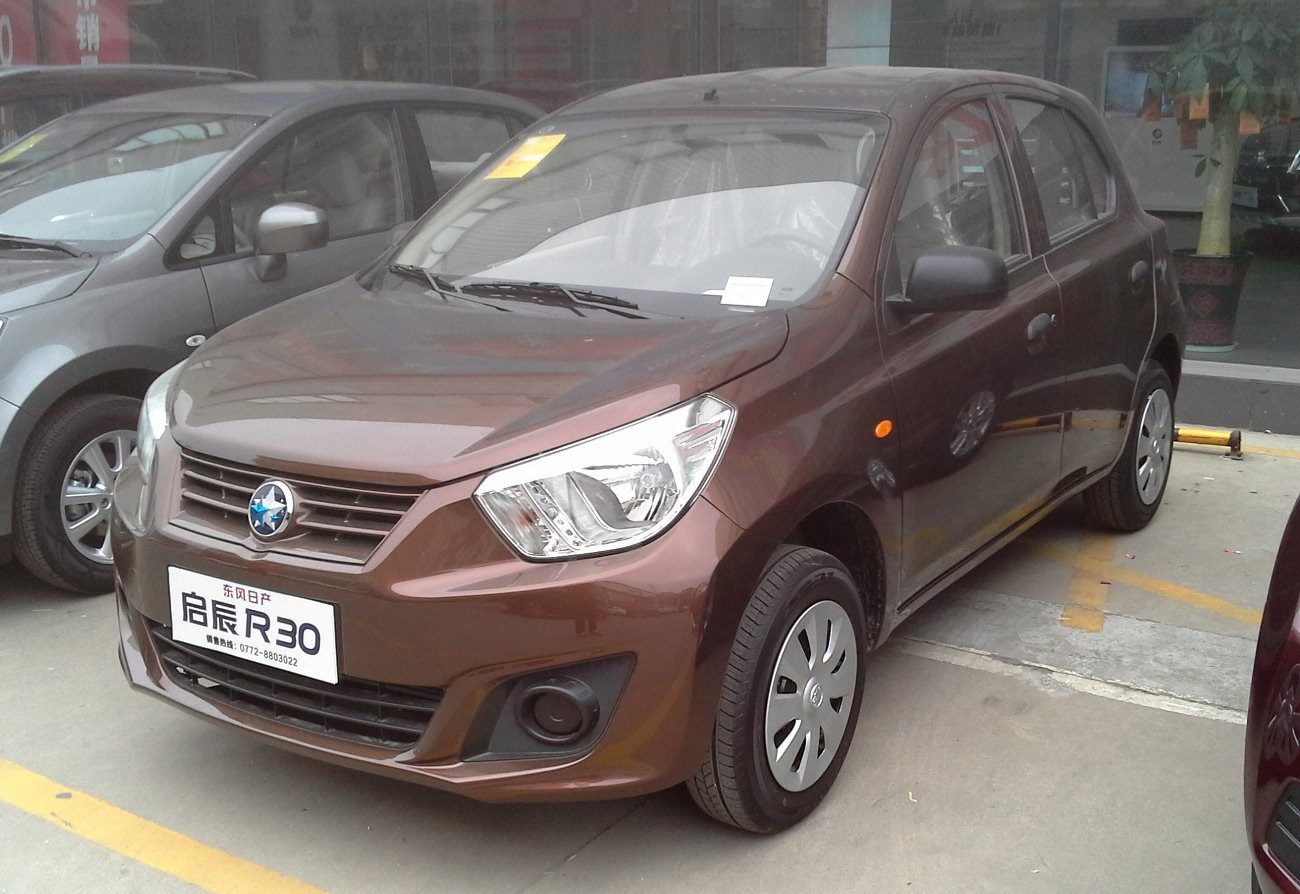
Venucia R30

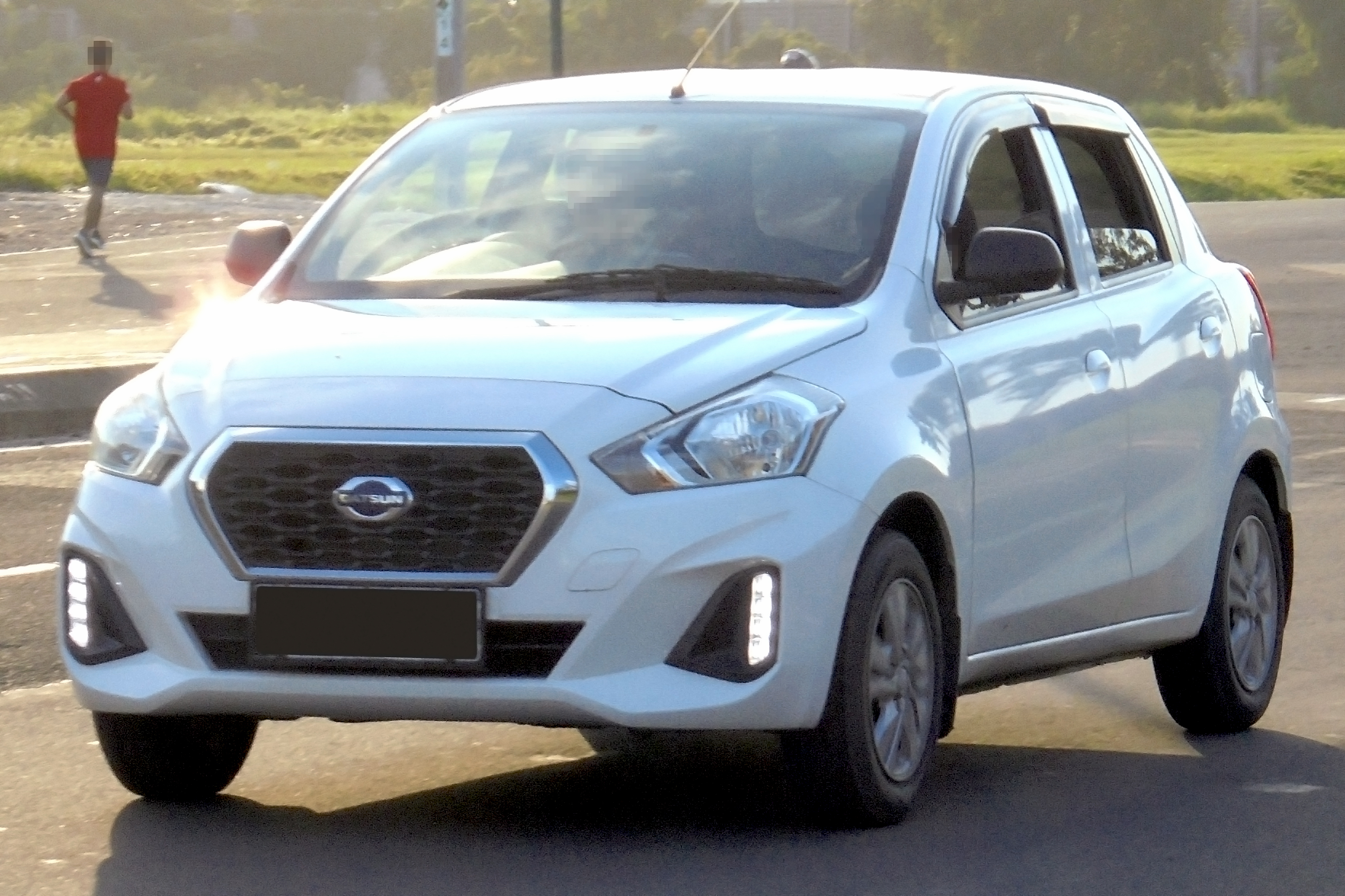
Datsun Go (AD0)

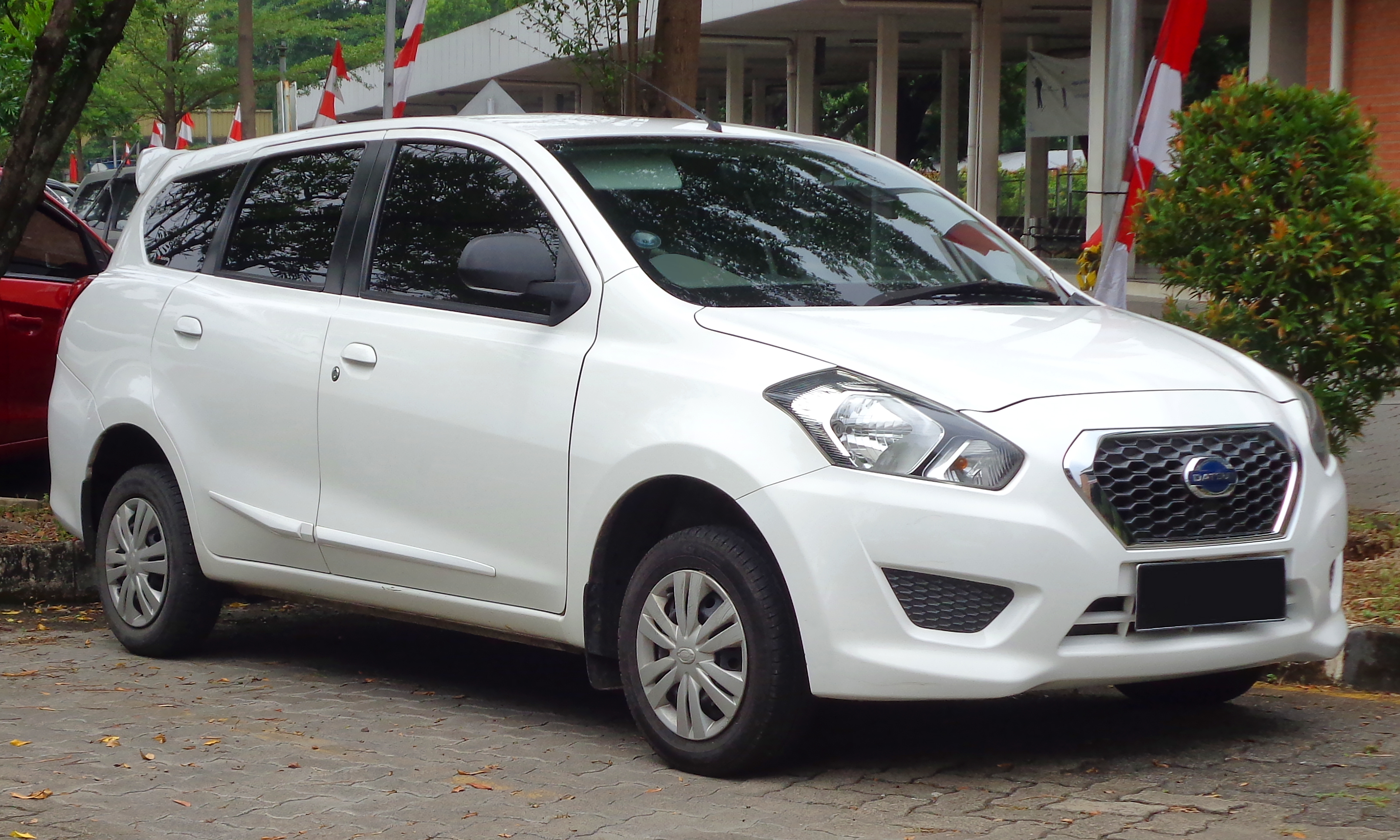
Datsun Go+ (AD0)

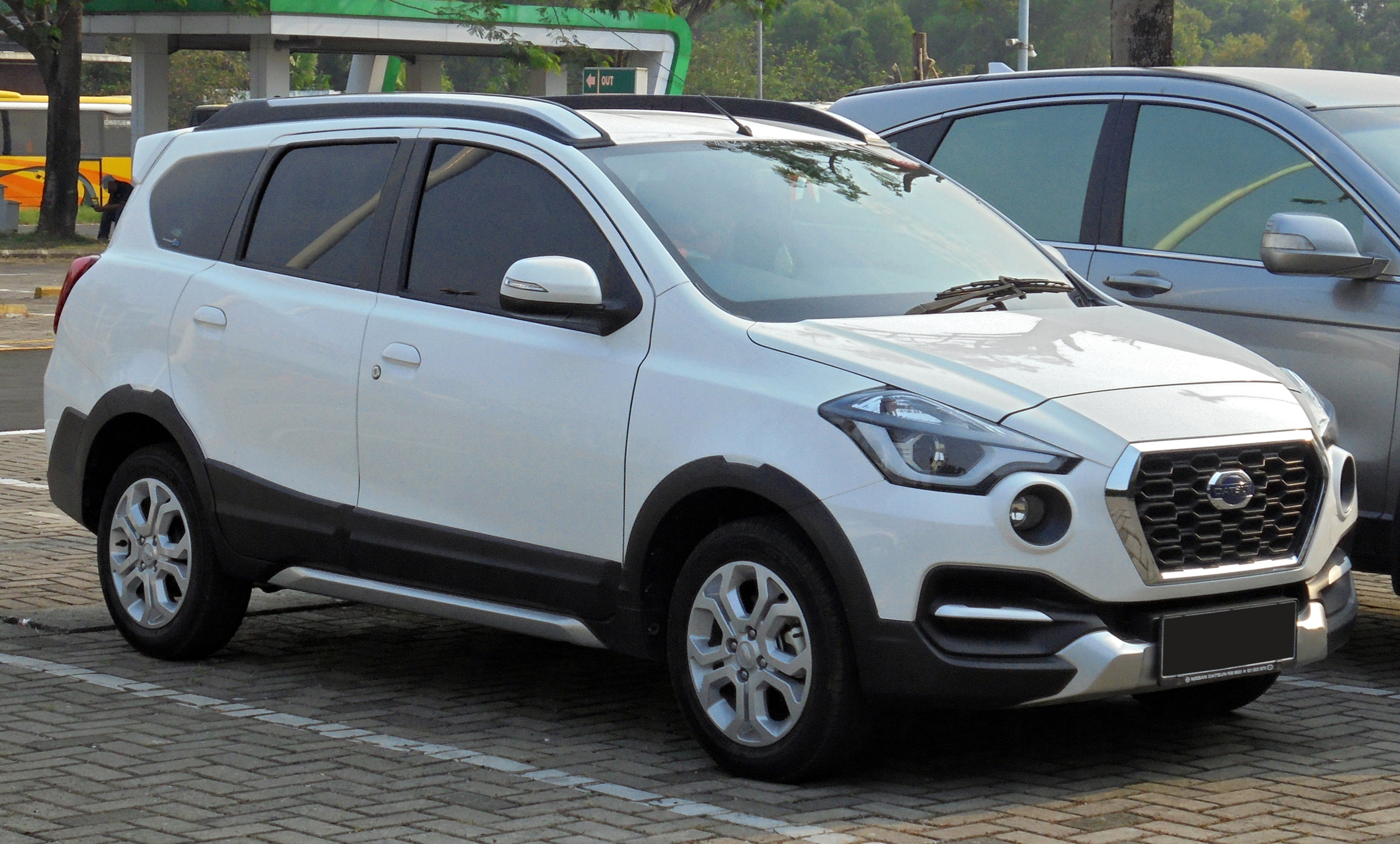
Datsun Cross (AD0)

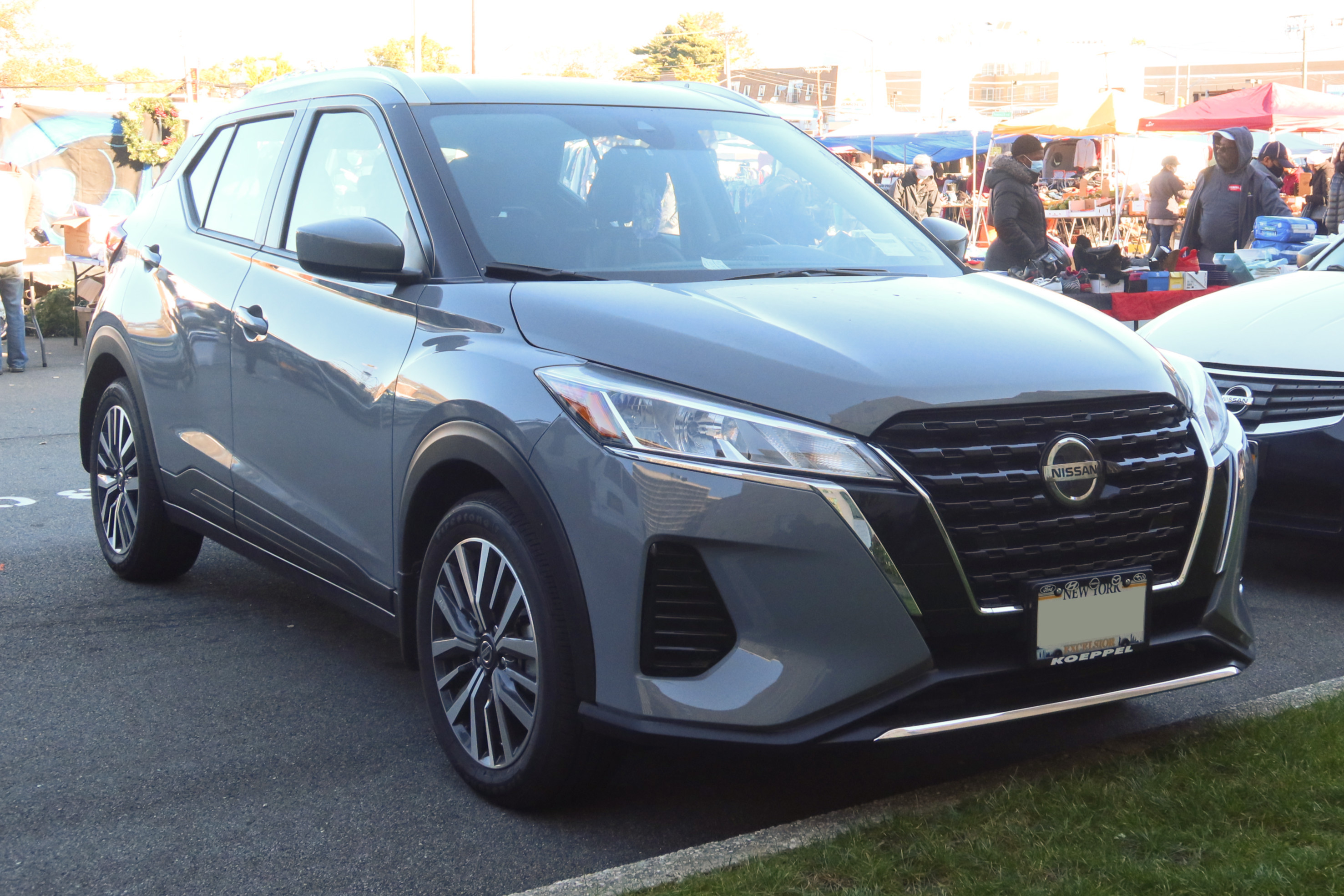
Nissan Kicks (P15)

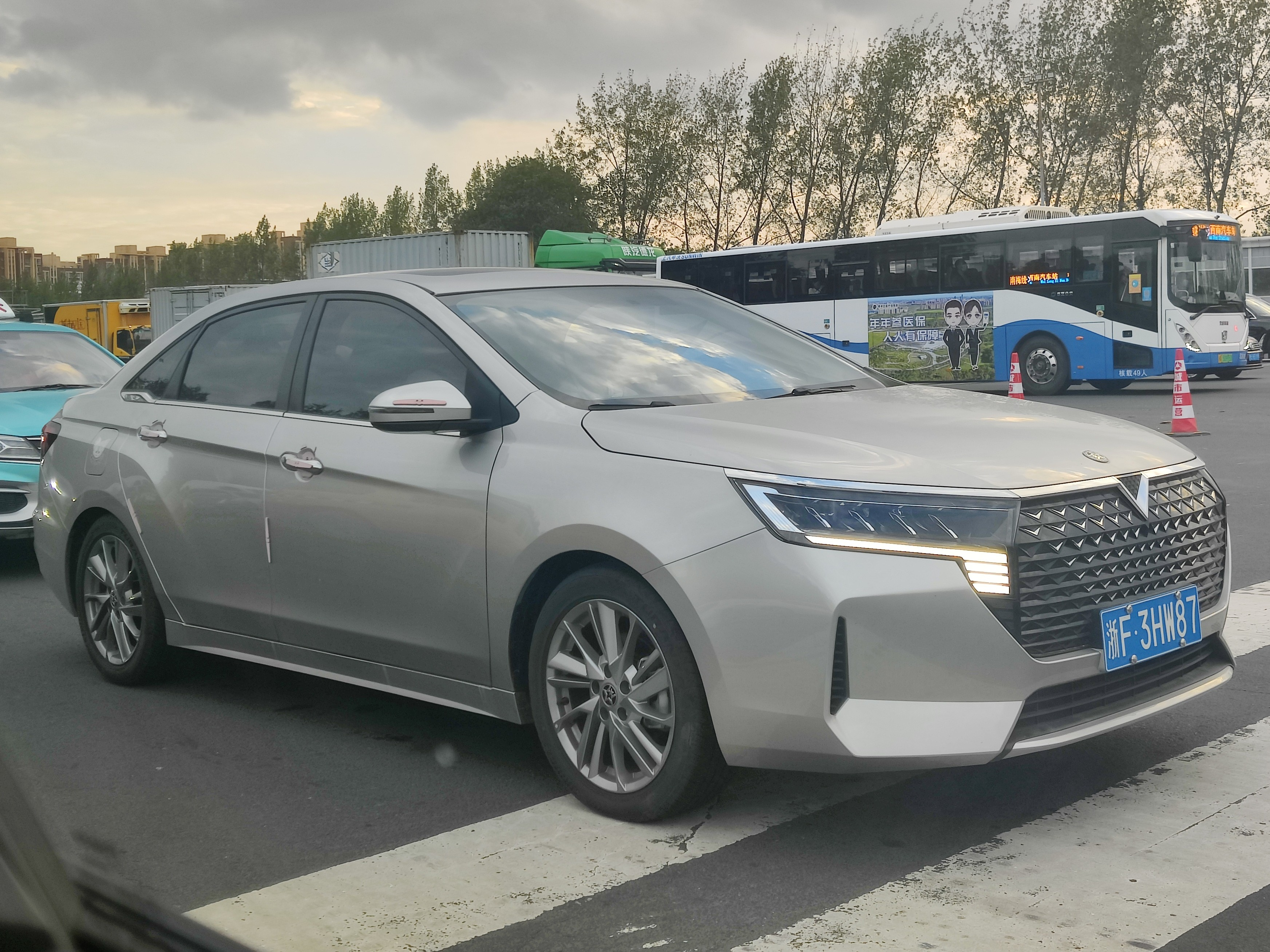
Venucia D60
