= Dacia Sandero =

Subcompact car produced by Renault and Dacia

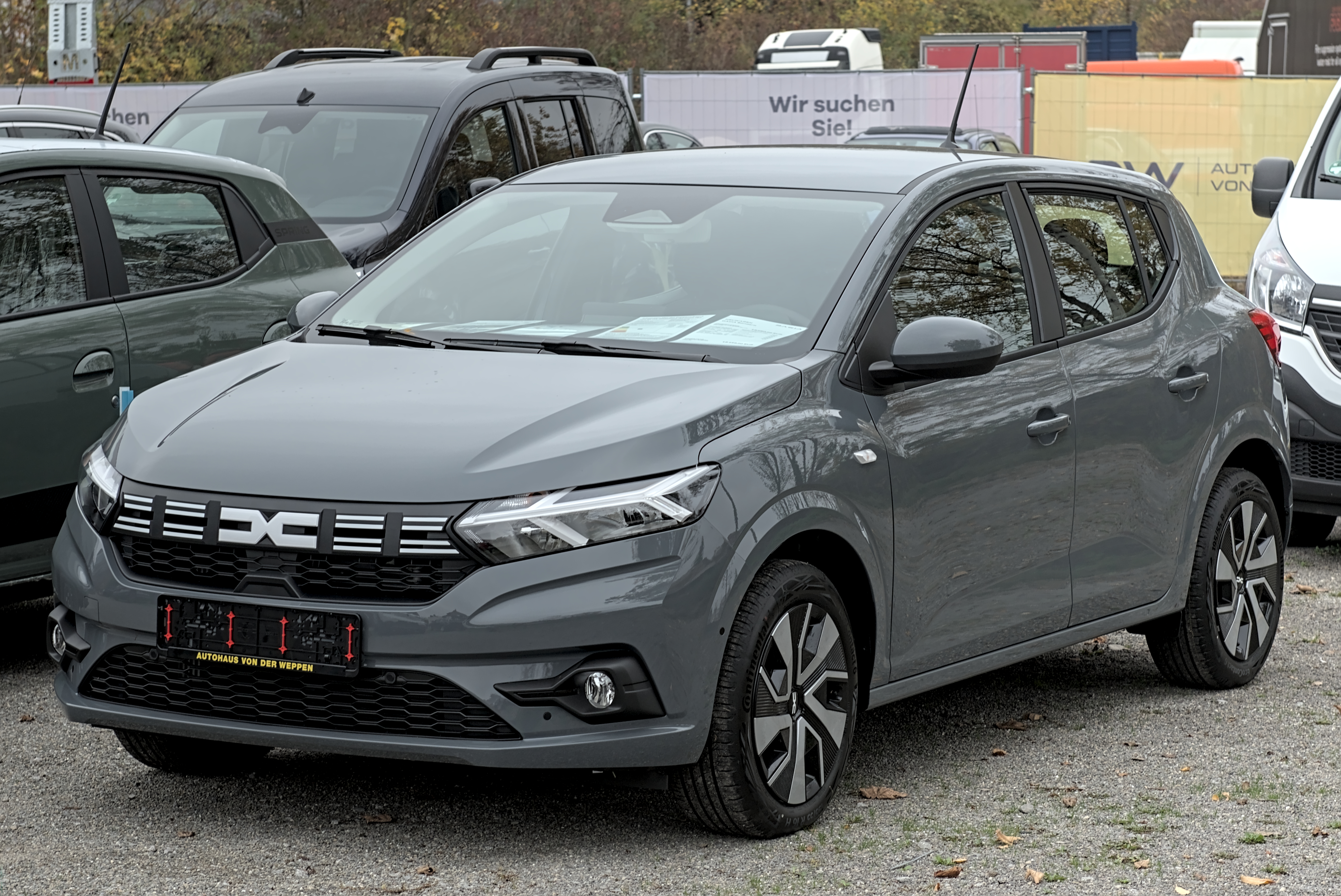

Overview
- Manufacturer: Dacia (Renault)
- Also called: Renault Sandero
- Production: 2008–present

Body and chassis
- Class: Subcompact car/supermini (B)
- Body style: 5-door hatchback
- Layout: Front-engine, front-wheel-drive

The Dacia Sandero is a subcompact car/supermini (B-segment) car produced and marketed jointly by the French manufacturer Renault and its Romanian subsidiary Dacia since 2007, currently at its third generation. It has been also marketed as the Renault Sandero in certain markets, such as Russia, Latin America, Iran, Egypt, and Sub-Saharan Africa. The Dacia Sandero has been Europe's best selling car several years in a row.

== First generation (B90; 2008) ==
Sandero I
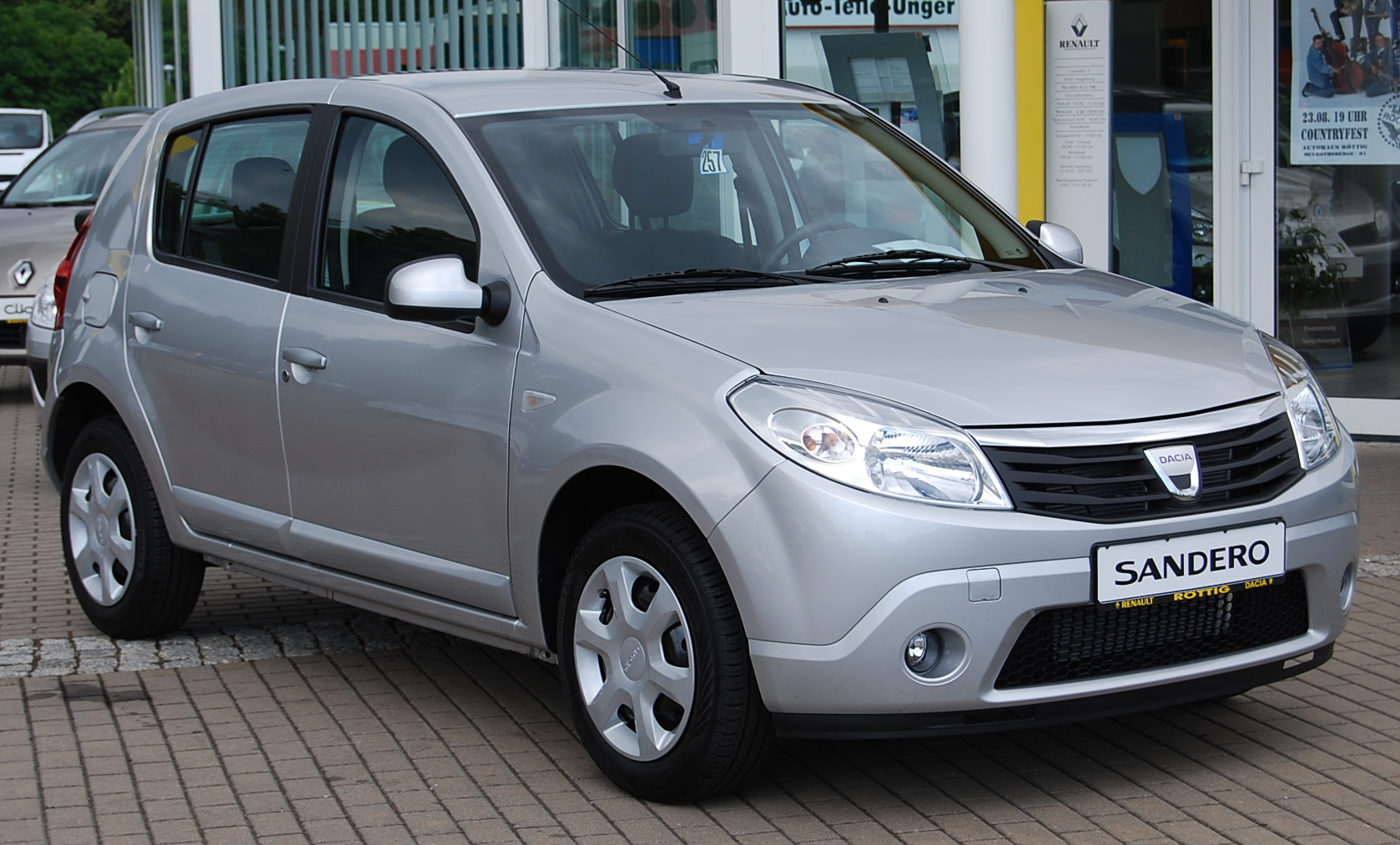

Overview
- Also called: Renault Sandero; Renault Sandero Stepway
- Production: 2007–2014 (Brazil); 2008–2012 (Romania); 2008–2015 (Colombia); 2015–2019 (Iran)
- Assembly: Romania: Mioveni; Brazil: São José dos Pinhais (Renault Brazil); Colombia: Envigado (Sofasa); Morocco: Casablanca (Somaca); Russia: Moscow (Avtoframos); South Africa: Rosslyn, Gauteng (Nissan South Africa) (Note: Nissan is the partner of Renault in the Renault–Nissan Alliance.); Iran: Tehran (Pars Khodro)
- Designer: Renault Design Barcelona

Body and chassis
- Platform: Dacia B0 platform
- Related: Dacia Logan; Dacia Duster; Renault Clio III

Powertrain
- Engine: Petrol: 1.2 L D4F 16V I4; 1.4 L K7J 8V I4; 1.6 L K7M 8V I4; 1.6 L K4M 16V I4; Petrol flex-fuel: 1.0 L D4D 16V I4; 1.6 L K4M 16V I4; Petrol LPG: 1.4 L K7J 8V I4; Diesel: 1.5 L K9K dCi i4
- Transmission: 5-speed manual 4-speed automatic (Note: Available in certain markets only, such as Brazil, Colombia, Mexico and Russia.)

Dimensions
- Wheelbase: 2,589 mm (101.9 in)
- Length: 4,020–4,091 mm (158.3–161.1 in)
- Width: 1,746–1,753 mm (68.7–69.0 in)
- Height: 1,534–1,590 mm (60.4–62.6 in)
- Curb weight: 1,025–1,204 kg (2,260–2,654 lb)

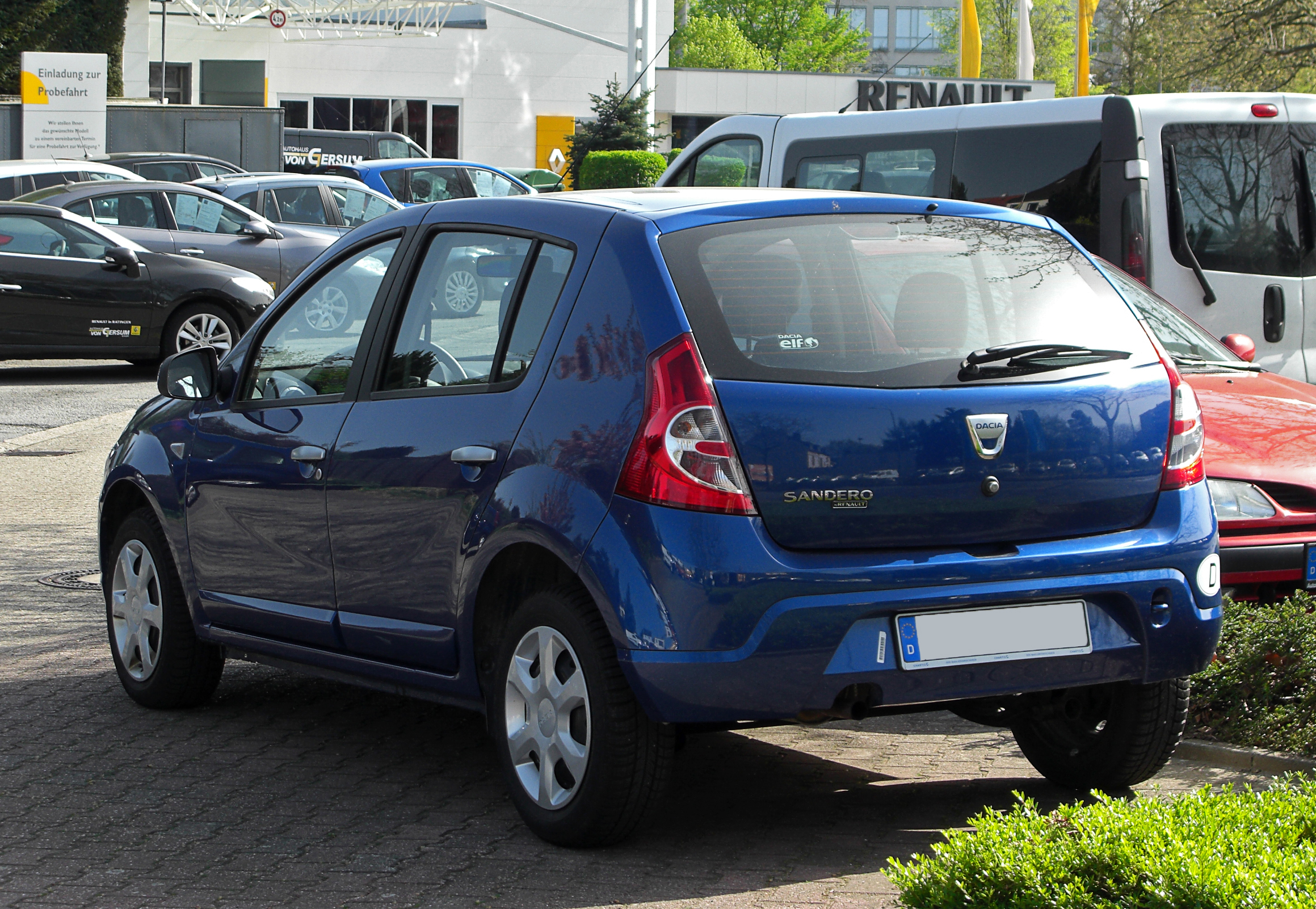
Dacia Sandero rear view

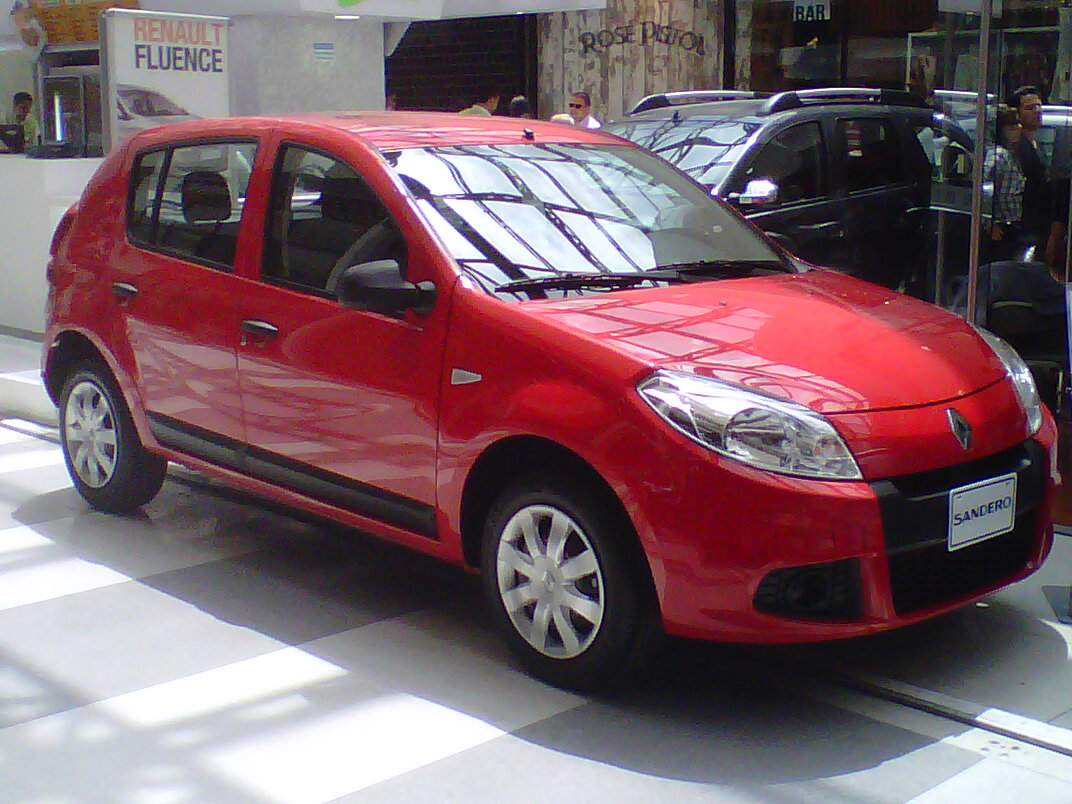
Renault Sandero (facelift, Colombia)

With a slightly shorter wheelbase than the Dacia Logan sedan from which it derives, the Sandero was developed at Renault's Technocentre near Paris, France, in conjunction with the regional engineering centres based in Brazil and Romania. It was revealed for the first time at the 2007 Frankfurt Motor Show, and made its formal market debut in Brazil, as a Renault model, in December 2007, being the first Renault model to debut outside Europe.

It was launched subsequently in Europe as a Dacia model at the Geneva Motor Show in March 2008. Renault began manufacturing the Sandero in South Africa in February 2009, and in December 2009, in Russia. A Renault version is also manufactured in Colombia for its home market and for export to countries including Chile.

=== Facelift ===
In May 2011, Renault launched in Brazil a facelifted version of Sandero, which enjoys a new face and a revised interior.

In Colombia, the facelifted versions of the Renault Sandero and the Renault Stepway were revealed at the beginning of 2012 with some differences from the other versions sold, such as the location of the doors locks and the passenger's airbag.

=== Safety ===
On the passive safety front, Sandero has been designed to meet the requirements of European regulations. Depending on equipment level, Dacia Sandero comes with up to four airbags. In terms of active safety Dacia Sandero features the latest generation Bosch 8.1 ABS which incorporates EBD and EBA (emergency brake assist).

==== Euro NCAP ====
Euro NCAP in 2008 rated the Dacia Sandero fitted with the basic level of safety equipment and also crash tested the car equipped with the 'safety pack', which is standard on some variants, and optional on others. The crash test for basic level Dacia Sandero equipped with front seat belt load limiters, driver frontal airbag and front passenger frontal airbag, scored 3 stars for adults, 4 stars for children occupants and 1 star for pedestrians.

- Adult Occupant:, score 25
- Child Occupant:, score 38
- Pedestrian:, score 6

The EuroNCAP 2008 test for the 'safety pack' model equipped with side body and head airbags and front seatbelt pretensioners, received a score of 31 for adults, 38 for children occupants and 6 for pedestrians, these results being rated as 4 from 5 stars for adults and children occupants.

- Adult Occupant:, score 31
- Child Occupant:, score 38
- Pedestrian:, score 6

==== Latin NCAP ====
The Sandero in its most basic Latin American market configuration with no airbags received 1 star for adult occupants and 2 stars for toddlers from Latin NCAP 1.0 in 2012.

Latin NCAP 1.0 test results Renault Sandero - NO Airbags (2012, based on Euro NCAP 1997)
Test	Points	Stars
Adult occupant:	4.61/17.0	1 /5 stars
Child occupant:	18.78/49.00	2 /5 stars

=== Engines ===
Name	Code	Capacity	Power	Acceleration 0–100 km/h (0-62 mph)	Top speed	Combined consumption
1.0 16v	D4D Hi-Flex	999 cc	77 hp (57 kW)	14.1 s	161 km/h (100 mph)	(gas/ethanol)
1.2 16v	D4F 732	1,149 cc	75 hp (55 kW)	13.6 s	161 km/h (100 mph)	5.9 L/100 km (48 mpg_{‑imp}; 40 mpg_{‑US})
1.4 8v	K7J 710	1,390 cc	75 hp (55 kW)	13.0 s	161 km/h (100 mph)	6.9 L/100 km (41 mpg_{‑imp}; 34 mpg_{‑US})
1.4 8v	K7J LPG	1,390 cc	72 hp (53 kW)	13.0 s	161 km/h (100 mph)	9.2 L/100 km (31 mpg_{‑imp}; 26 mpg_{‑US}) (LPG)
1.6 8v	K7M 800	1,598 cc	85 hp (63 kW)	12.9 s	169 km/h (105 mph)	6.7 L/100 km (42 mpg_{‑imp}; 35 mpg_{‑US})
1.6 8v	K7M Hi-Torque	1,598 cc	95 hp (70 kW)	11.7 s	174 km/h (108 mph)	(gas/ethanol)
1.6 16v	K4M 696	1,598 cc	105 hp (77 kW)	11.3 s	181 km/h (112 mph)	6.8 L/100 km (42 mpg_{‑imp}; 35 mpg_{‑US})
1.6 16v	K4M Hi-Flex	1,598 cc	112 hp (82 kW)	10.8 s	195 km/h (121 mph)	9.3 L/100 km (30 mpg_{‑imp}; 25 mpg_{‑US}) (ethanol)
1.5 dCi	K9K 892	1,461 cc	75 hp (55 kW)	15.0 s	157 km/h (98 mph)	4.5 L/100 km (63 mpg_{‑imp}; 52 mpg_{‑US})
1.5 dCi	K9K 892	1,461 cc	90 hp (66 kW)	13.0 s	167 km/h (104 mph)	4.6 L/100 km (61 mpg_{‑imp}; 51 mpg_{‑US})

=== Sandero Stepway ===
Renault do Brasil, which is the Brazilian subsidiary of French car manufacturer Renault, released in October 2008 the Sandero-based crossover Stepway, ten months after launching the Sandero brand there. The Brazilian Stepway has a 1.6 litre 112 hp (82 kW) 16 valve engine, the Hi-Flex one with bio-ethanol abilities, and it is marketed in Brazil, Colombia, Argentina and Mexico.

The European version, unveiled on May 7, 2009, at the Barcelona International Motor Show under the Dacia brand, is available in most of the European markets as of September 2009. Dacia Sandero Stepway comes with a 1.6 litre and 90 hp (66 kW) petrol engine or 1.5 dCi 70 hp (51 kW) diesel engine.

Although it was exclusively available with front-wheel drive, a 4WD prototype was created in 2010 by the University of Pitesti.

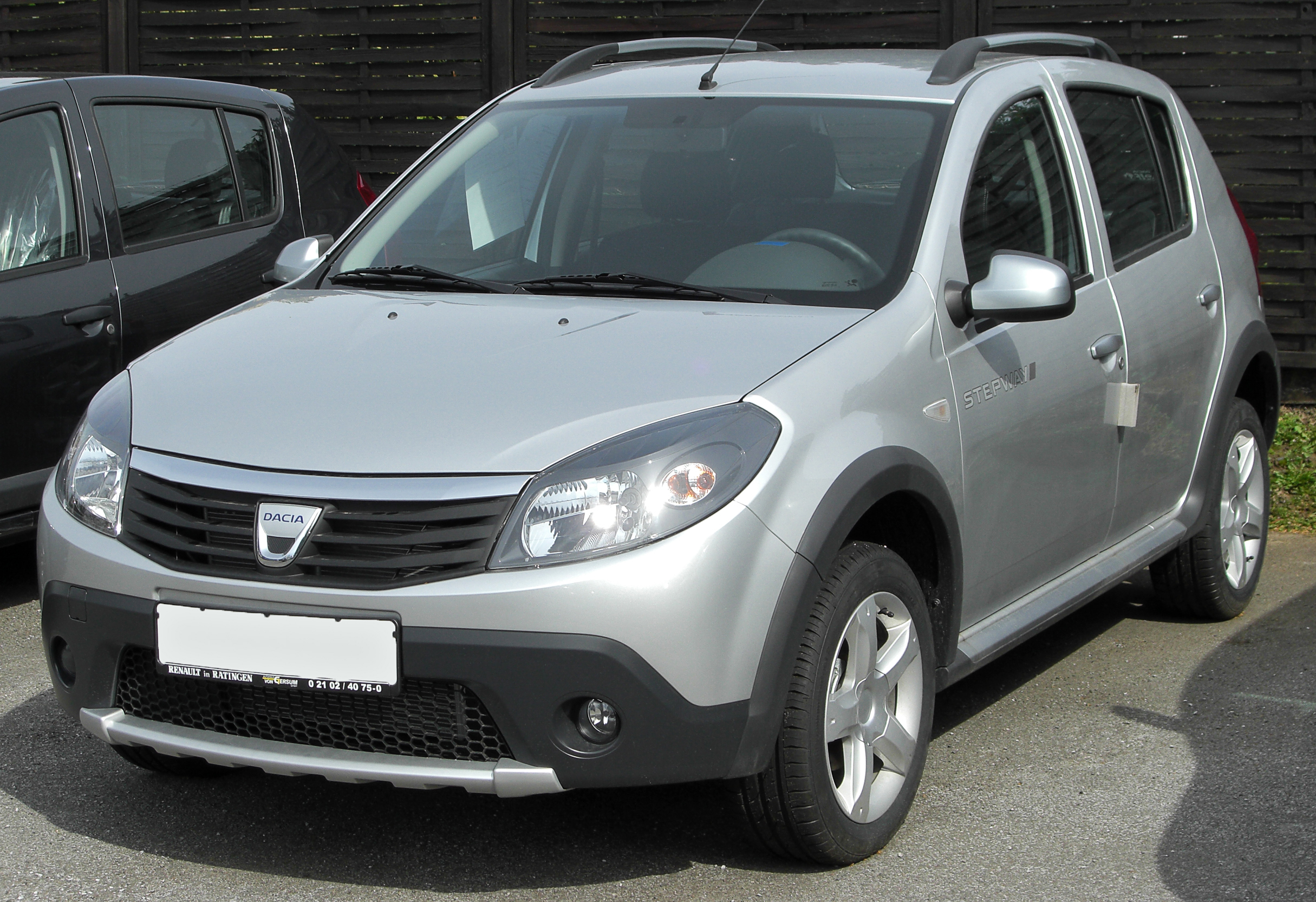
Dacia Sandero Stepway

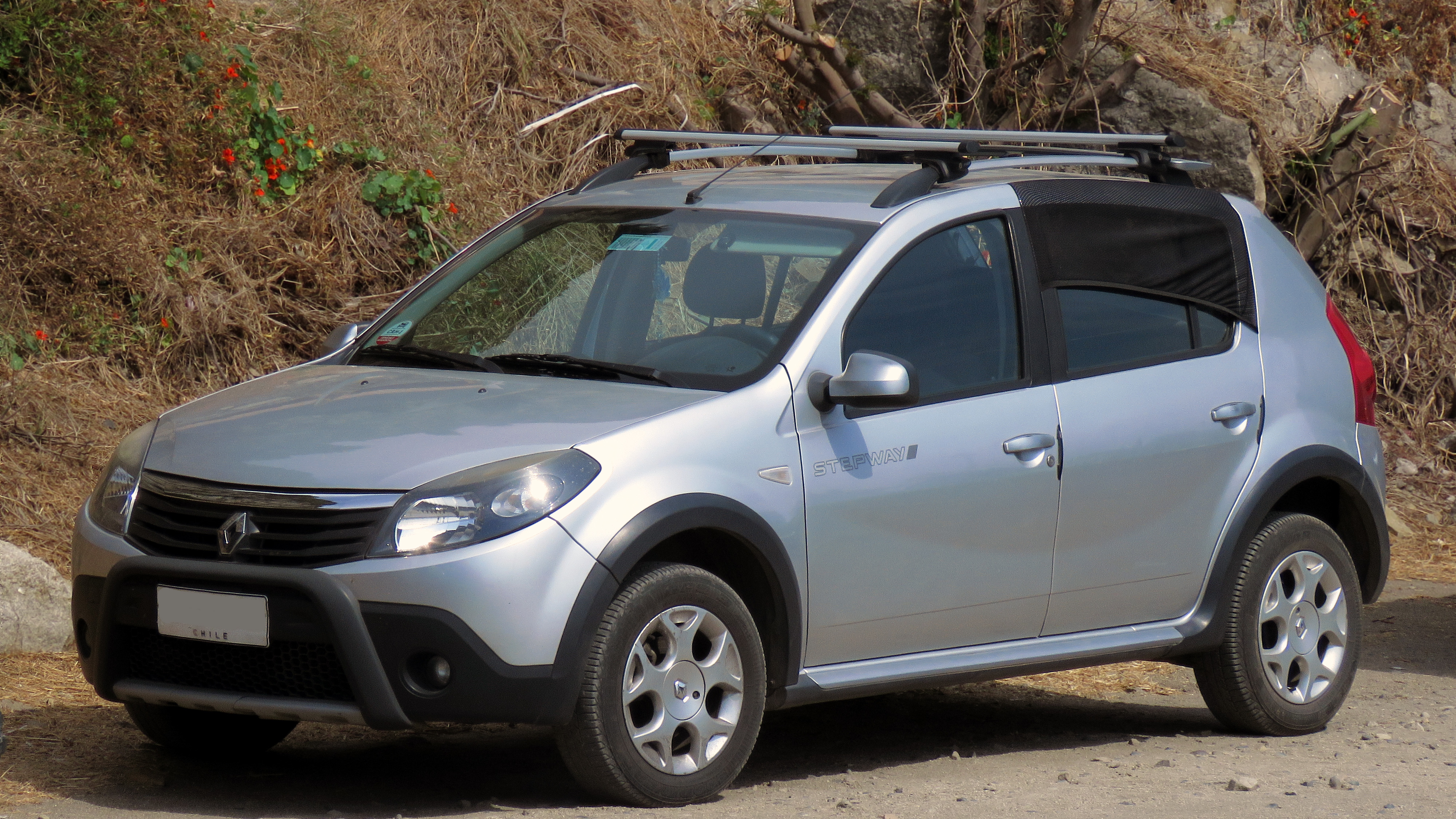
Renault Sandero Stepway

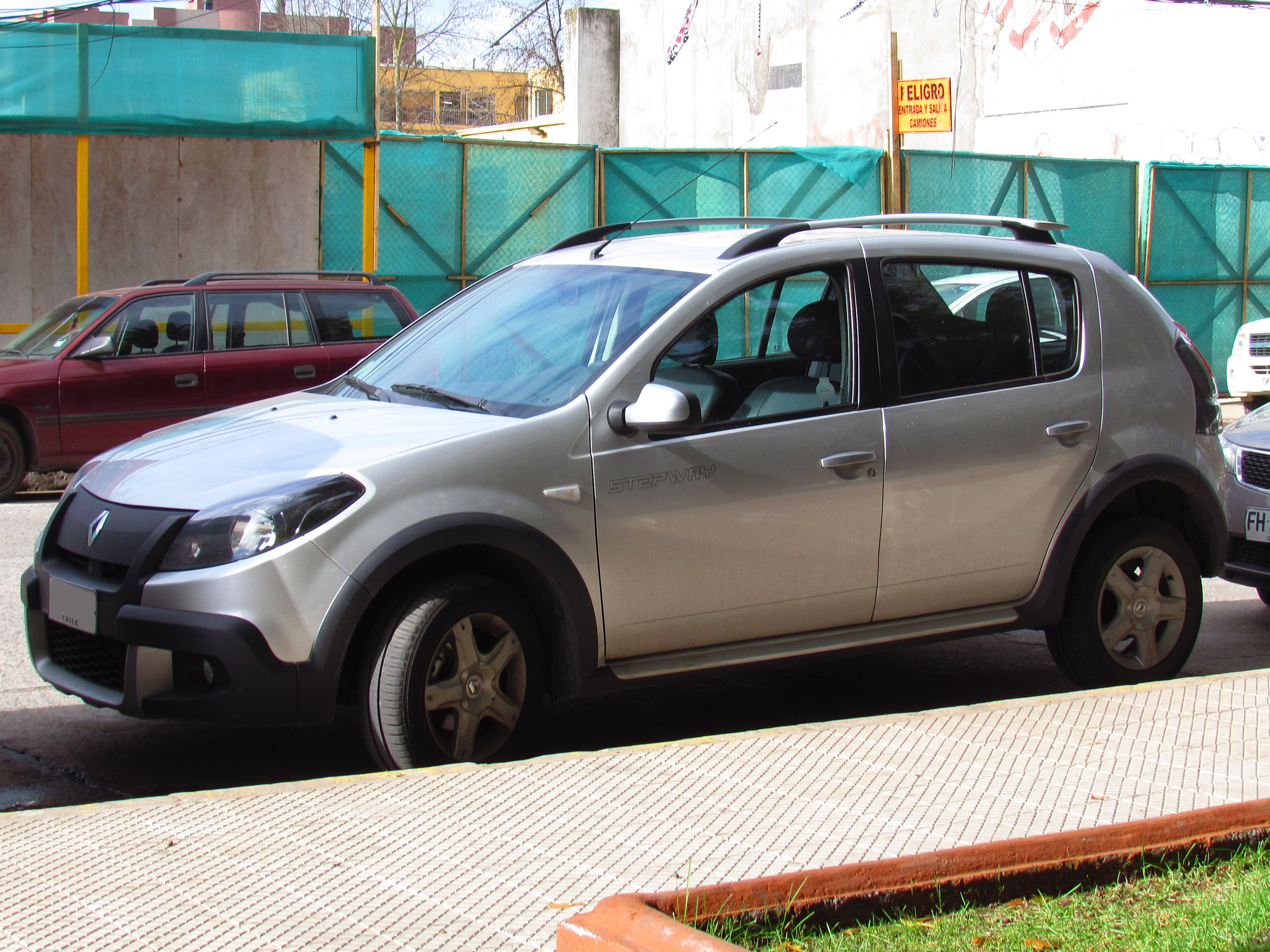
Renault Sandero Stepway (facelift)

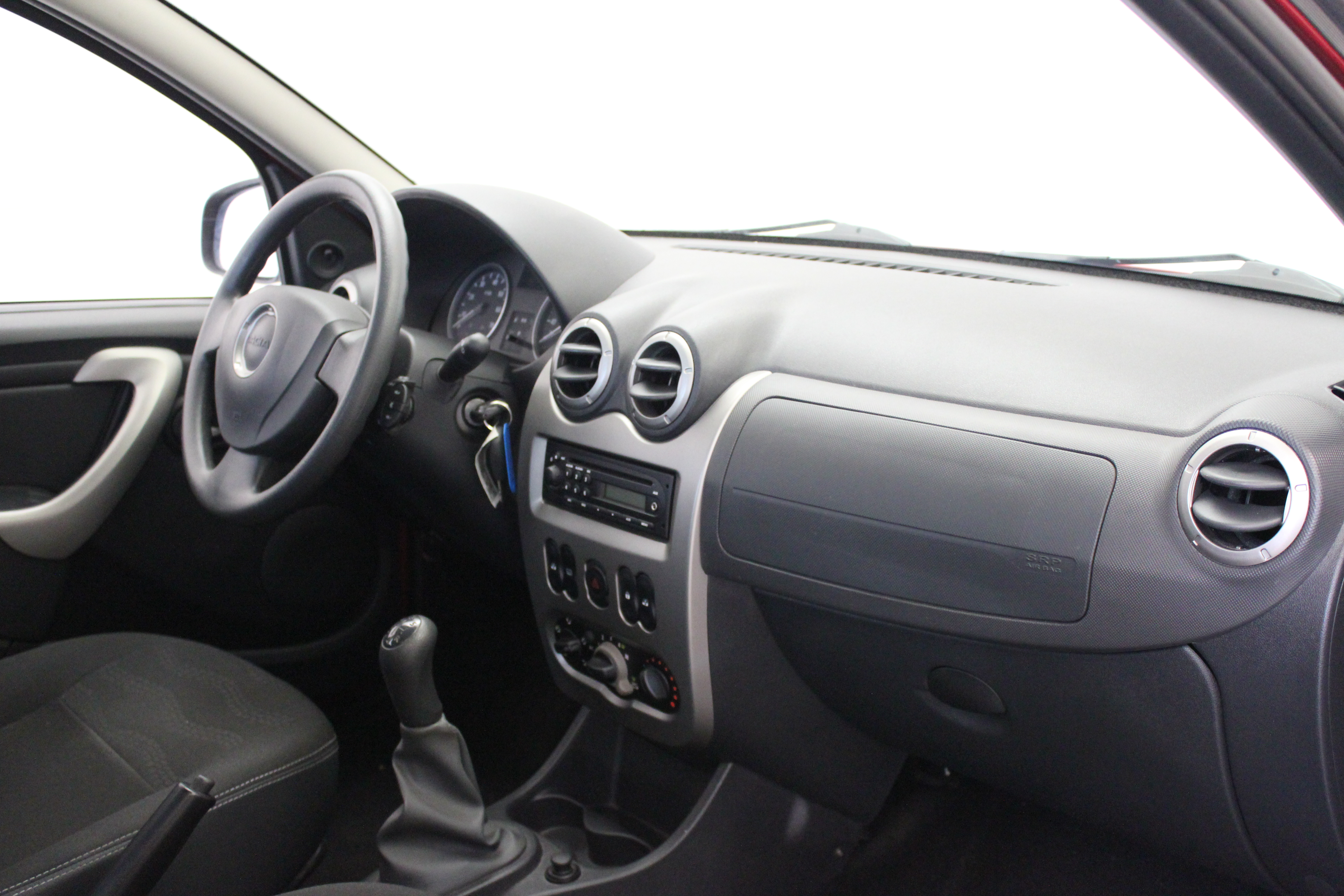
Interior of the first generation Sandero Stepway

== Second generation (B52; 2012) ==
Sandero II
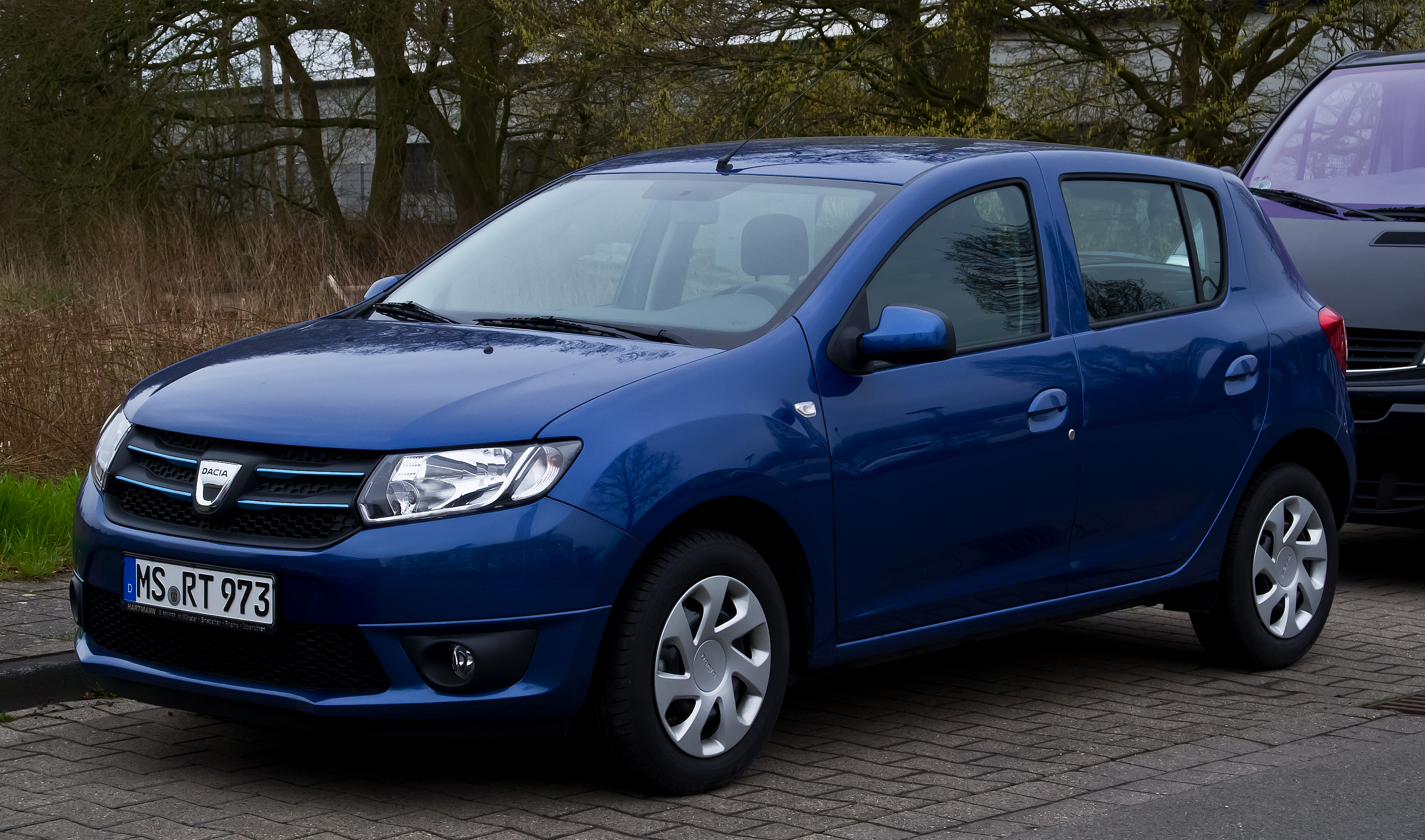

Overview
- Also called: Renault Sandero; Renault Sandero Stepway; Renault Stepway (crossover)
- Production: 2012–2020 (Romania); 2014–2024 (Brazil); 2014–2022 (Russia); 2016–2021 (Algeria); 2016–2025 (Argentina); 2015-2026 (Colombia)
- Assembly: Romania: Mioveni; Morocco: Casablanca (Somaca); Tangier; Brazil: São José dos Pinhais (Renault Brazil); Argentina: Santa Isabel, Córdoba (Renault Argentina); Colombia: Envigado (Sofasa); Algeria: Oran (Renault Algeria); Russia: Togliatti (AvtoVAZ)
- Designer: Renault Design Central Europe

Body and chassis
- Platform: Dacia M0 platform
- Related: Dacia Logan II

Powertrain
- Engine: Petrol: 0.9 L H4Bt 12V turbo I3; 1.0 L B4D 12V I3; 1.2 L D4F 16V I4; 1.6 L K4M 16V I4; 1.6 L K7M 8V I4; Petrol flex-fuel: 1.0 L B4D 12V I3; 1.0 L D4D 16V I4; 1.6 L K4M 16V I4; 1.6 L H4M 16V I4; 2.0 L F4R 16V I4 (R.S.); Petrol LPG: 1.2 L D4F 16V I4; Diesel: 1.5 L K9K dCi I4
- Transmission: 5-speed manual 6-speed manual (R.S.); 4-speed automatic 5-speed automated manual (Easy-R); CVT

Dimensions
- Wheelbase: 2,589 mm (101.9 in)
- Length: 4,069–4,089 mm (160.2–161.0 in)
- Width: 1,733–1,761 mm (68.2–69.3 in)
- Height: 1,519–1,630 mm (59.8–64.2 in)
- Curb weight: 969–1,237 kg (2,136–2,727 lb)

Chronology
- Successor: Renault Kardian (Latin America, Mexico; Stepway); Renault Kwid (Mexico)

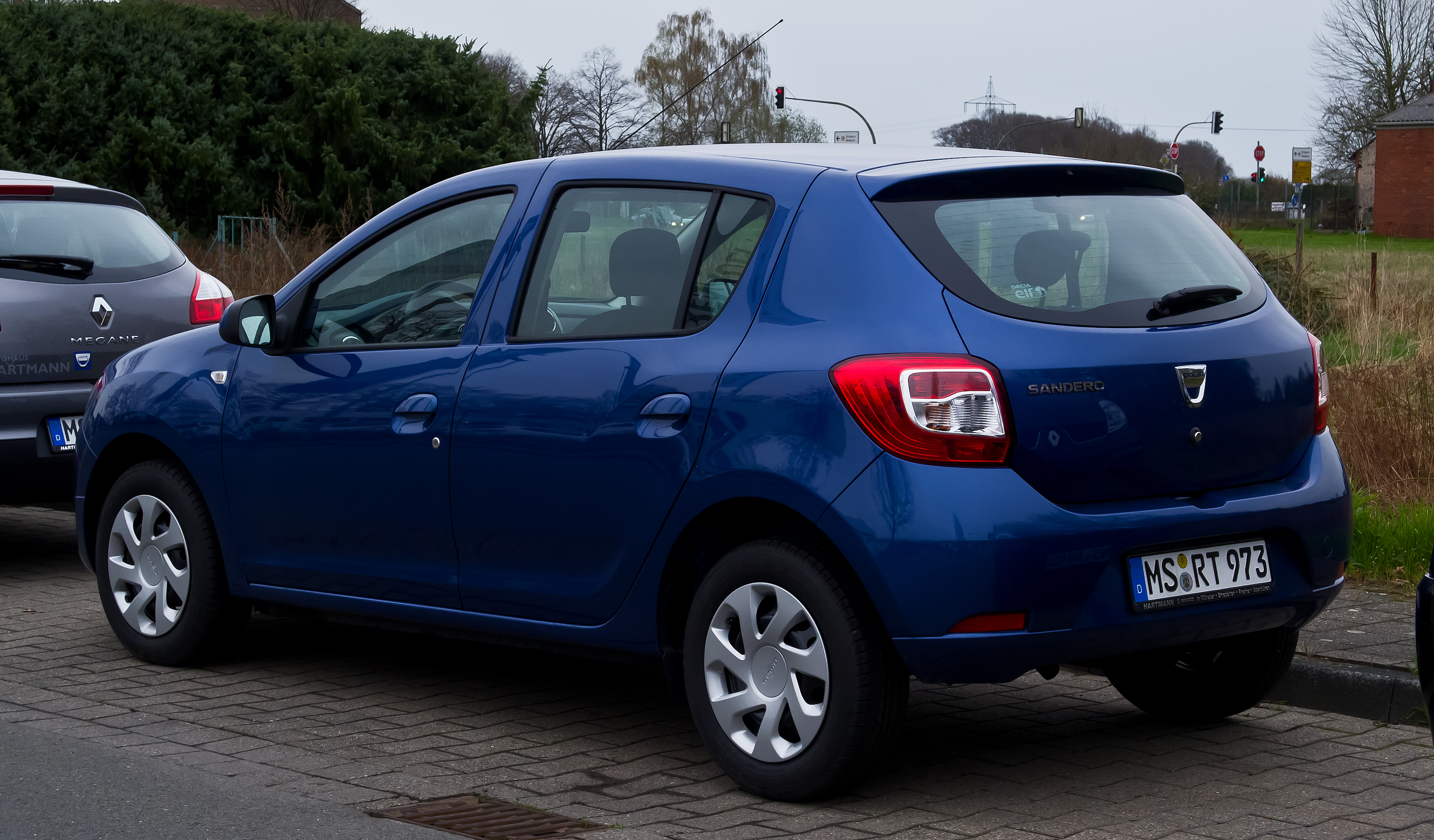
Rear view

The second generation Sandero was revealed by Dacia at the 2012 Paris Motor Show. The new Stepway variant was also presented. The hatchback model and the mini crossover version were spotted covered in camouflage during 2012, in the months of June, July, and September, and CGI impressions of the new model were released by car magazines Auto Bild and Za Rulem.

Official photos with the new Sandero were released by Dacia on 17 September 2012, showing an exterior design theme similar to the new Logan and a dashboard inspired from Lodgy.

=== Marketing and production ===
In Romania, the new Sandero and Sandero Stepway could be ordered from 1 October 2012. It also became available in the United Kingdom, where it joined the Duster in dealerships from 2013, being the most affordable car on the market.

In June 2014, it was launched as the new Renault Sandero in Brazil, where it is also manufactured for South American and Mexican markets. Sales in Russia began in September 2014, the Sandero being locally assembled at the AvtoVAZ plant.

The current Sandero model (produced from 2012) is produced in Mioveni, Romania (near Pitești) for RHD markets such as the United Kingdom, Ireland, Cyprus, and South Africa (as Renault Sandero), it is also produced in Algeria by Renault Algeria since beginning of 2016 for the local market (only the Stepway version).

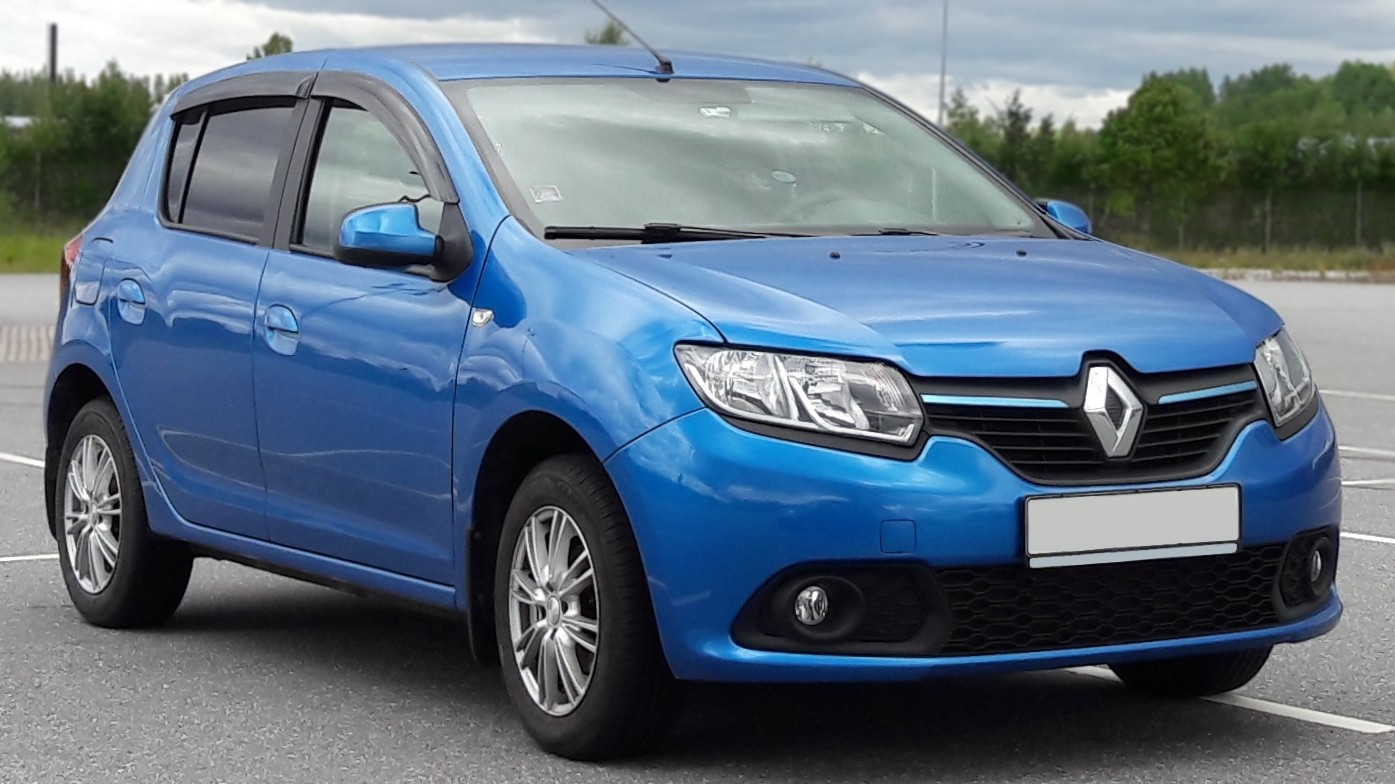
Renault Sandero (Russian model, pre-facelift)

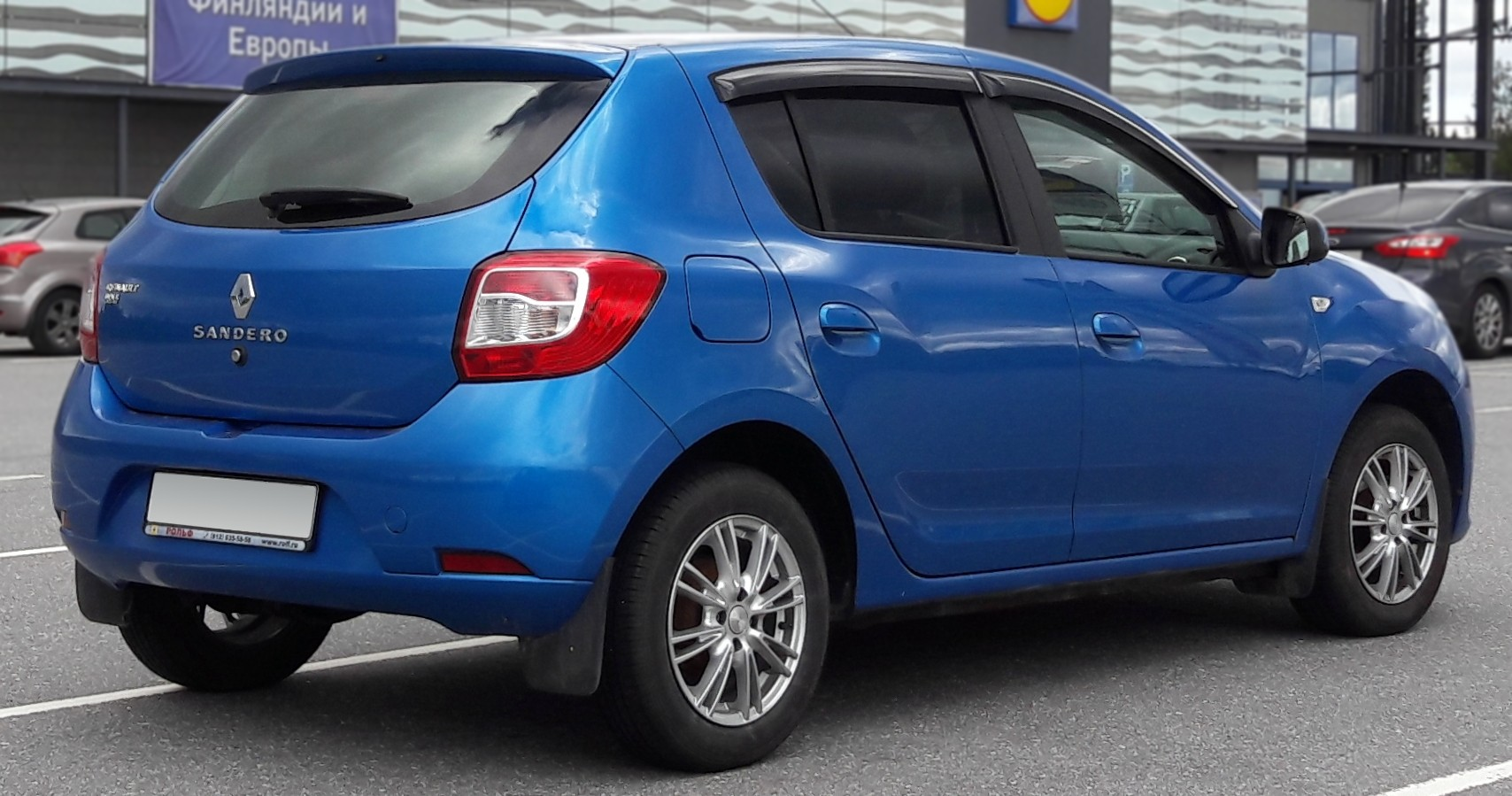
Renault Sandero (Russian model, pre-facelift)

=== Safety ===
The Renault Sandero has optional rear disc brakes.

==== Euro NCAP ====
In May 2013, the second generation Dacia Sandero achieved a four star Euro NCAP overall rating for basic level, improving on the previous basic model's three star score.

The car received a score of 29 points (80%) for adults, 39 points (79%) for children occupants, 21 points (57%) for pedestrians and 5 points (55%) for safety assist, these results being rated as 5/5 stars for adult and child occupant protections, and 4/5 stars for pedestrian protection and safety assist.

- Adult Occupant:
- Child Occupant:
- Pedestrian:
- Safety Assist:

==== Latin NCAP ====
The Sandero in its most basic Latin American market configuration with 2 airbags and no ESC received 1 star for adult occupants and 3 stars for toddlers from Latin NCAP 2.0 in 2018.

Latin NCAP 2.0 test results Renault Sandero / Logan + 2 Airbags (2018, based on Euro NCAP 2008)
Test	Points	Stars
Adult occupant:	18.01/34.0	1 /5 stars
Child occupant:	28.97/49.00	3 /5 stars

The Sandero in its most basic Latin American market configuration with 4 airbags and no ESC received 1 star for adult occupants and 4 stars for toddlers from Latin NCAP 2.0 in 2019.

Latin NCAP 2.0 test results Renault Sandero / Logan / Stepway + 4 Airbags * (2019, based on Euro NCAP 2008)
Test	Points	Stars
Adult occupant:	23.28/34.0	1 /5 stars
Child occupant:	38.52/49.00	4 /5 stars

The updated Sandero in its most basic Latin American market configuration received 3 stars for adult occupants and 4 stars for toddlers from Latin NCAP 2.0 in 2019.

Latin NCAP 2.0 test results Renault Sandero / Logan / Stepway + 4 Airbags ** (2019, based on Euro NCAP 2008)
Test	Points	Stars
Adult occupant:	23.40/34.0	3 /5 stars
Child occupant:	38.52/49.00	4 /5 stars

The updated Sandero in its most basic Latin American market configuration received 0 stars from Latin NCAP 3.0 in 2024 (similar to Euro NCAP 2014).

Latin NCAP 3.5 test results Renault Sandero / Logan / Stepway + 4 Airbags (2024, similar to Euro NCAP 2017)
Test	Points	%
Overall:	0 /5 stars	
Adult occupant:	13.13	33%
Child occupant:	30.00	61%
Pedestrian:	22.22	46%
Safety assist:	0.00	0%

==== Global NCAP ====
The Sandero for Africa received 3 stars for adult occupants and 4 stars for toddlers from Global NCAP 1.0 in 2017 (based on Latin NCAP 2013).

Global NCAP 1.0 test results (South Africa) Renault Sandero – 2 Airbags (2017, similar to Latin NCAP 2013)
Test	Score	Stars
Adult occupant protection	10.52/17.00	3 /5 stars
Child occupant protection	38.75/49.00	4 /5 stars

=== Engines ===
Engine	Code	Displ.	Power	Torque	Top speed	0–100 km/h (0-62 mph)	Combined consumption	CO_{2} emissions
Petrol engines
0.9 12v TCe	H4Bt 400	898 cc	90 PS (66 kW) at 5000 rpm	140 N⋅m (103 lb⋅ft) at 2250 rpm	173 km/h (107 mph)	11.8 s	4.9 L/100 km (58 mpg_{‑imp})	90 g/km
1.0 12v SCe	B4D	999 cc	73 PS (54 kW) at 6300 rpm	97 N⋅m (72 lb⋅ft) at 3500 rpm	158 km/h (98 mph)	14.2 s	5.2 L/100 km (54 mpg_{‑imp})	117 g/km
1.2 16v	D4F 732	1,149 cc	75 PS (55 kW) at 5500 rpm	107 N⋅m (79 lb⋅ft) at 4250 rpm	162 km/h (101 mph)	14.5 s	5.9 L/100 km (48 mpg_{‑imp})	137 g/km
1.2 16v LPG	D4F Bi-Fuel 732	1,149 cc	72 PS (53 kW) at 5500 rpm	105 N⋅m (77 lb⋅ft) at 4250 rpm	154 km/h (96 mph)	15.1 s	7.6 L/100 km (37 mpg_{‑imp})	120 g/km
Diesel engines
1.5 dCi 75	K9K 612	1,461 cc	75 PS (55 kW) at 4000 rpm	200 N⋅m (148 lb⋅ft) at 1750 rpm	159 km/h (99 mph)	14.6 s	3.9 L/100 km (72 mpg_{‑imp})	103 g/km
1.5 dCi 90	K9K 612	1,461 cc	90 PS (66 kW) at 3750 rpm	220 N⋅m (162 lb⋅ft) at 1750 rpm	167 km/h (104 mph)	12.1 s	3.9 L/100 km (72 mpg_{‑imp})	103 g/km

=== Stepway ===
A crossover-look version of the Sandero dubbed the Sandero Stepway continued for the second generation. It features raised ride height, grey plastic side skirts, overfenders, and a crossover-look bumpers. It is available both under the Dacia brand and Renault brand for Latin American markets. Starting from 2020, the Stepway is marketed as a separate model from the Sandero in Latin America.

==== Dacia ====
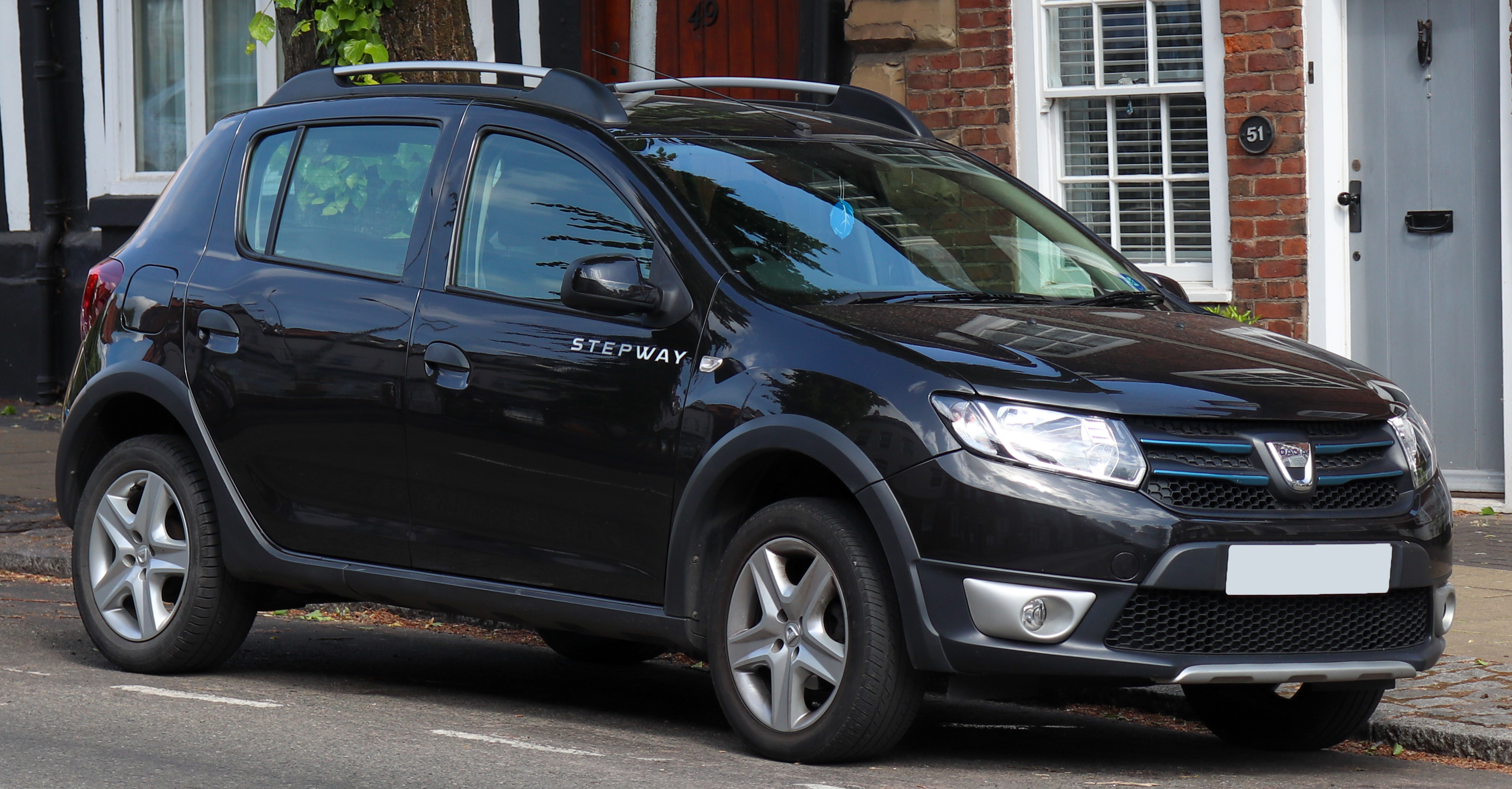
Dacia Sandero Stepway (pre-facelift)

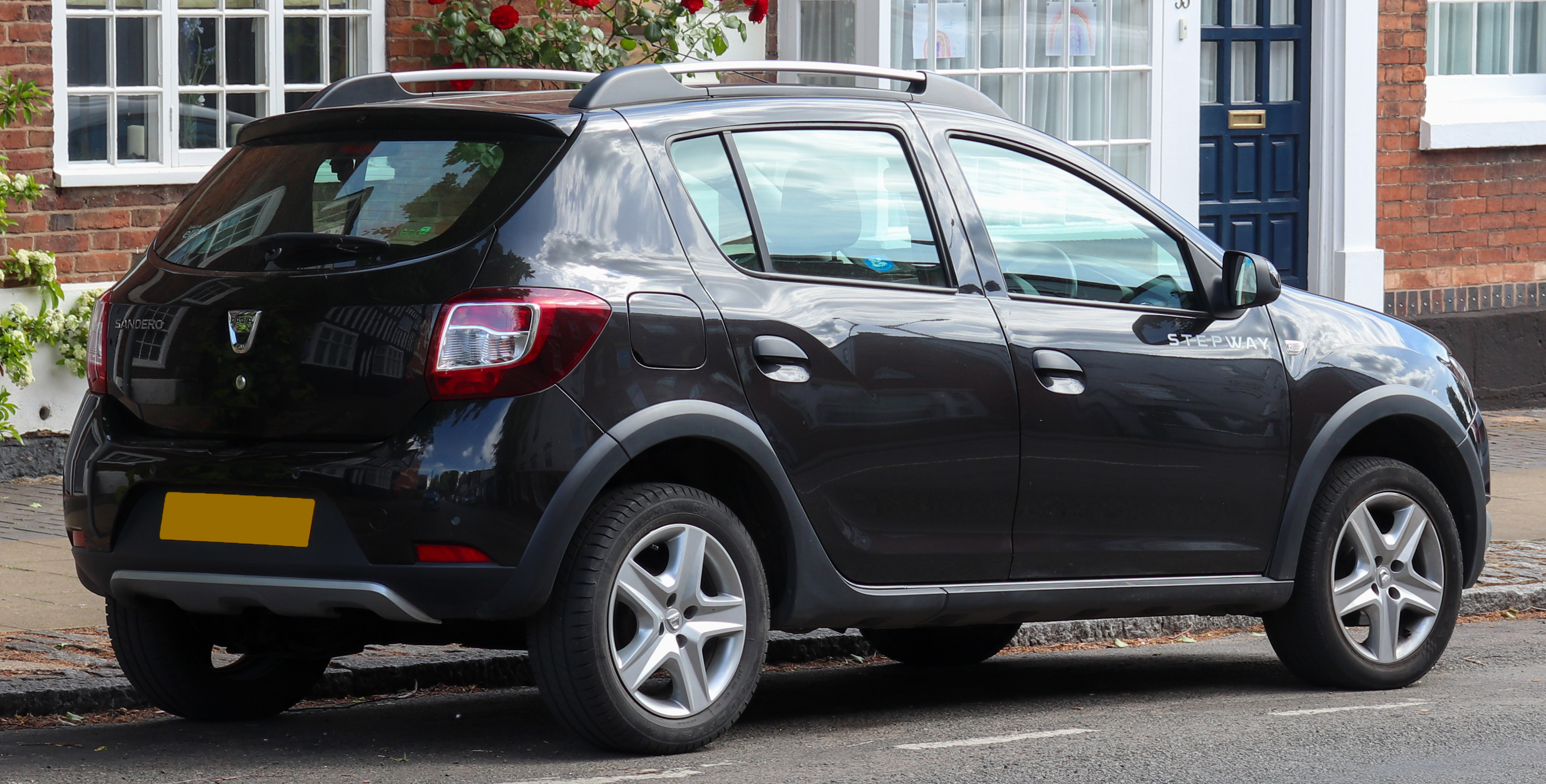
Dacia Sandero Stepway (pre-facelift)

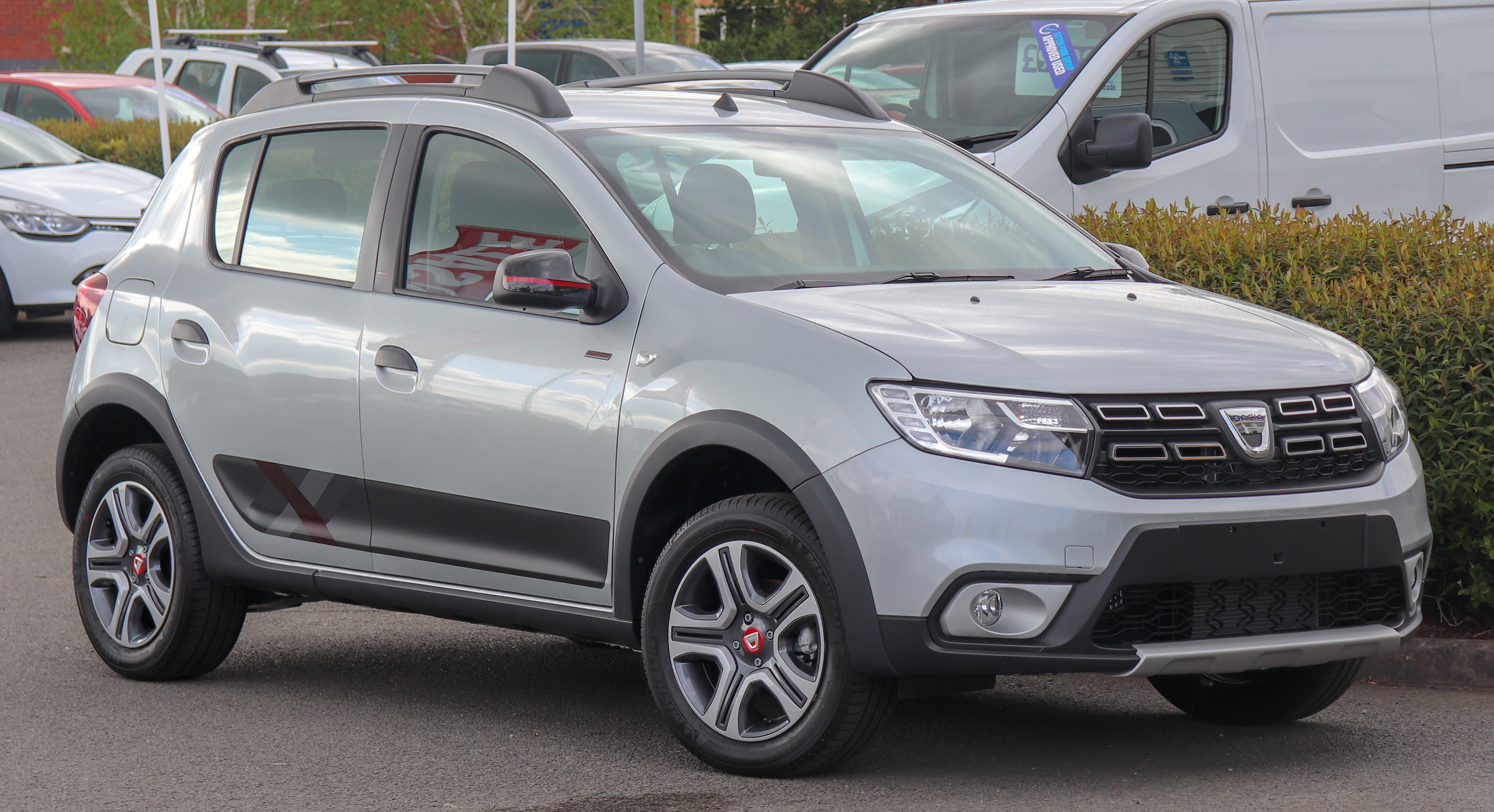
Dacia Sandero Stepway (2017 facelift)

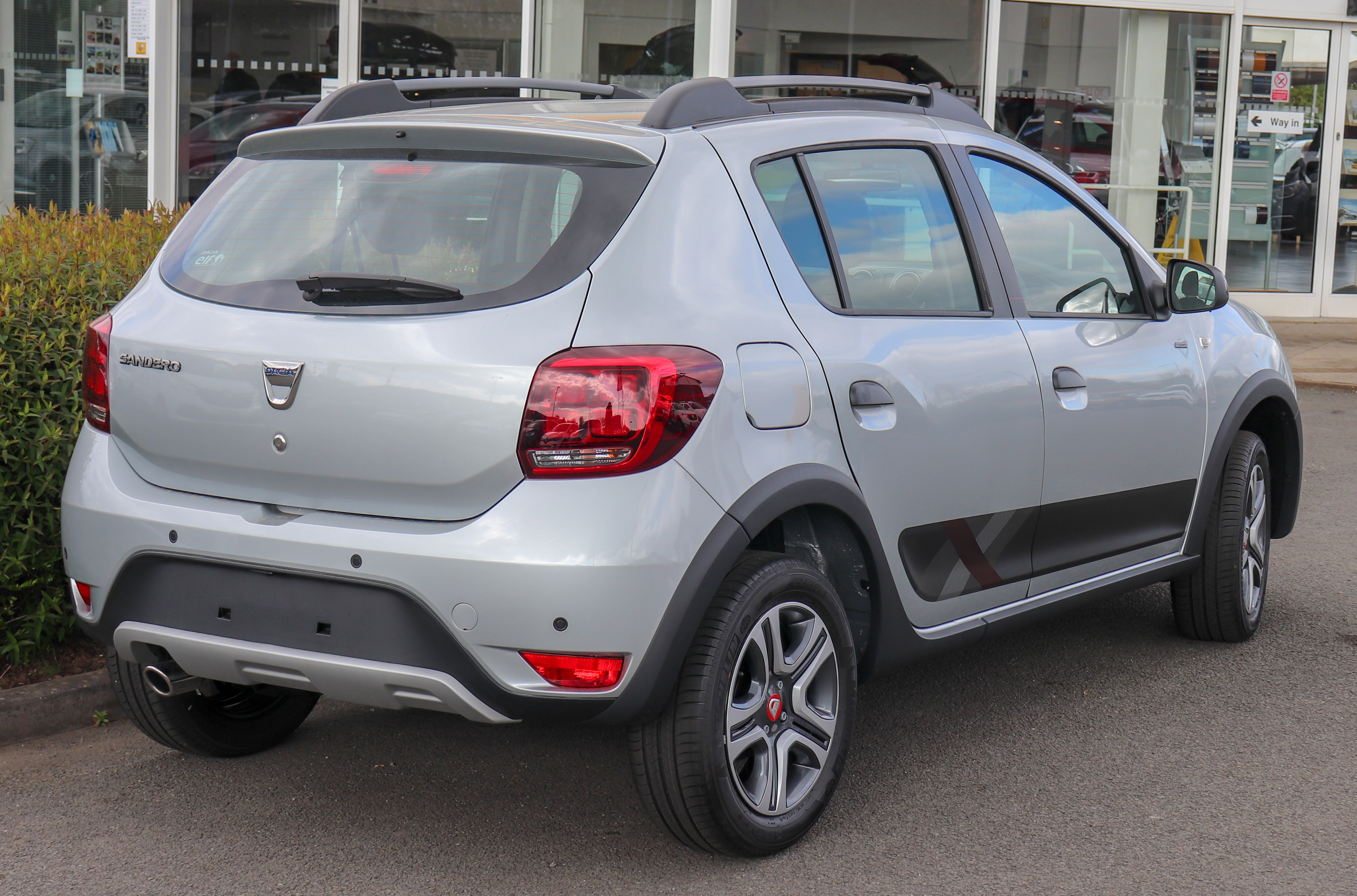
Dacia Sandero Stepway (2017 facelift)

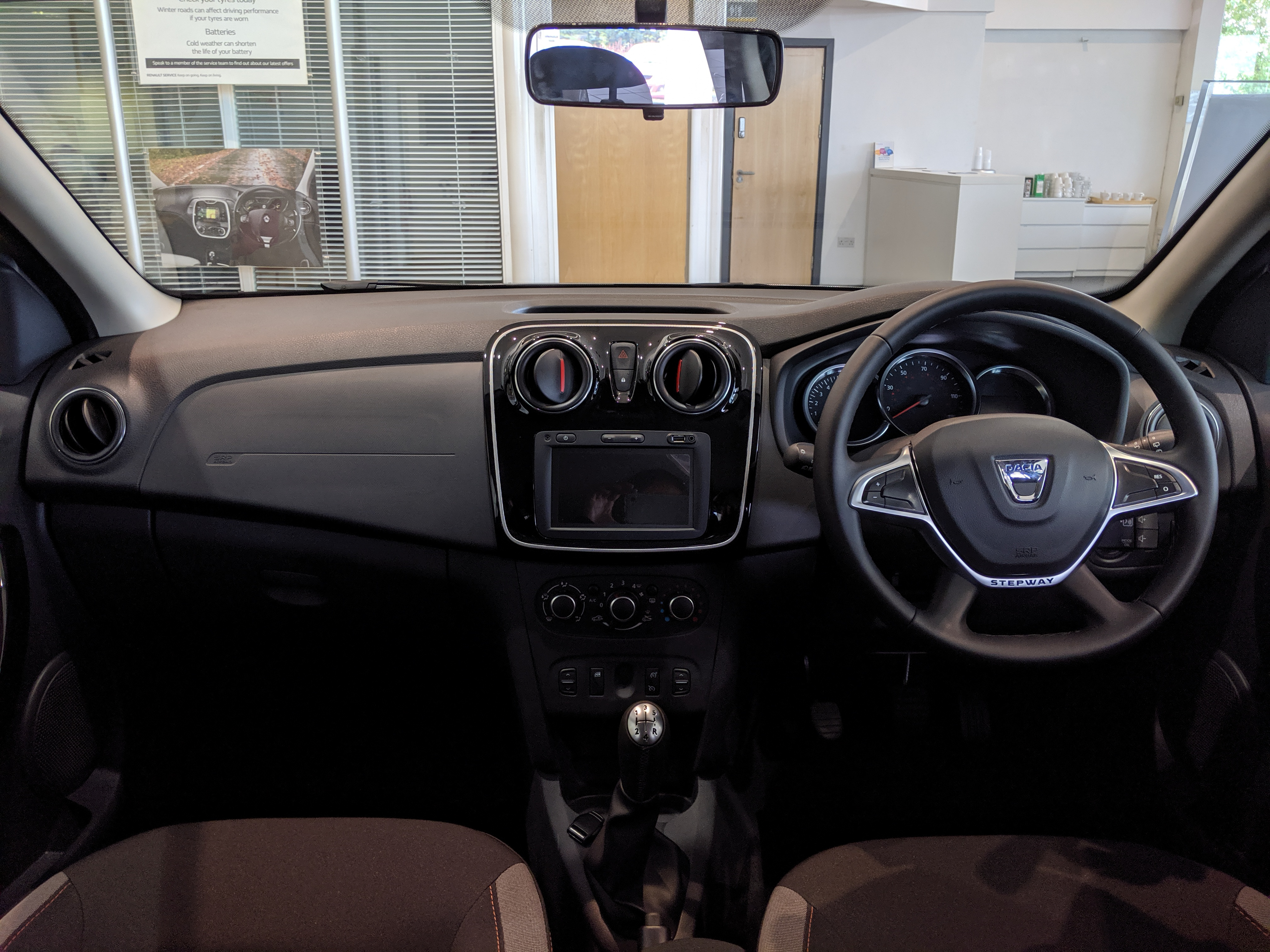
Interior (facelift)

==== Renault ====
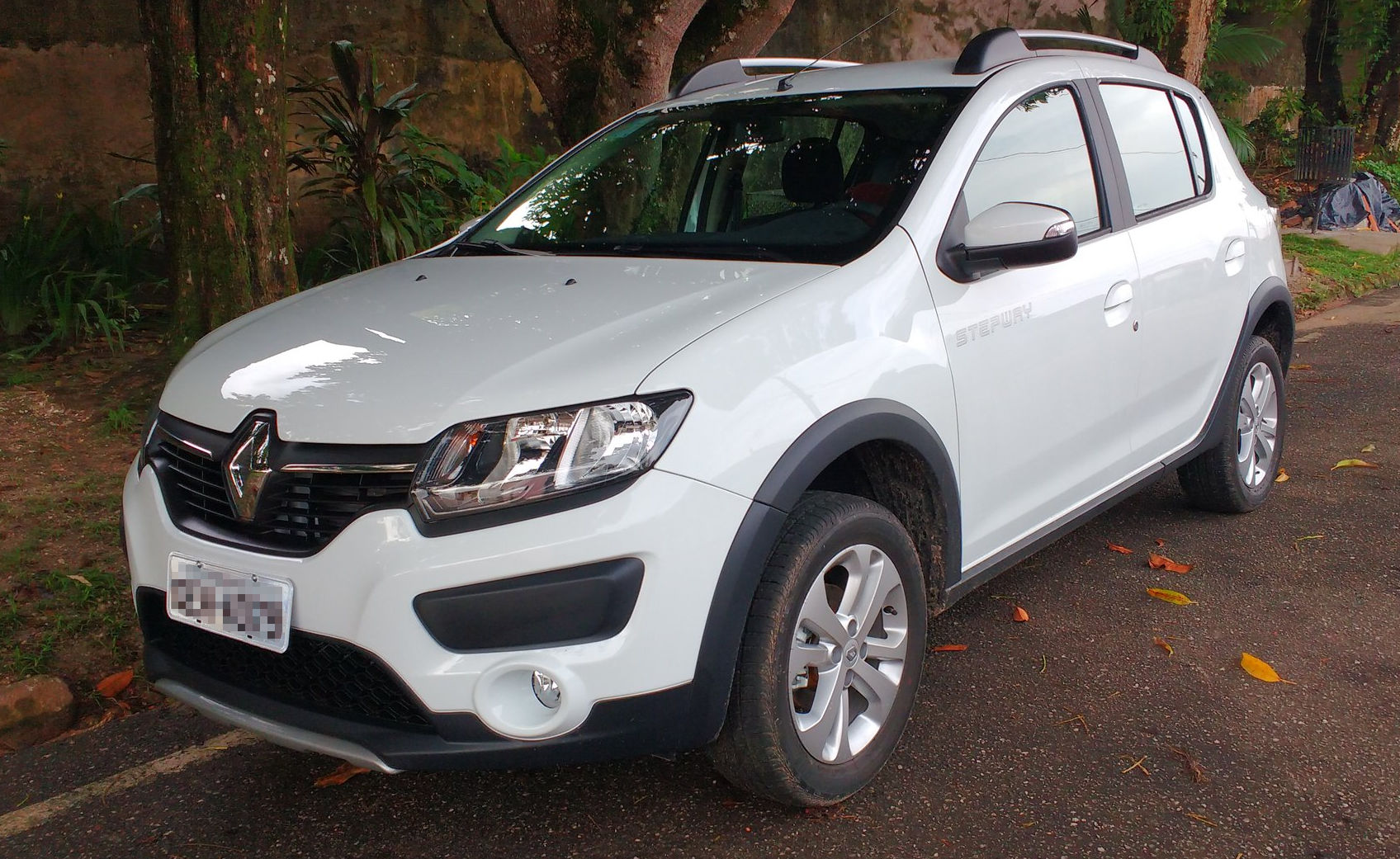
Renault Sandero Stepway (Brazilian version, pre-facelift)

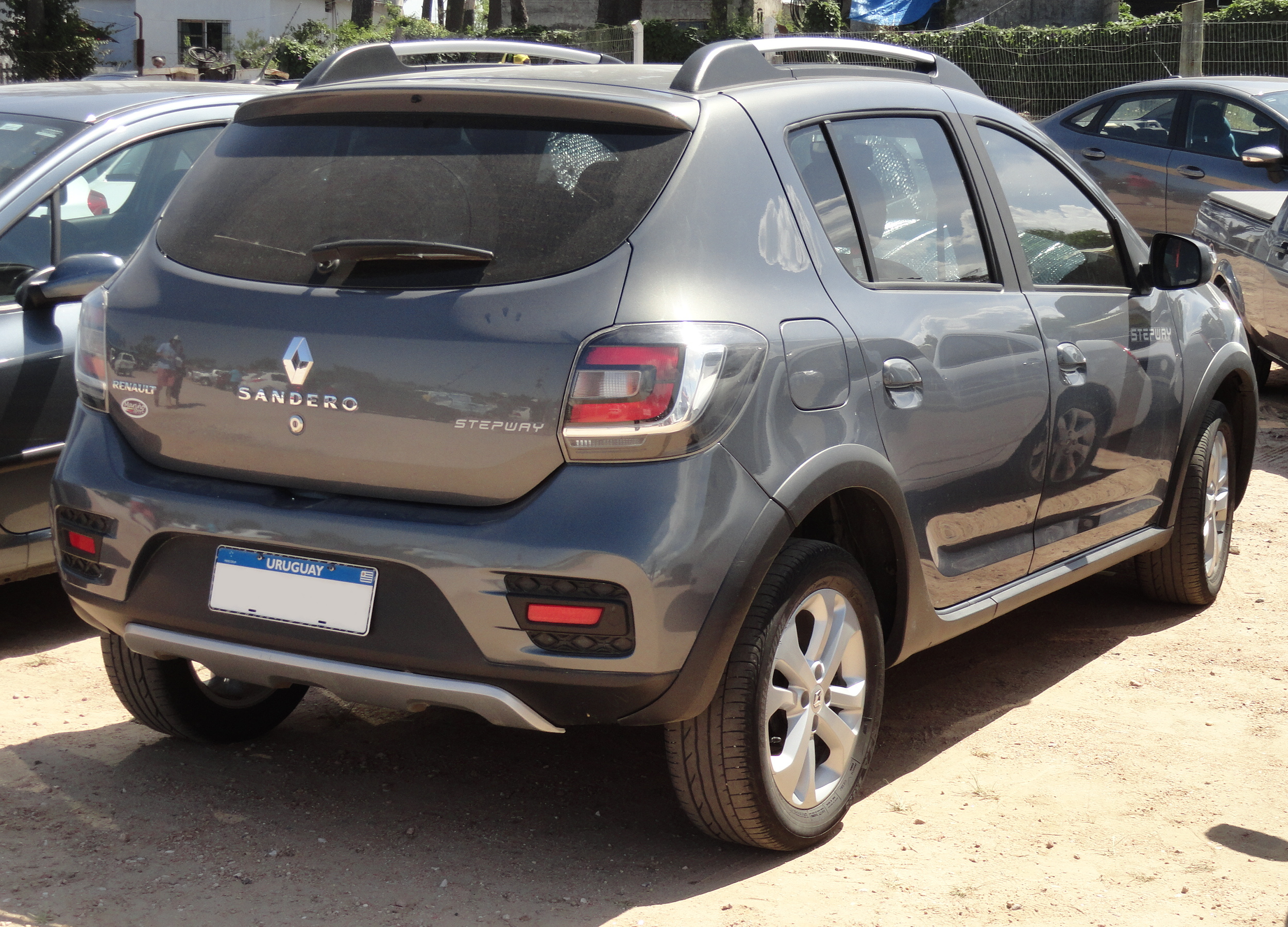
Renault Sandero Stepway (Brazilian version, pre-facelift)

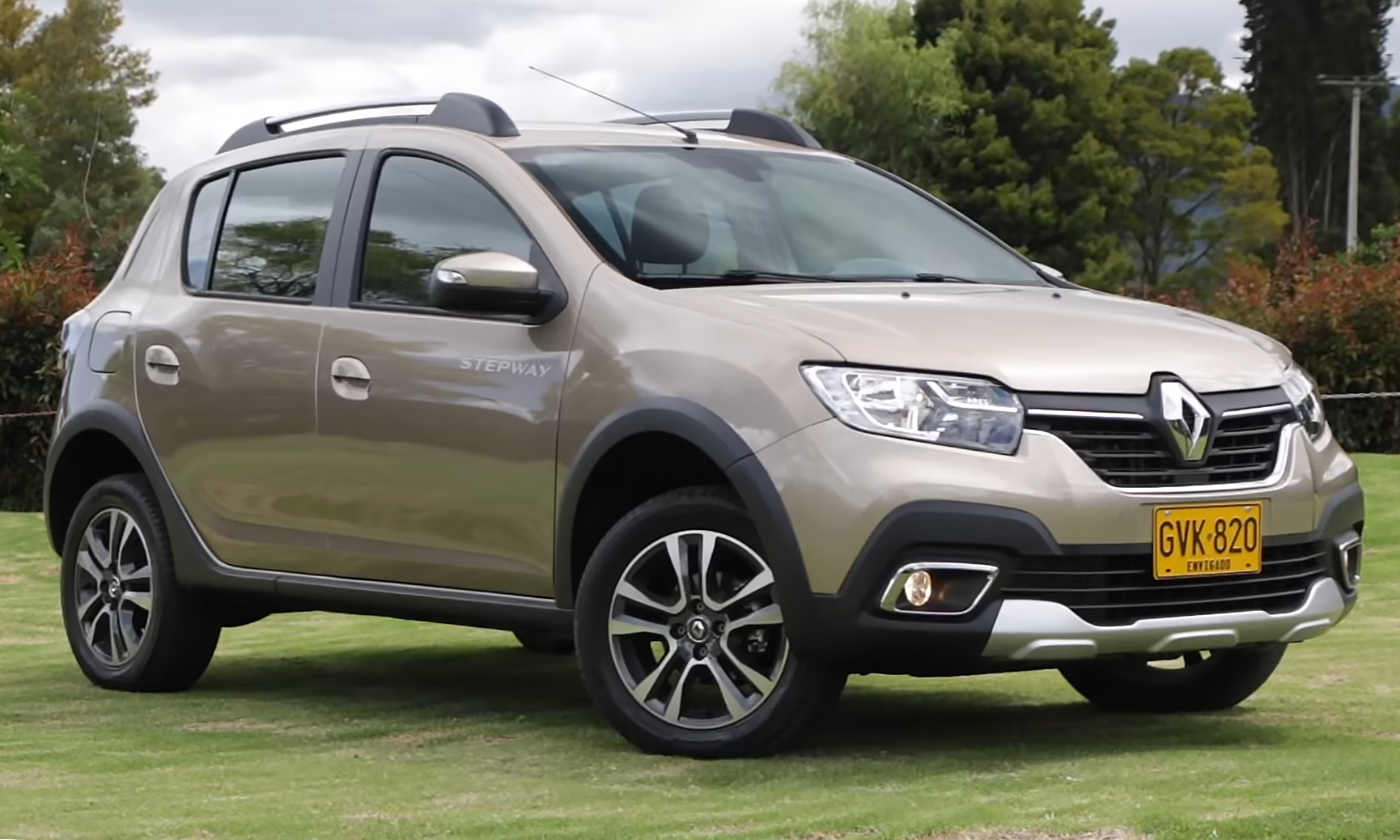
Renault Sandero Stepway (Latin American version, 2019 facelift)

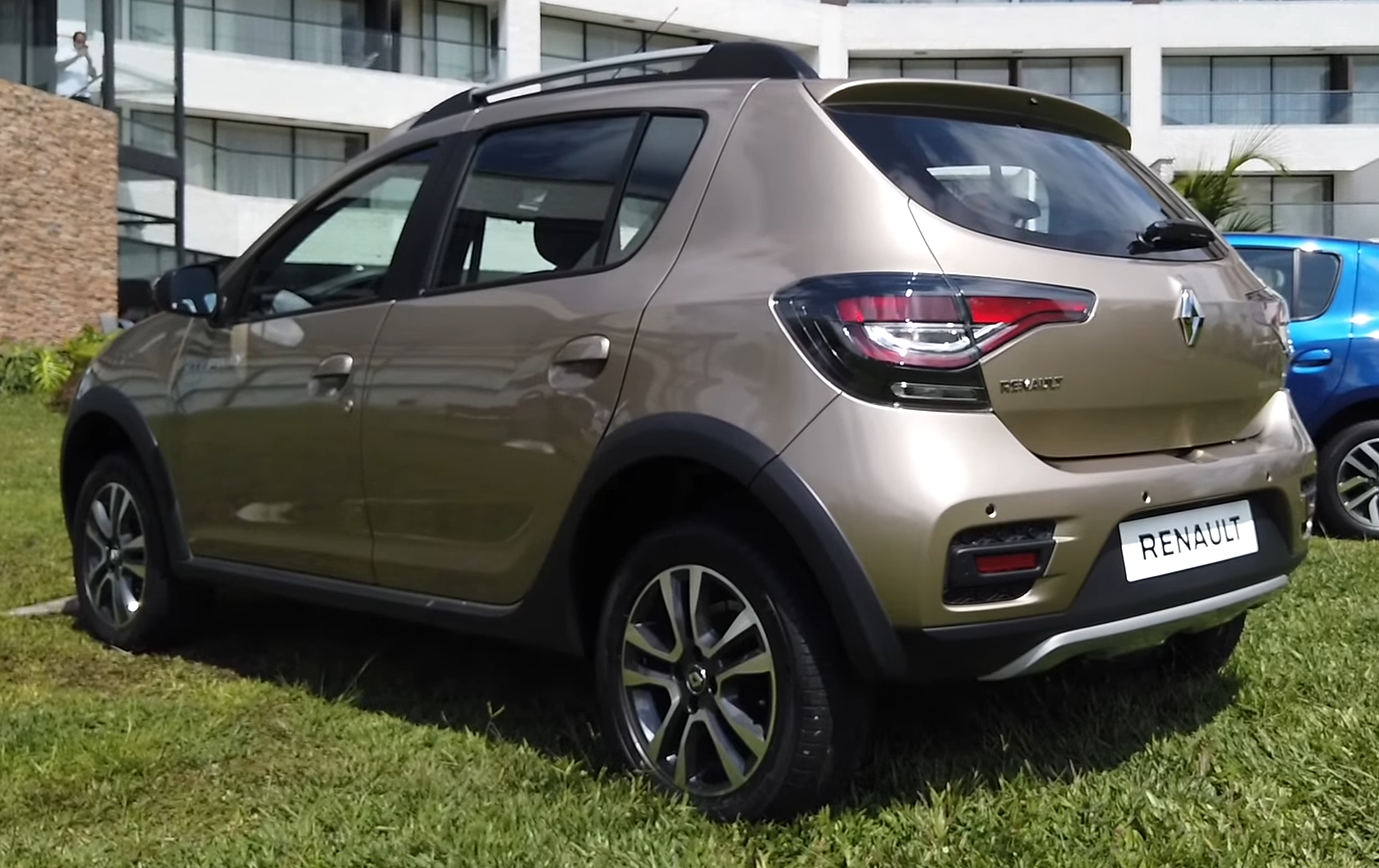
Renault Sandero Stepway (Latin American version, 2019 facelift)

=== Sandero R.S. 2.0 ===
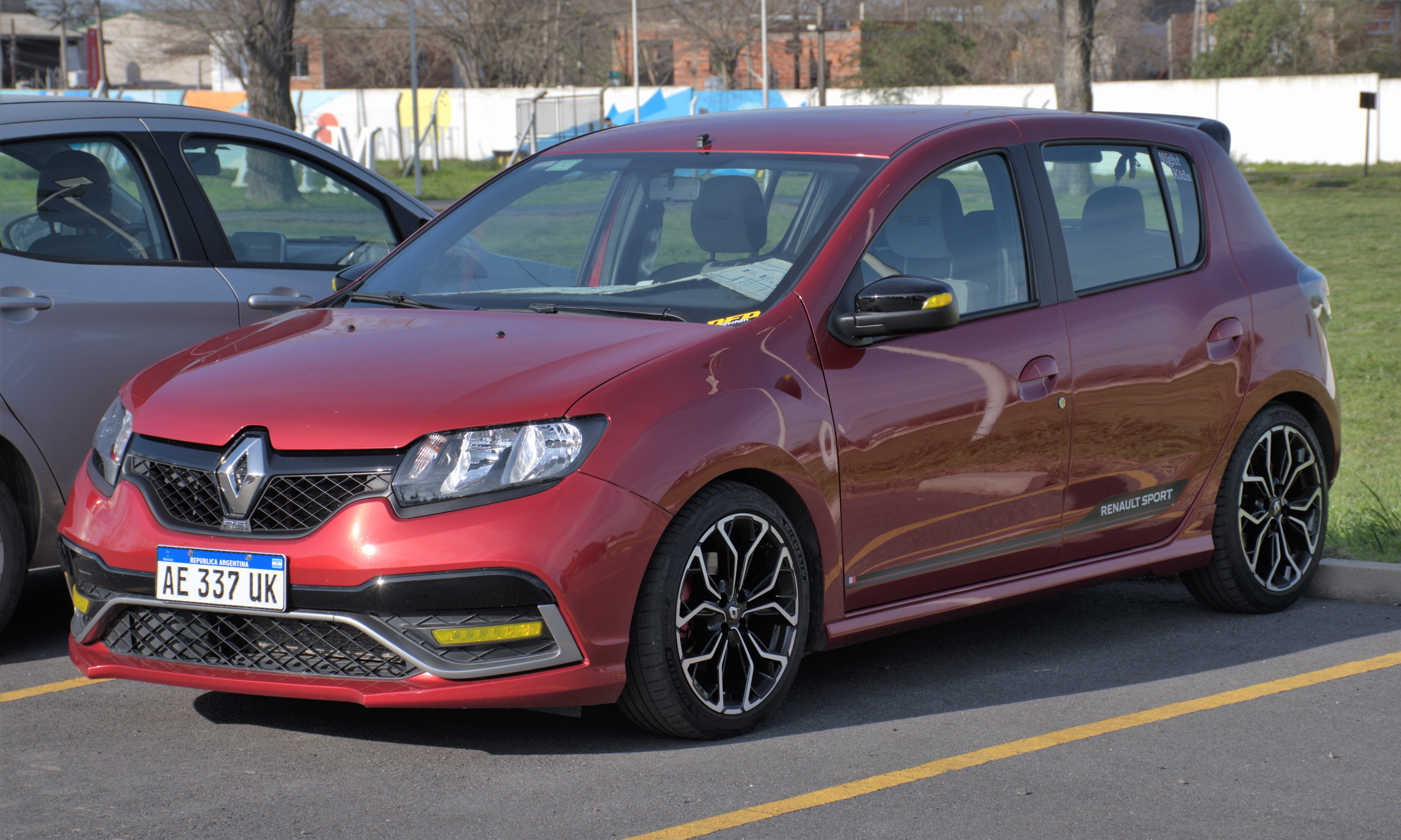
2020 Renault Sandero R.S.

In August 2014, Renault Sport CEO Patrice Ratti revealed to the Autocar magazine that a hot hatch R.S. version of Sandero was in the works. Using the 150 hp (110 kW) 2.0 16v F4R engine, and capable of accelerating from 0 to 100 km/h (62 mph) in 8.0 seconds and reaching a top speed of 202km/h (126mph), the Sandero R.S. is the first Renault Sport vehicle to be manufactured outside France. It was released in September 2015 in Brazil, different from the normal versions with three types of ECU control: normal, sport and sport+, four disc brakes with ABS, a steering wheel taken from the Clio R.S., electronic stability program and a six speed manual transmission.

It later came in Mexico on 21 October 2019.

The Sandero RS was discontinued at the end of 2021 because of tighter Brazilian emissions standards.

=== Facelift ===
The revised Dacia Sandero was released in November 2016 at the 2016 Paris Motor Show. On the outside, the facelifted version comes with LED daytime running lights and restyled taillights. Dacia has also updated its engine range with a 1.0-litre, three-cylinder petrol that sits in the entry-level trims, replacing the old 1.2-litre unit.

Another facelift was announced in July 2019, to be introduced for the following model year, but only for the Renault-badged model, produced in Brazil. This upgrade brings a slightly revised front end and a more significantly redesigned rear end. While the front end is identical with the facelifted Romanian or Moroccan-built Renault Sandero sold in regions outside Latin America, the rear end is majorly revised with the rear tail lights extends to the tailgate, just like the Talisman. This facelift was not sold in Mexico since it was replaced by the smaller Kwid hatchback, therefore only the Stepway (as the Renault Stepway, without Sandero badging) and R.S. versions of the Sandero were sold there. It was replaced by the Kardian in 2024.

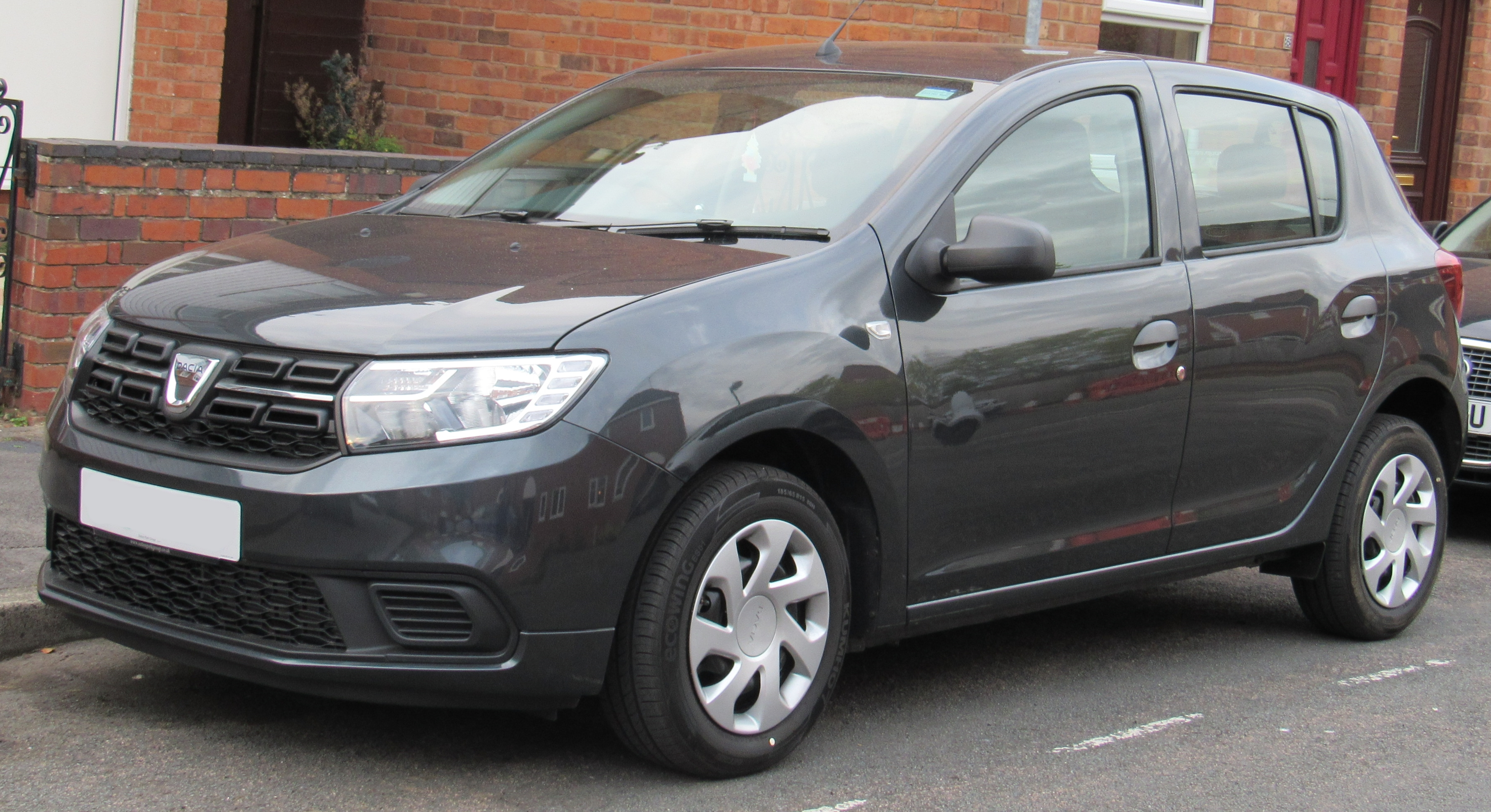
Dacia Sandero (2016 facelift)

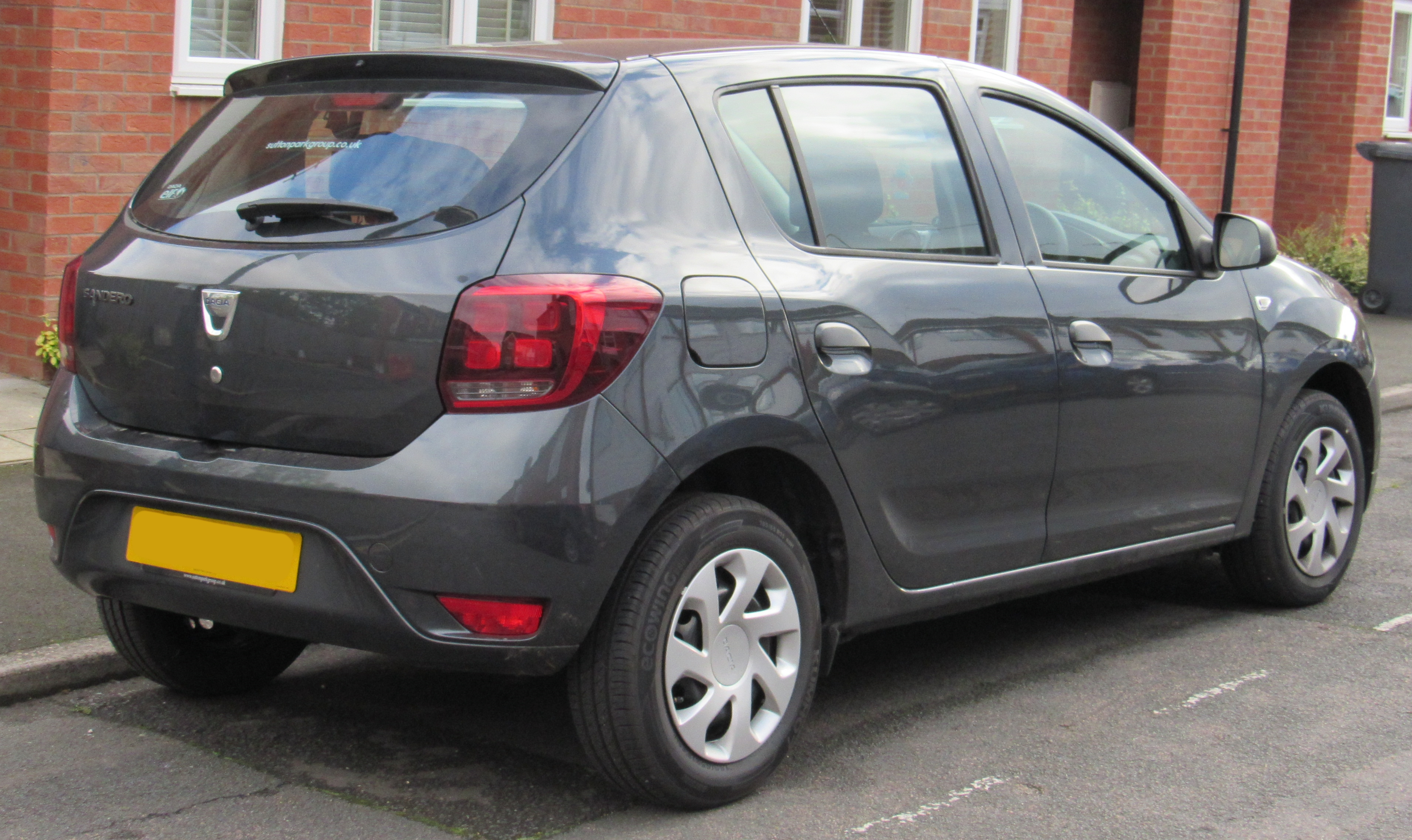
Dacia Sandero (2016 facelift)

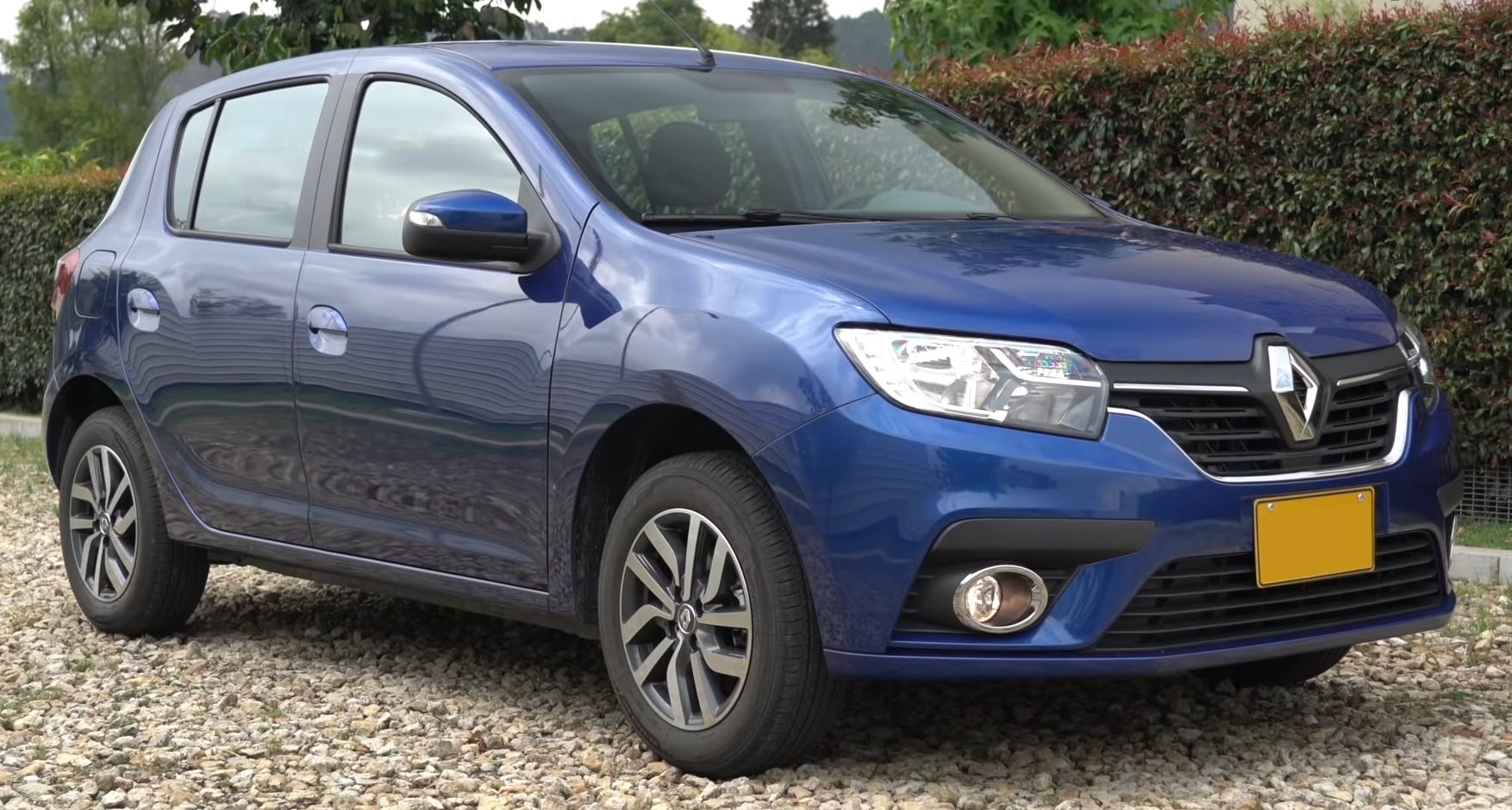
Renault Sandero (Latin American version, 2019 facelift)

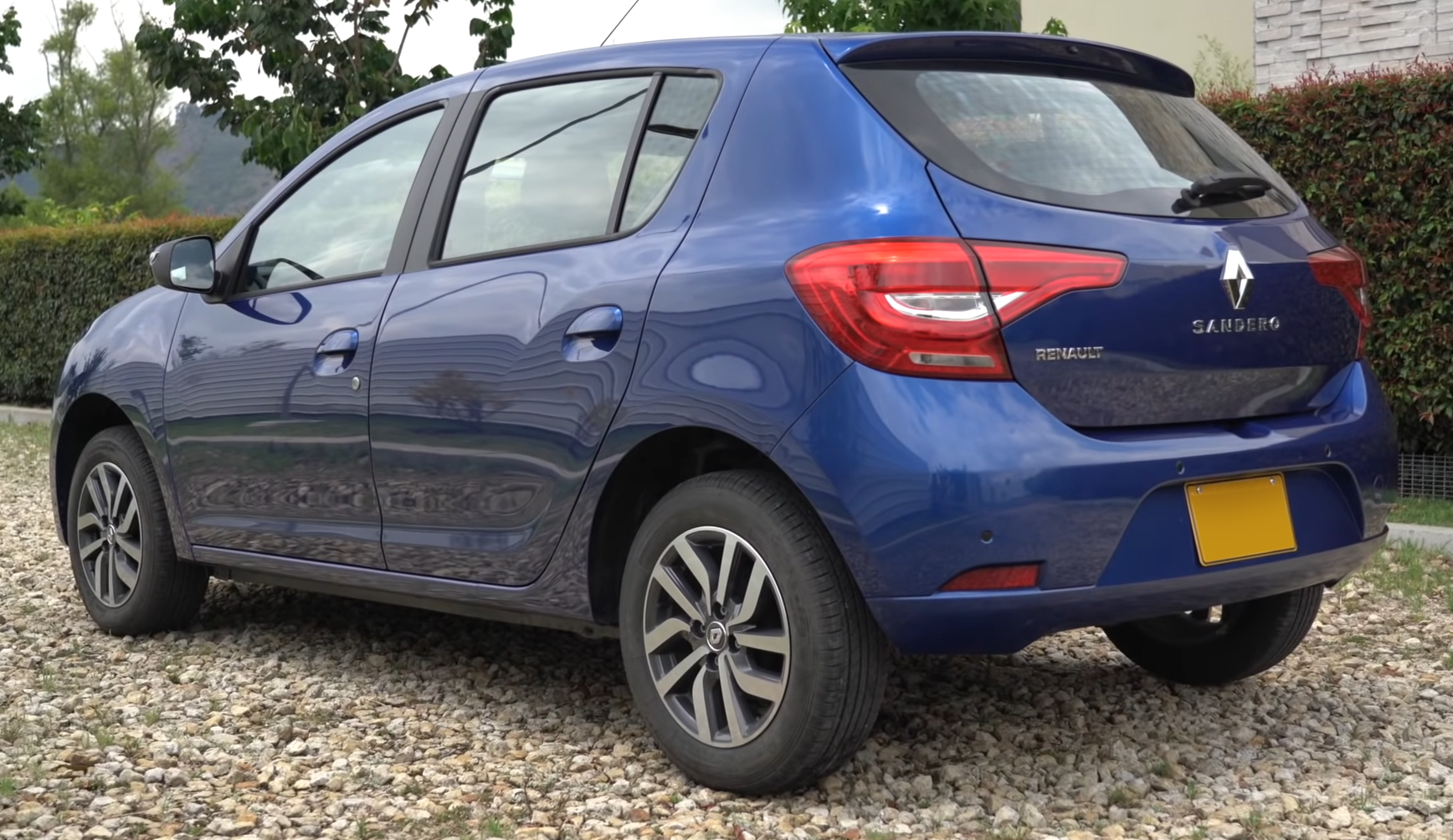
Renault Sandero (Latin American version, 2019 facelift)

=== Awards and reception ===
In January 2013, British magazine What Car? awarded the second generation Sandero as the Best supermini less than £12,000, noting that "it offers something genuinely new and different in that it brings real space for bargain prices". What Car? awarded the Sandero again in 2014 and 2015.

Auto Express assessed a 4 out of 5 to the Sandero Stepway.

== Third generation (BJI; 2020) ==
Sandero III
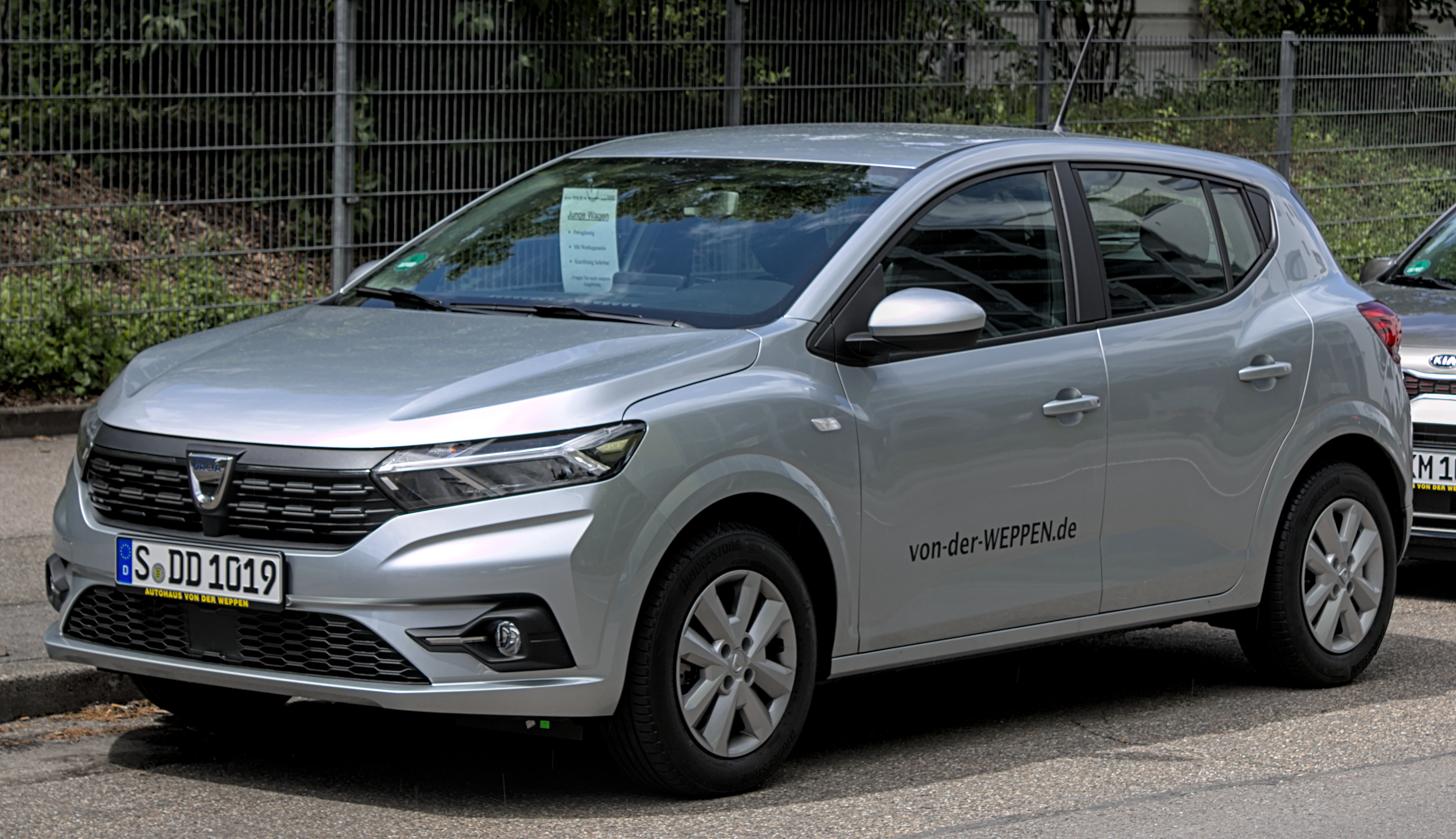

Overview
- Model code: BJI
- Also called: Dacia Sandero Streetway (Italy, Greece and Morocco)
- Production: 2020–present
- Assembly: Morocco: Casablanca (Somaca); Tangier (Renault Tanger Méditerranée); Romania: Mioveni (Stepway; 2020–2025)
- Designer: Erde Tungaa (exterior); Maxime Pinol (interior)

Body and chassis
- Platform: Renault–Nissan CMF-B LS platform
- Related: Dacia Logan III; Dacia Jogger; Renault Taliant; Renault Kardian

Powertrain
- Engine: Petrol: 1.0 L H4D SCe 65 I3 12V; 1.0 L H4Dt TCe 90 I3 12V turbo; Petrol LPG: 1.0 L H4Dt ECO-G 100 I3 12V turbo; Diesel: 1.5 L K9K I4 8v turbo (only in Moldova)
- Transmission: 5-speed manual 6-speed manual CVT

Dimensions
- Wheelbase: 2,604 mm (102.5 in)
- Length: 4,088–4,099 mm (160.9–161.4 in)
- Width: 1,758 mm (69.2 in)
- Height: 1,499–1,535 mm (59.0–60.4 in)

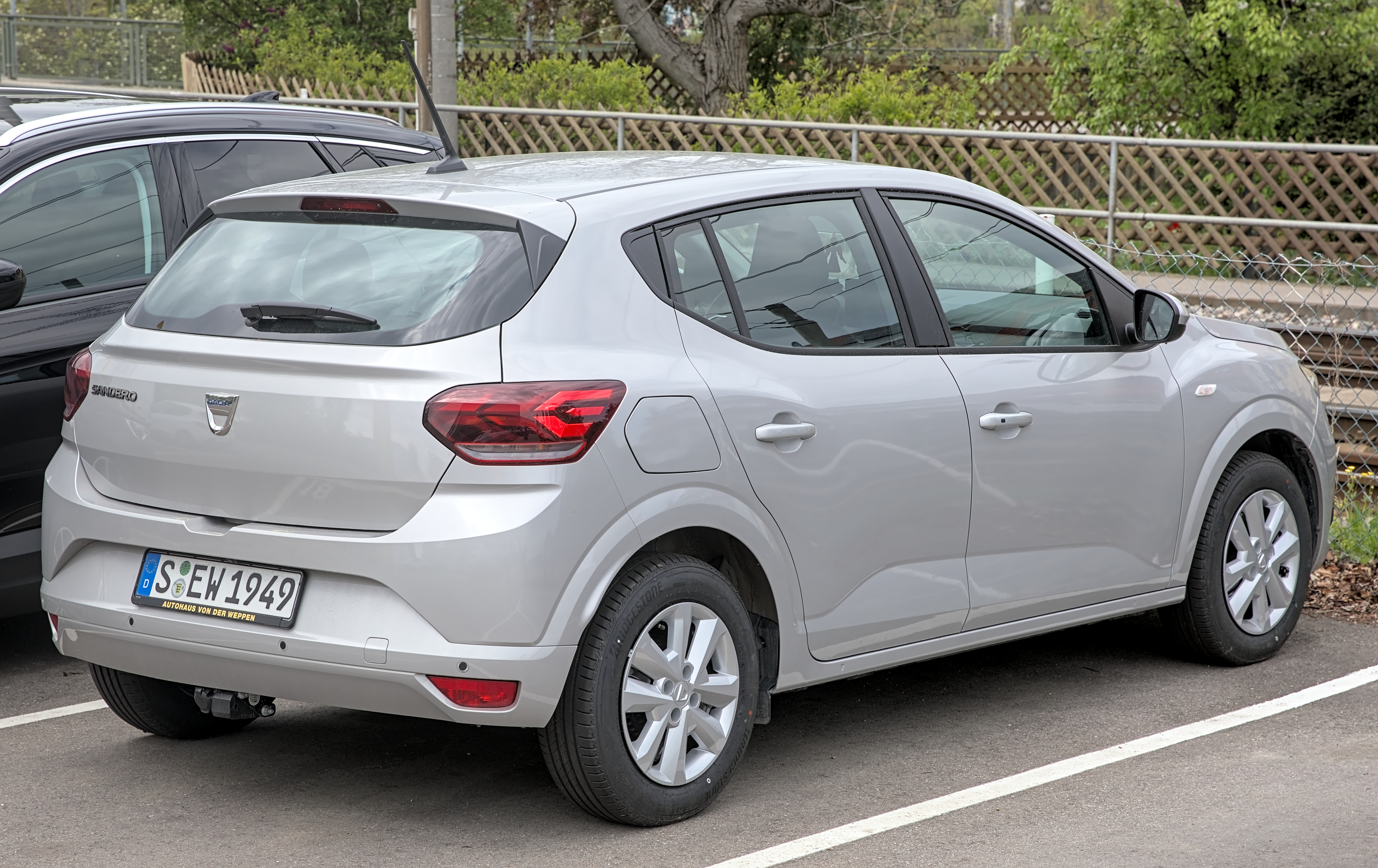
Rear view

The third generation of Dacia Sandero and Sandero Stepway was launched together with the new Dacia Logan III, on 29 September 2020. The car is based on the low-spec version of the CMF-B platform and was presented on 7 September 2020.

The third-generation Sandero is exclusively available with three-cylinder engines. The entry-level one is a naturally aspirated 1.0-litre with 65 hp (48 kW) and a 5-speed manual. The top-end trims received a turbocharged 1.0-litre with 90 hp (66 kW) and a choice between a 6-speed manual or CVT. The more powerful version of the engine, badged as ECO-G 100 Bi-Fuel received 100 hp (74 kW) and a 6-speed manual transmission.

The lower-spec cars get a modular multimedia system dubbed "Media Control" with removable smartphone support while the upper trims have an integrated 8-inch touchscreen with support for Android Auto and Apple CarPlay.

It is also equipped with electric power steering, LED headlights, emergency brake assist, blind-spot warning, park assist (with front and rear sensors, rearview camera), hill start assist, keyless entry, heated front seats, automatic air conditioning with digital display, reverse camera, electric parking brake, automatic wipers, a remote boot release and electric glass sunroof as standard or optional, depending on the market.

=== 2022 refresh ===
In June 2022, the Sandero received a slight restyling incorporating the brand's new logo alongside other Dacia models. To accommodate the new logo, the grille is redesigned, and the steering wheel is slightly modified.

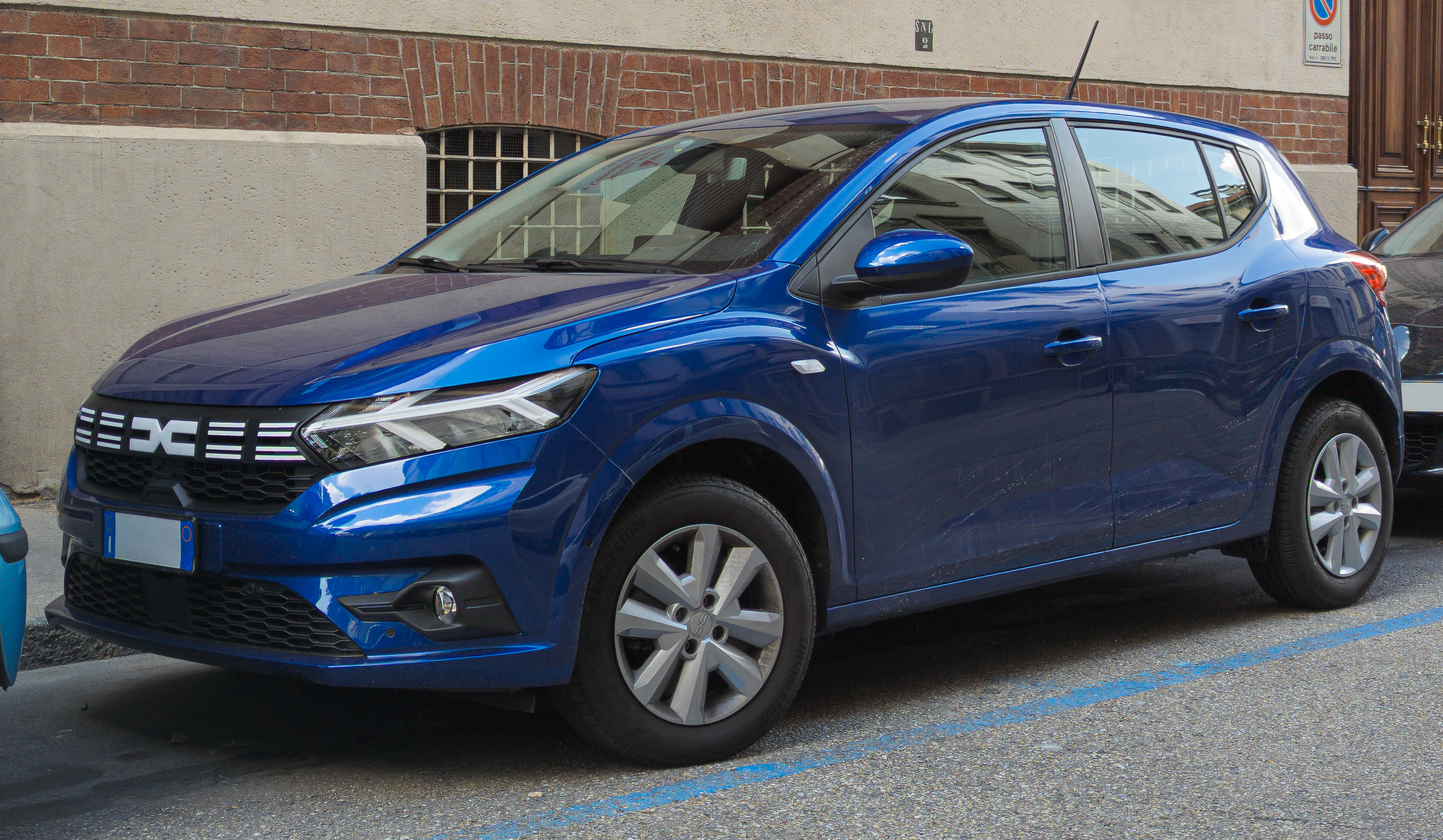
first Facelift

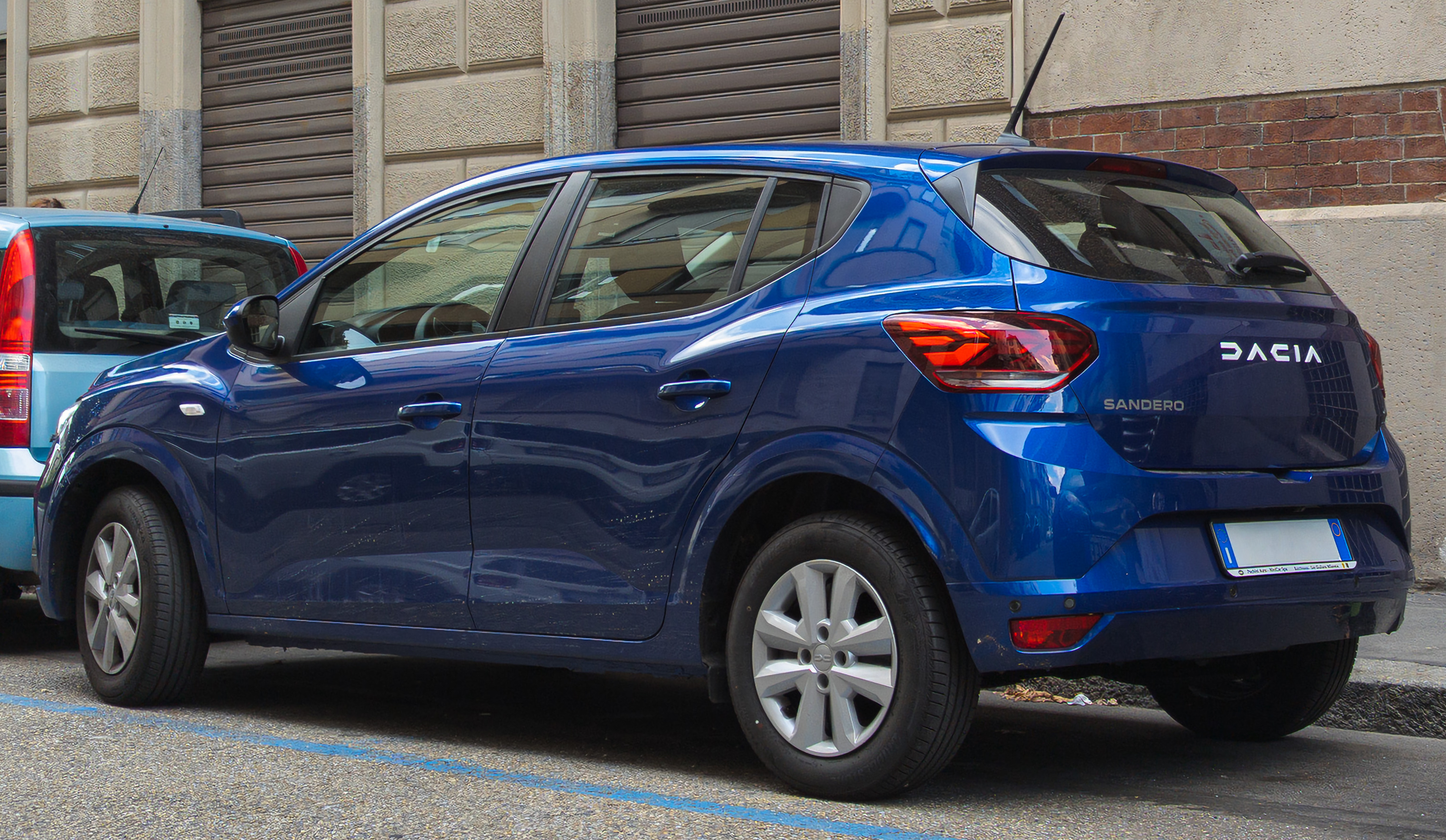
first Facelift

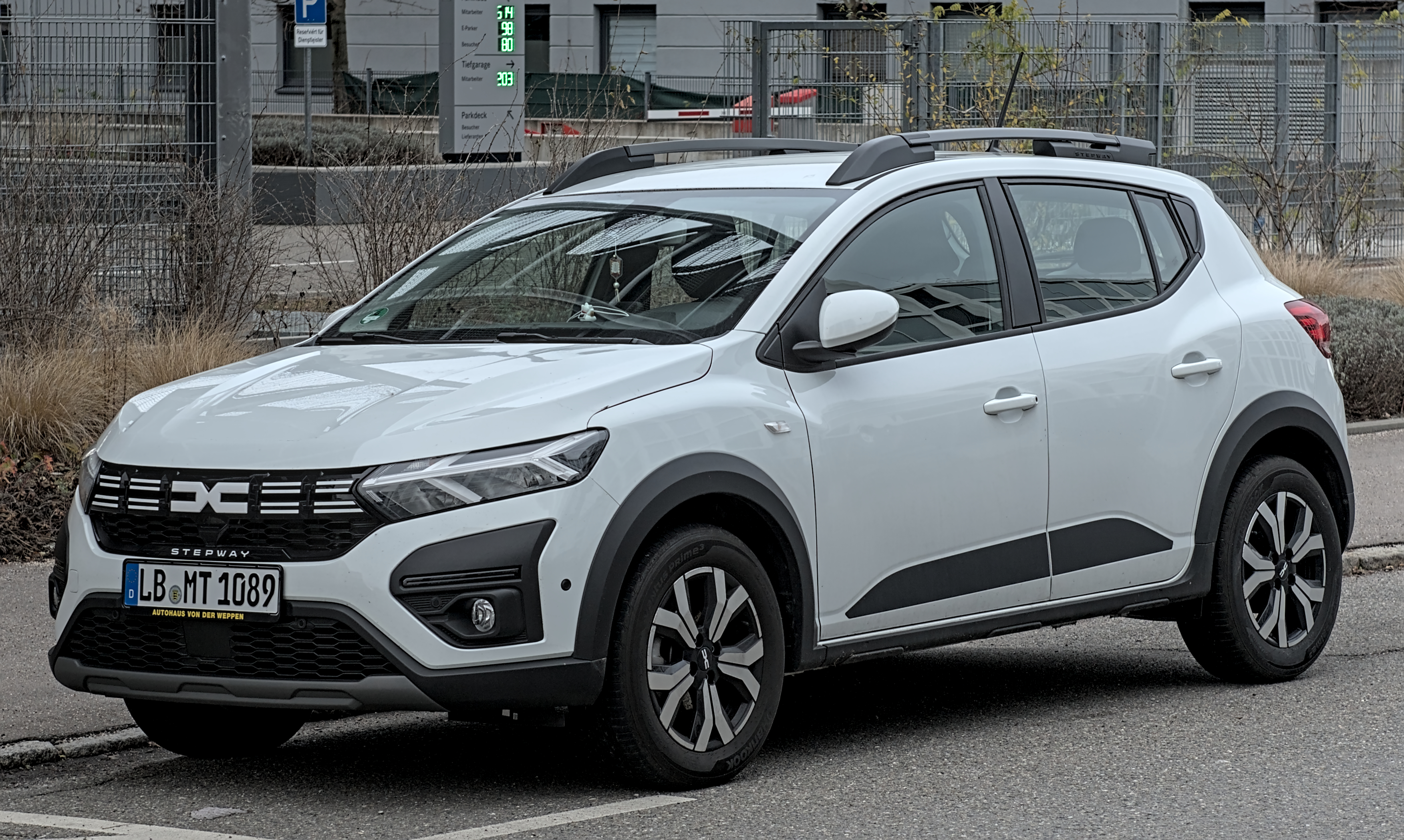
Sandero Stepway (first facelift)

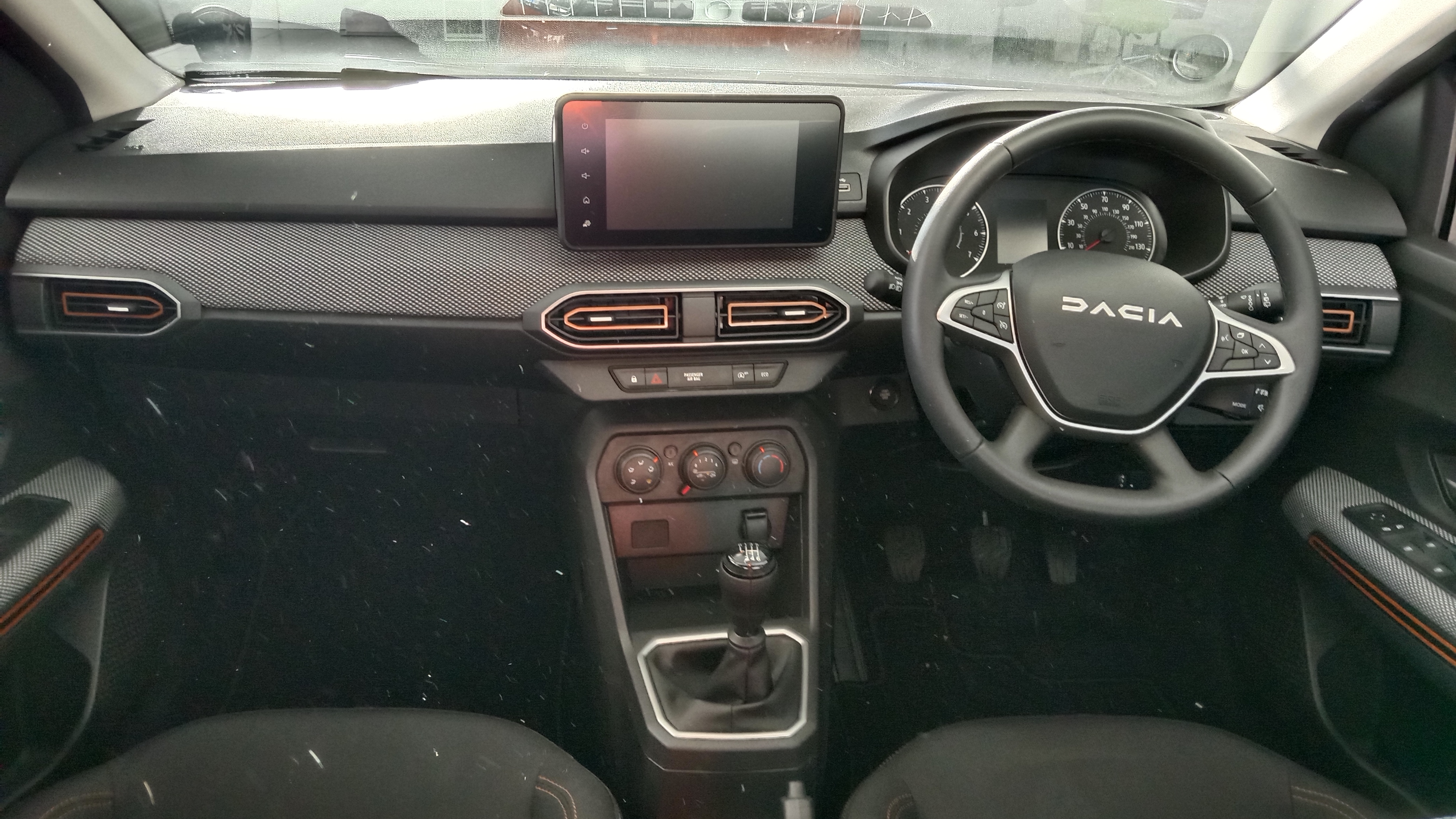
Interior (first facelift)

=== 2025 refresh ===
On 6 October 2025, the Sandero and Sandero Stepway alongside the Logan and Jogger, received a facelift featuring a redesigned front fascia, new headlights, new fog lights, new alloys, new infotainment and new steering wheel, while the rear received slight updates. It also received a new 1.2L direct injection turbocharged engine, available in bi-fuel (petrol/LPG) configuration, marketed as ECO-G 120. It seems to be the same engine found in the Renault Clio VI of the same year. This engine can be paired with a 6-speed manual transmission, or, for the first time, a 6-speed wet-clutch EDC, which is Renault's DCT system.

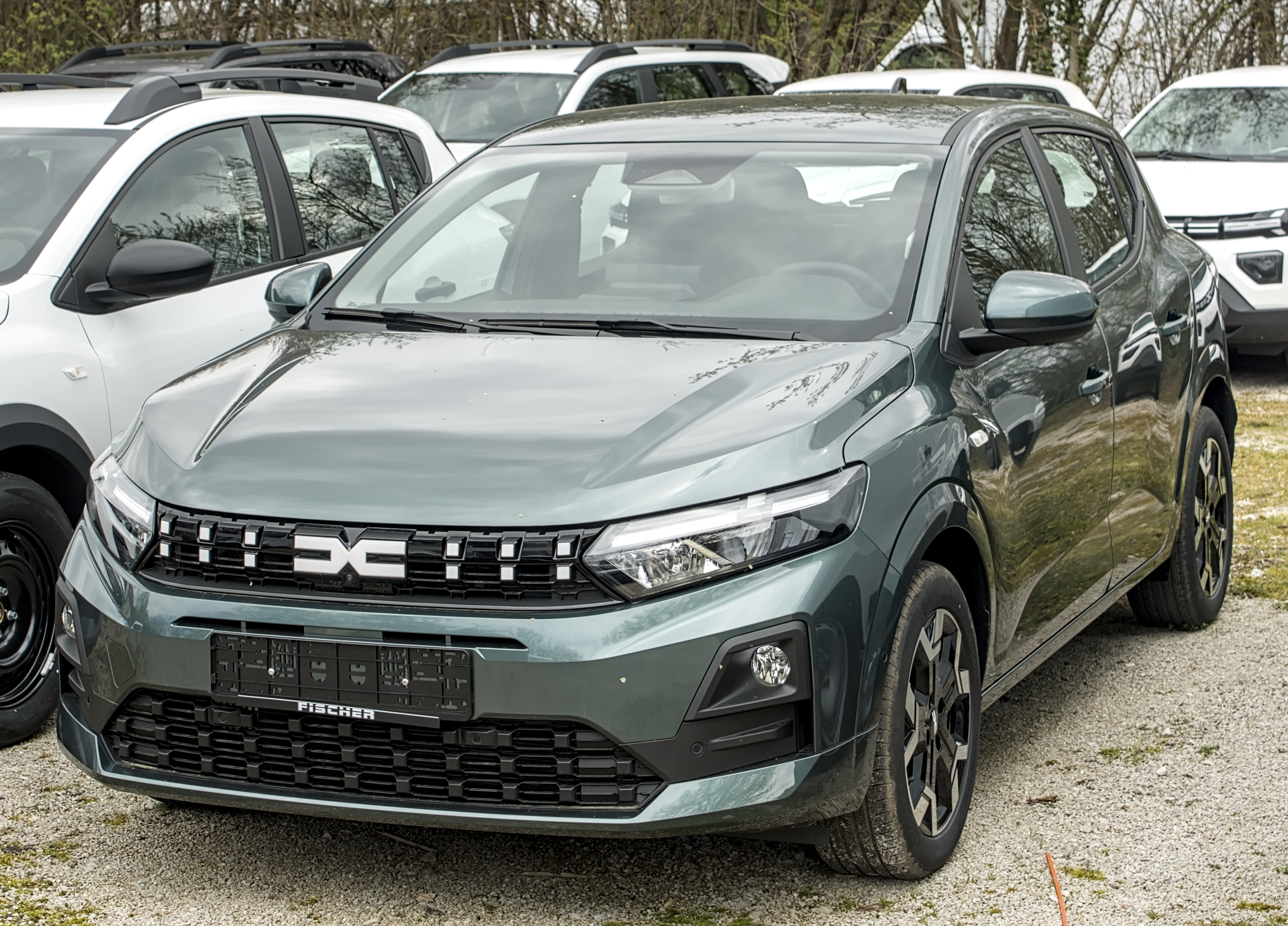
second facelift

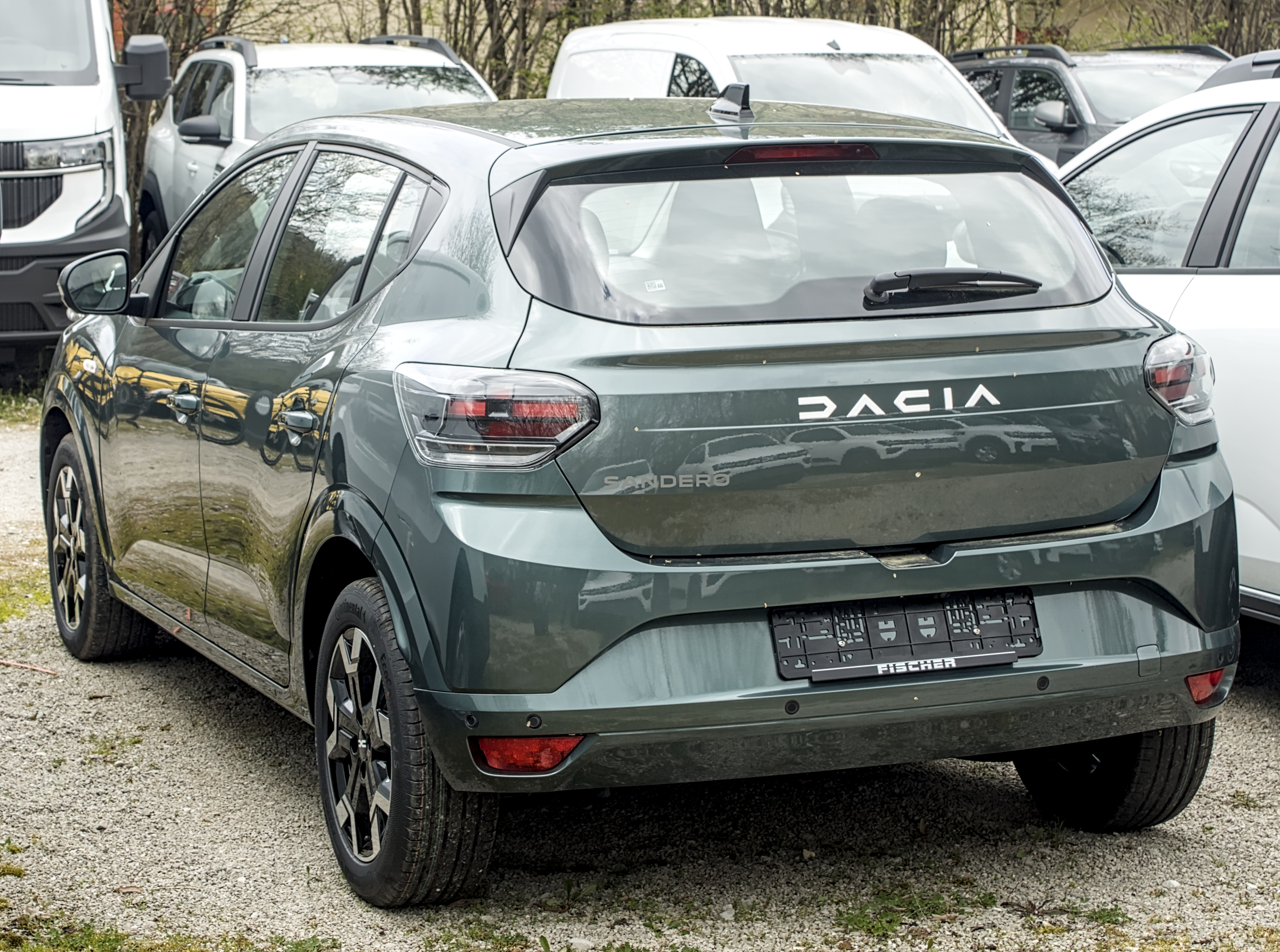
second facelift

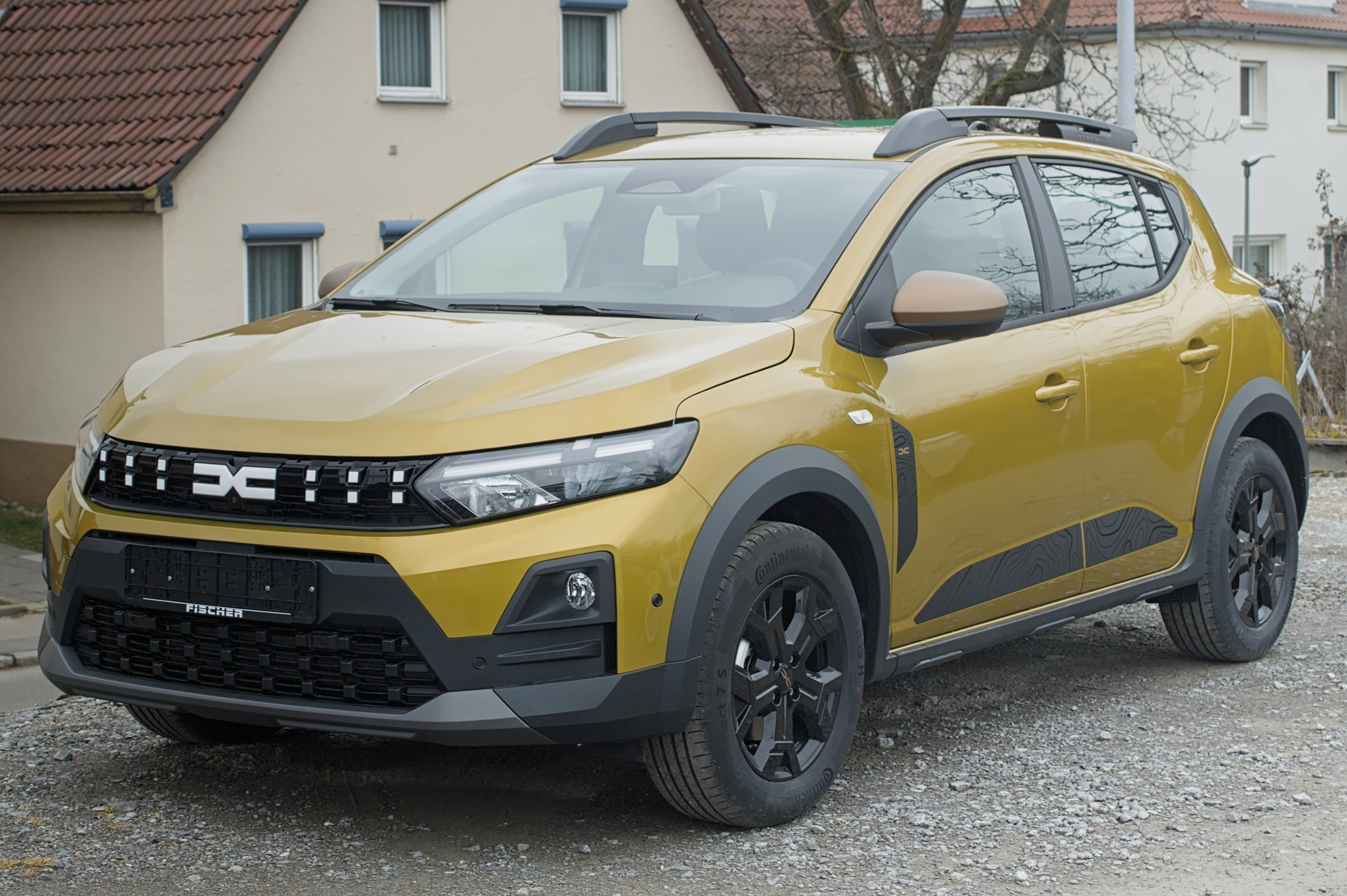
Sandero Stepway (second facelift)

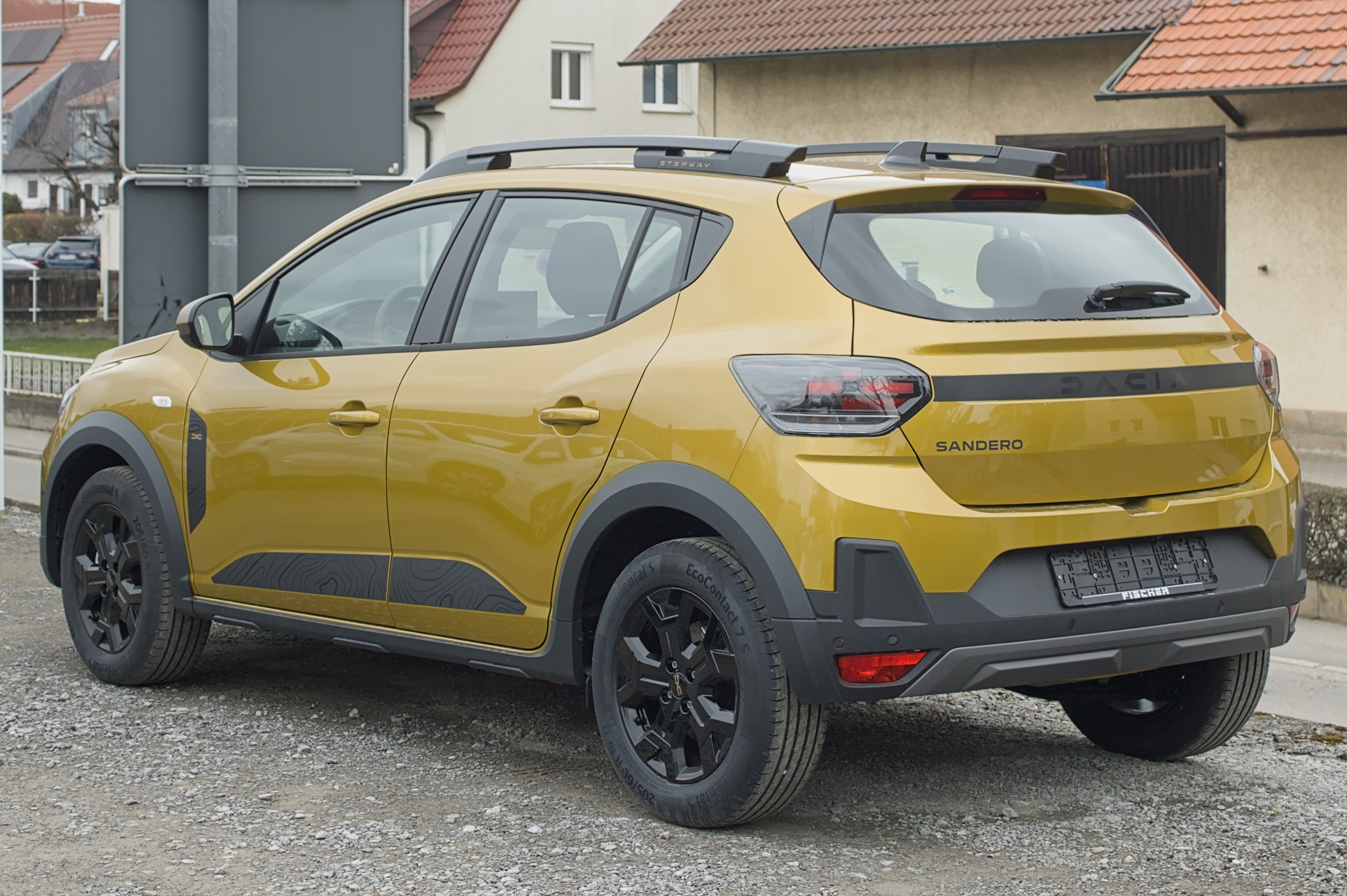
Sandero Stepway (second facelift)

=== Engines ===
==== Sandero ====
Engine	Production	Code	Displ.	Power	Torque	Top speed	0–100 km/h (0-62 mph)	Combined consumption	CO_{2} emissions
Petrol engines
SCe 65 FAP	2020-2026	B4D	999 cc	65 hp (48 kW) at 6300 rpm	95 N⋅m (70 lb⋅ft) at 3600 rpm	158 km/h (98 mph)	16.7 s	5.4 L/100 km (52 mpg_{‑imp})	121 g/km
TCe 90 FAP		H4Dt	999 cc	90 hp (66 kW) at 4600 rpm	160 N⋅m (118 lb⋅ft) at 2100 rpm	172–179 km/h (107–111 mph)	11.7–12.2 s	5.3 L/100 km (53 mpg_{‑imp})	120–127 g/km
TCe 90 CVT FAP		H4Dt	999 cc	90 hp (66 kW) at 4500 rpm	142 N⋅m (105 lb⋅ft) at 1750 rpm	163–170 km/h (101–106 mph)	13.4–14.2 s	5.8 L/100 km (49 mpg_{‑imp})	132–140 g/km
Petrol and LPG engines
ECO-G 100 Bi-Fuel		H4Dt	999 cc	100 hp (74 kW) at 5000 rpm	170 N⋅m (125 lb⋅ft) at 2000 rpm	177–183 km/h (110–114 mph)	11.6–11.9 s	7.1 L/100 km (40 mpg_{‑imp})	109–115 g/km
ECO-G 120 Bi-Fuel		HR12	1199cc	115 hp (85 kW) at 4500-5500 rpm in petrol mode 120 hp (88 kW) at 4500-5000 rpm in LPG mode	190 N⋅m (140 lb⋅ft) at 2000-4000 rpm in petrol mode 197 N⋅m (145 lb⋅ft) at 1750-3750 rpm in LPG mode	180 km/h (112 mph) (with factory electronic speed limiter)	11.1 s in petrol mode 10.1 s in LPG mode	5.2–5.5 L/100 km (54–51 mpg_{‑imp}) in petrol mode 6.6–6.9 L/100 km (43–41 mpg_{‑imp}) in LPG mode	122-127 g/km in petrol mode 108-113 g/km in LPG mode

=== Stepway ===
A crossover-look version of the Sandero dubbed the Sandero Stepway continued for the third generation. The TCe 110 engine from the Dacia Jogger is also available exclusively on the Sandero Stepway.

Production of the Sandero Stepway at the Mioveni plant in Romania ended in 2025, with the factory subsequently concentrating on the Duster and Bigster.

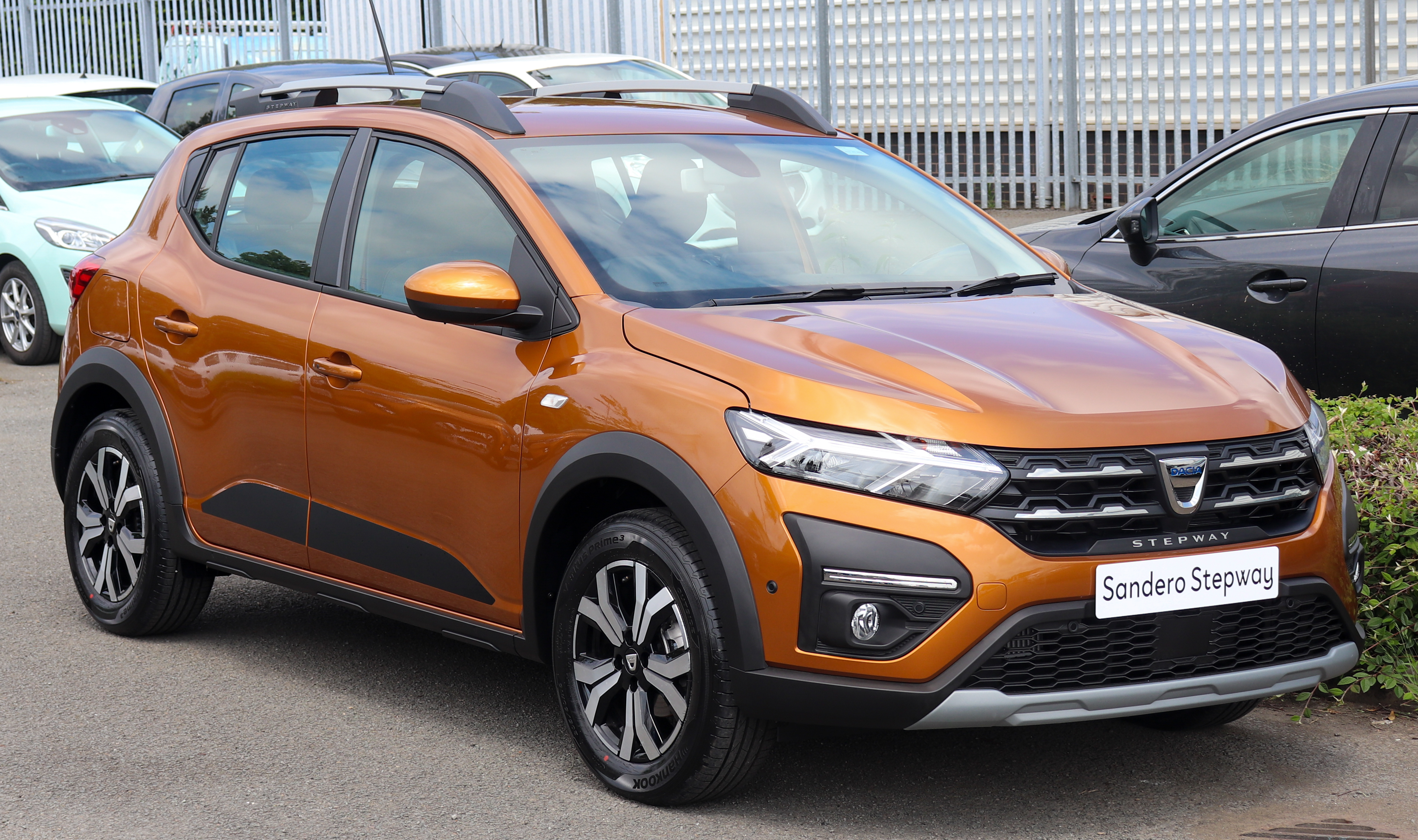
Dacia Sandero Stepway

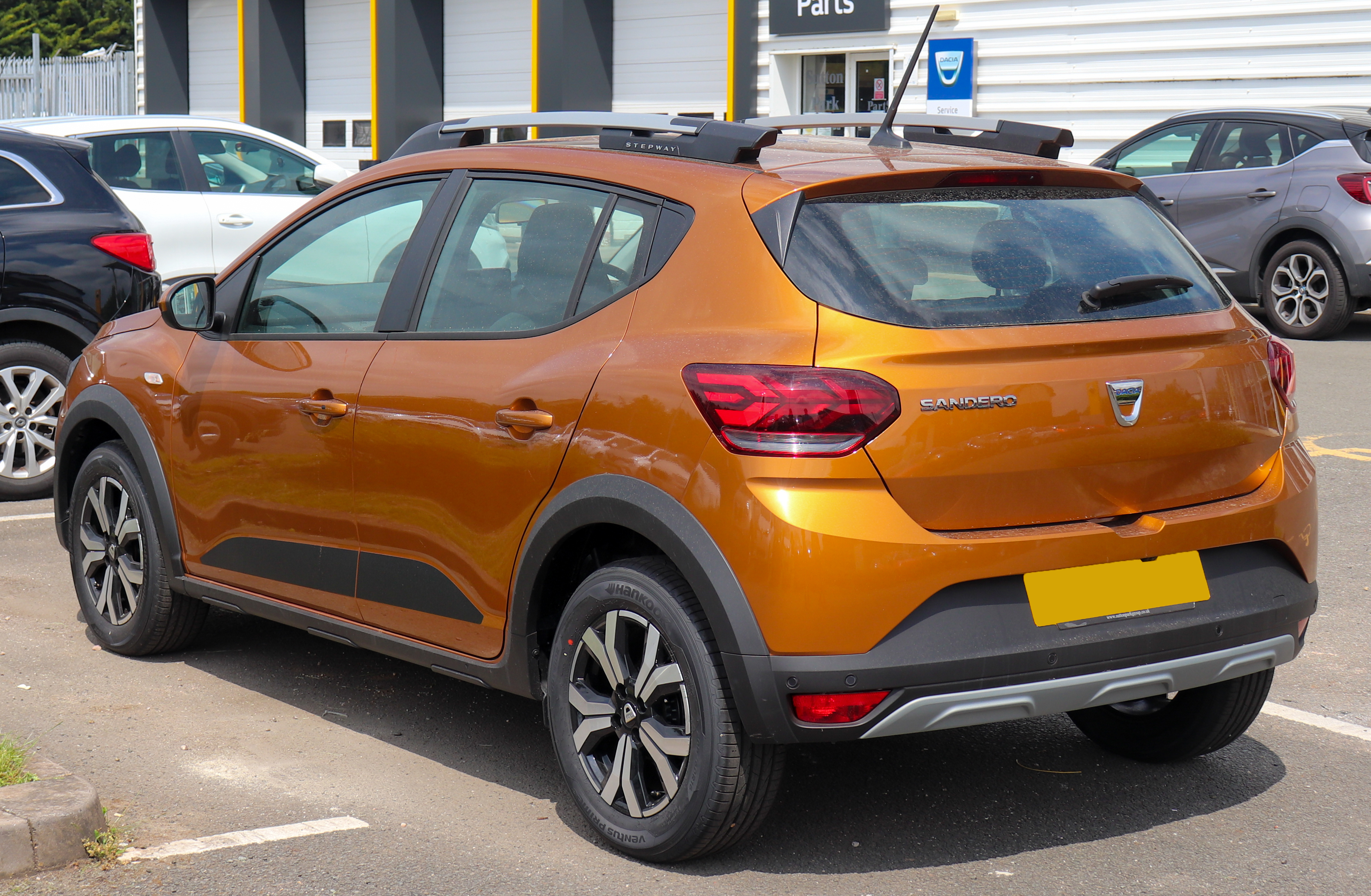
Rear view

=== Renault Sandero ===
The Sandero, along with the Logan, was supposed to launch in Russia in 2022, but this was never completed due to the Russian invasion of Ukraine. However, some camouflaged prototypes were photographed at the former Renault factory in Moscow, now Moskvitch.

=== Safety ===
Euro NCAP test results Dacia Sandero Stepway 1.0 TCe (LHD) (2021)
Test	Points	%
Overall:	2 /5 stars	
Adult occupant:	26.9	70%
Child occupant:	35.6	72%
Pedestrian:	22.2	41%
Safety assist:	6.8	42%

== Top Gear ==
The Sandero was the focus of a running joke on the British television programme Top Gear. In Series 11 and Series 12, after Dacia sent the show a press kit, presenter James May would often exclaim "Good News!" and explain a fact about the Sandero during the show's news segment, to which Jeremy Clarkson would reply "Great!" before abruptly changing the subject. On one occasion, May exclaimed "Bad news!" and stated that the Sandero had been delayed, to which Clarkson, in a response that has since become a popular internet meme, replied "Oh, no! Anyway [...]"

The joke was also featured in The Big Book of Top Gear, with a page proclaiming "Good News! The Dacia Sandero is in this book!" In Series 12, the presenters switched sides of the joke, with Clarkson bringing up news about the car and May shrugging it off. In the fourth episode of Series 12, when May said he had "Good News", Clarkson immediately asked "Is it the Dacia Sandero?", to which a seemingly bewildered May replied, "No [...]" The car was not mentioned during the news segment for the remainder of the series.

In Series 14, during a visit to Romania, Clarkson bought May a used Sandero as a gift. After returning from a test drive, May parked the car behind an idling lorry and exited. As May praised the car to his co-presenters, the lorry reversed into the Sandero, damaging the passenger side. The joke was continued in Series 15, except this time referring to the Dacia Duster, and in Series 18, when May brought up the new Dacia Lodgy. The joke returned in the first and third episodes of Series 19, as well as the second and fifth episodes of Series 20.

The second generation Sandero was featured alongside the Ford Fiesta and Volkswagen Up! in series 21 as part of a 1.0-litre, three-cylinder cars challenge, which ended with Clarkson (Up!) and May (Sandero) having to drive into the abandoned city of Pripyat, with Richard Hammond's Fiesta having already run out of fuel. The Sandero was the only car to make it back out and complete all the challenges. (Technically, the challenge was to run out of fuel before reaching Pripyat, so Hammond in his Fiesta was successful at this last challenge.) May pointed out the large price difference between the Fiesta and the Sandero, stating that at £17,500 vs. £7,500 he could afford to lose his car, buy another, and still be better off than Hammond.

Despite the comical and sarcastic nature of the recurring bit, May has stated that he has a genuine affinity for the Sandero. According to some sources, its second generation was intended to become a fourth Reasonably Priced Car on Top Gear, however its use was prevented due to its delayed release in Britain.

In 2021, following his time on Top Gear, May filmed a favorable review of the Sandero for the DriveTribe YouTube channel.

== Sales ==
Year	Europe	Brazil	Colombia	Mexico		
Year	Europe	Brazil	Colombia	Sandero	Stepway	R.S.
2007		279				
2008	25,947	39,631				
2009	138,179	49,381				
2010	138,014	68,812		5,238	3,741	
2011	71,647	81,782		3,496	4,444	
2012	73,515	98,453		1,320	3,373	
2013	121,169	102,520		726	2,597	
2014	138,709	95,385		730	3,044	
2015	147,497	77,838		642	2,701	
2016	167,766	63,232		2,444	3,783	246
2017	194,996	67,352		1,331	4,853	70
2018	211,680	52,406		424	2,981	
2019	223,186	50,303			2,981	52
2020	167,032	26,347			2,065	96
2021	193,486	12,443				
2022	201,978	10,628	15,667			
2023	234,715	7,860				
2024		4,633				
