= Renault Tanger Méditerranée =

Automobile manufacturing plant in Morocco

Renault Tanger Méditerranée S.A.
- Company type: Joint venture
- Industry: Automotive
- Founded: 2008
- Headquarters: Tangier, Morocco
- Area served: Europe, Africa, Asia
- Products: Automobiles
- Owner: S.A. Caisse de Dépôt et de Gestion (47.6%); Renault SAS (52.4%)
- Number of employees: 5,086 (December 31, 2014)

Renault Tanger Méditerranée is an industrial site of the Renault Group, located in the town of Malloussa near Tangier.

== History ==
The factory was opened on February 9, 2012, inaugurated by the King of Morocco, Mohammed VI, in the presence of then Renault Group CEO Carlos Ghosn. Around one billion euros were invested in the construction of the plant.

It produces the Dokker, Express, Sandero (since September 2013) and Lodgy, sold in Morocco or exported mainly to Europe (about 90 to 95% to the EU), Africa and the MENA region. On July 10, 2017, the plant celebrated its one millionth car produced in five years since opening.

The company is based in the free trade zone of the port city of Tangier. Due to the EU duty-free status, the vehicles cannot be exported to the countries of the Agadir Agreement.

A year before production began, the IFMIA (Institut de Formation aux Métiers de l'industrie Automobile), funded by the Moroccan state, was opened and plays a key role in training employees. CO_{2} emissions are said to be 98% lower compared to a similar plant.

== Production ==
=== Current production ===
- Dacia Logan Mk3 (2021–present)
- Dacia Sandero Mk3 (2021–present)
- Renault Express (2021–present)
- Dacia Jogger (2024–present)

=== Former production ===
- Dacia Lodgy (2012–2023)
- Dacia Dokker (2012–2021)
- Dacia Logan Mk2 (2012–2021)
- Dacia Sandero Mk2 (2012–2021)
- Dacia Logan MCV Mk2 (2017–2021)

=== Annual output ===
==== 2020 ====
- Lodgy: 26,937 units
- Sandero Mk2: 95,383 units
- Sandero Mk3: 8,627 units
- Dokker: 72,062 units
- Logan Mk2 MCV: 6,769 units
- Renault Express: 228 units
