= Stepway =

The Stepway is a crossover-styled trim level name for Dacia and Renault models.

It may refer to:

- Dacia/Renault Sandero Stepway
- Renault Stepway
- Dacia/Renault Logan Stepway
- Dacia/Renault Lodgy Stepway
- Dacia/Renault Dokker Stepway
