= Somaca =

Moroccan car manufacturer

- Type: Subsidiary
- Industry: Automotive
- Founded: 1959
- Founder: Fiat, Simca.
- Headquarters: Sidi Bernoussi, Casablanca, Morocco
- Area served: Europe, South America, Africa, Middle East, Asia-Pacific
- Key people: Fabrice Delecroix (Director)
- Products: ▲71 824 (2016)
- Revenue: ▲MAD 5.32 billion (2011)
- Owner: Renault S.A.S. (91%); Renault Maroc (8%); Private shareholders (1%)
- Number of employees: 1,200
- Parent: Renault
- Website: Official website

Somaca (Société marocaine de constructions automobiles) is a Moroccan car manufacturer founded in 1959 by Fiat company Simca and currently owned by the French company Renault.

== History ==
The company was founded in 1959 in by Moroccan government with technical assistance from Fiat S.p.A. and its French subsidiary, Simca. Fiat ended its production in the end of 2003 and 26% of the company was sold to Renault. In 2005 Renault bought the majority stake (54%) of Somaca from Fiat S.p.A. now totalling 80% stake.

== Factory ==
The factory has a covered area of 90,000 m^{2}. It has 1,200 employees and two production lines and assembles the Kangoo and the Kangoo Express (since 1999) for the local market, and the Dacia Logan (since 2005) for export to French and Spanish markets. Since 2009, SOMACA is also manufacturing the Sandero. That year it produced 41,236 vehicles.

== Other Renault operations in Morocco ==
In February 2012 Carlos Ghosn and king Mohammed VI inaugurated the Renault Tanger Méditerranée factory in Tangiers, specialised in the manufacturing of low-cost cars. It covers 300 hectares, with a production capacity projected to reach 400,000 units per year. The Moroccan press had announced that this target would be attained by 2013, however only 100,000 vehicles were produced between February 2012 and September 2013.

The Tangiers factory belongs to a company called "Renault Tanger Mediterranée", a joint venture between Fipar-Holding (a subsidiary of the Moroccan pension fund Caisse de dépôt et de gestion) which controls 47.6% of the shares and Renault SAS.

In addition to an initial investment in 2008-2009 of MAD1 billion of loans contracted from Moroccan banks, the factory was financed by a €400 million investment, with Fipar-Holding providing €200 million and €173.5 million from the Moroccan state through a loan from the European Investment Bank.

Renault cars in Morocco are distributed by Renault Maroc. a joint venture between Renault SAS and SNI (Mohammed VI's holding company) which controls 20% of shares.

Renault and Dacia cars in Morocco benefit from Non-tariff barriers to trade advantage; their cars are sold on a 7%VAT whereas other brands are sold on 20%VAT.
