= Renault Express (2020) =

Panel van and leisure activity vehicle (LAV)

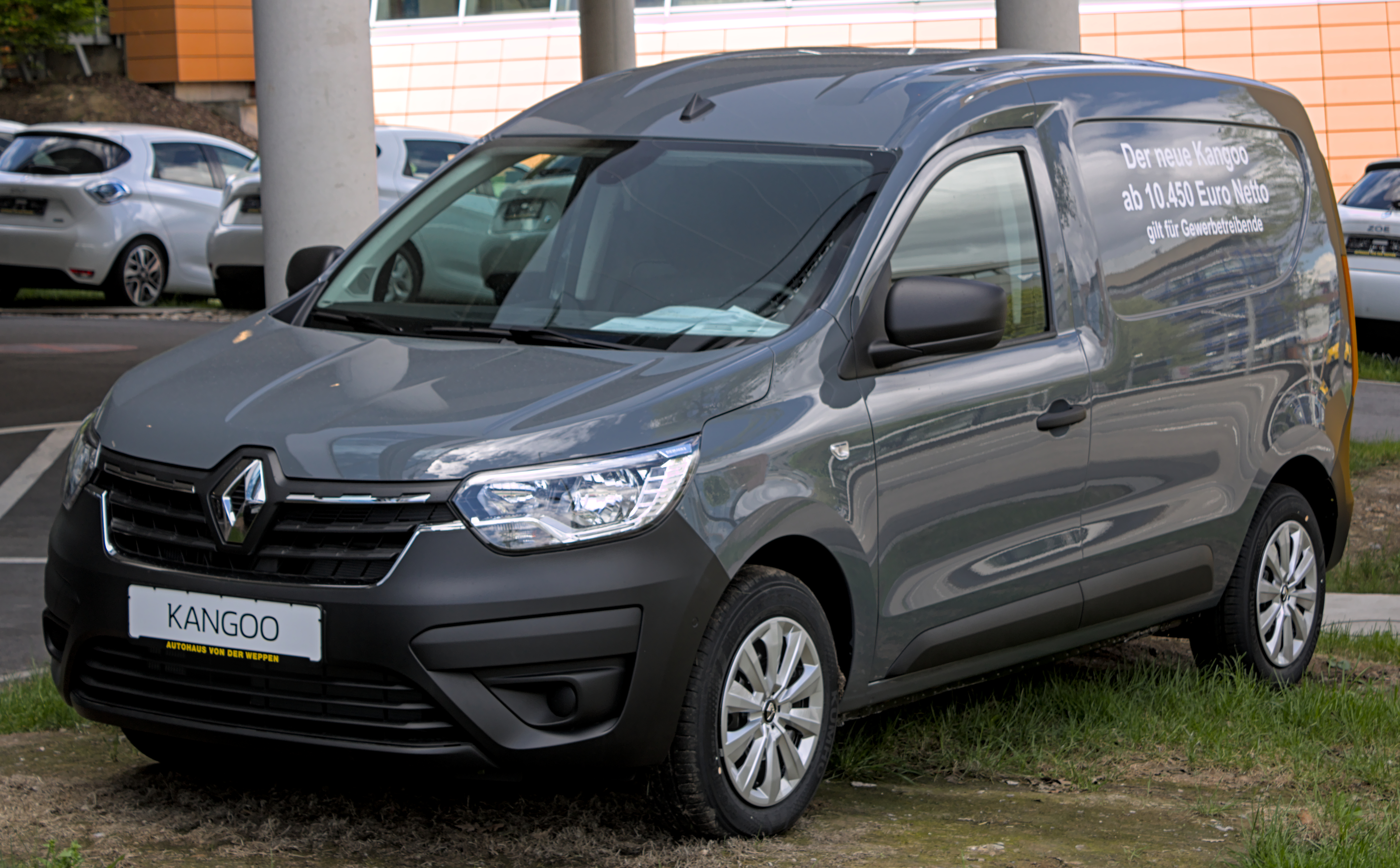
- Renault Express Van

Overview
- Manufacturer: Renault
- Also called: Renault Kangoo
- Production: 2021–present
- Assembly: Morocco: Tangier (Renault Med)
- Designer: Under the lead of Laurens van den Acker

Body and chassis
- Class: Leisure activity vehicle (Express); Panel van (Express Van)
- Body style: 5-door multi-purpose vehicle 4/5-door panel van
- Layout: Front-engine, front-wheel-drive
- Platform: Dacia M0 platform
- Related: Dacia Dokker; Renault Nueva Kangoo; Dacia Lodgy

Powertrain
- Engine: Petrol: 1.3 L H5Ht turbo I4; 1.6 L K4M 16V I4; Diesel: 1.5 L K9K dCi turbo I4
- Transmission: 5-speed manual 6-speed manual

Dimensions
- Wheelbase: 2,812 mm (110.7 in)
- Length: 4,393 mm (173.0 in)
- Width: 1,775 mm (69.9 in)
- Height: 1,811 mm (71.3 in)
- Curb weight: 1,298–1,389 kg (2,862–3,062 lb)

Chronology
- Predecessor: Renault Express; Dacia Dokker

The Renault Express is a panel van and leisure activity vehicle (LAV) manufactured and marketed by Renault since 2024 as a cheaper, work-oriented alternative to the Renault Kangoo. The Express is based on a revised Dacia Dokker.

== Overview ==
=== History ===
When the third generation Renault Kangoo was presented in November 2020, Renault also announced the expansion of its commercial vehicle range with a new model positioned as a lower-cost alternative to the Kangoo Van. Thus, the Express name, which had not been used since 2002, was revived.

For the new Express, Renault modernized the existing Dacia Dokker. It gained a new front bumper resembling Renault's other passenger car models, with a centrally placed company logo and long, slender shaped headlights. A new cockpit design was also introduced, containing storage compartments with a total capacity of 48 liters, and using an optional 8-inch Easy Link multimedia system screen. Moreover, the vehicle can be equipped with an inductive charger hidden in the armrest, 3 USB sockets, 4 12 V sockets, as well as a rear view camera and a blind spot monitoring system. Other parts of the body have undergone cosmetic changes, including remodeled LED taillights and redesigned door handles, while keeping the body, proportions, shapes of details, and embossing from the Dacia Dokker.

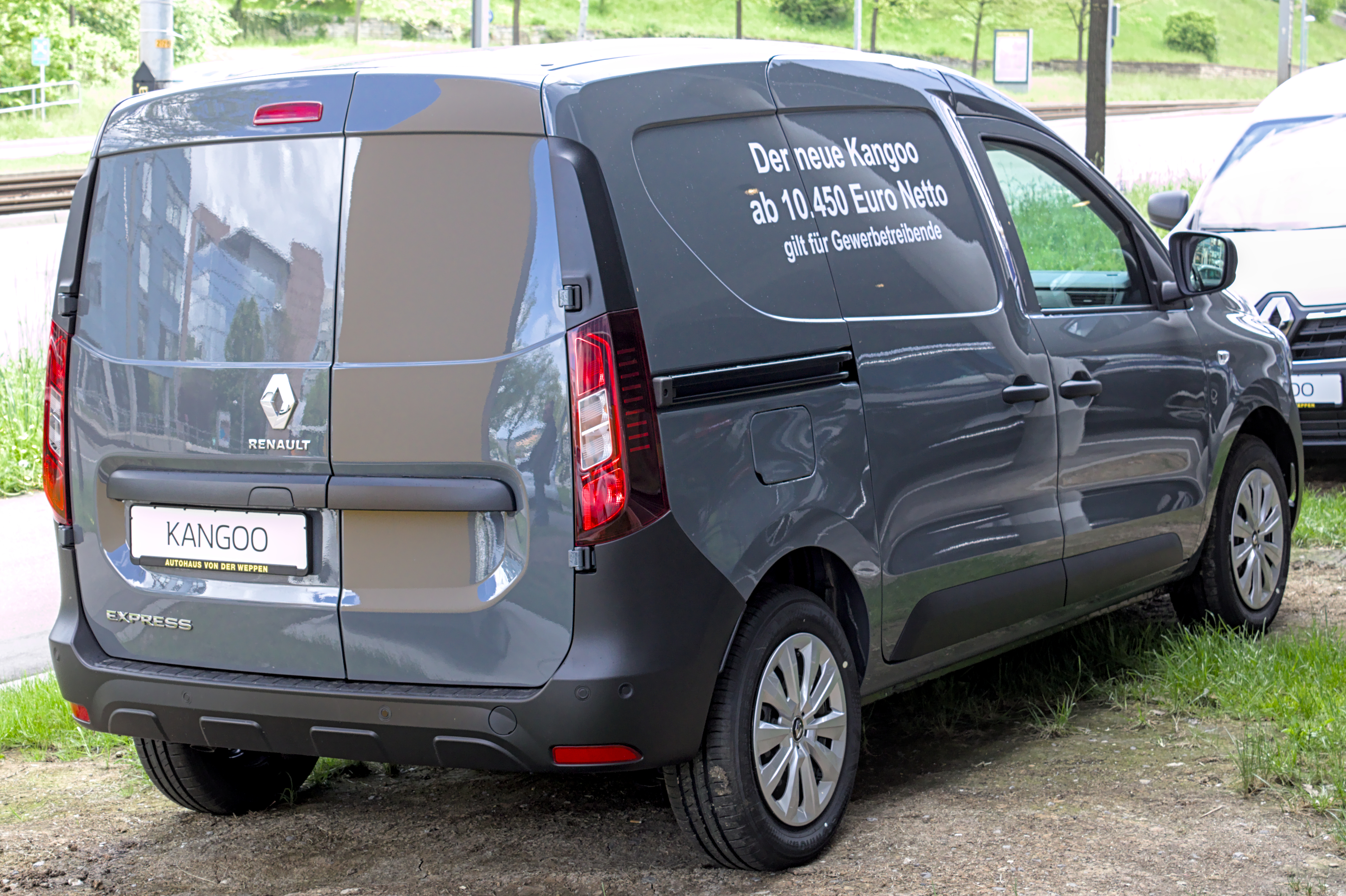
Rear view

=== Discontinuation ===
In July 2024, the Express Van ceased to be marketed in the European Union due to the implementation of new safety standards which required new, electronic driver assistance system. The Express' low price and moderate sales numbers did not justify the necessary investment to keep the model alive in this region.

== Production ==
Calendar year	Total production
2020	228
2021	38,777
2022	72,448
2023	84,856
2024	49,052
