= Renault Express =

Panel van built by Renault

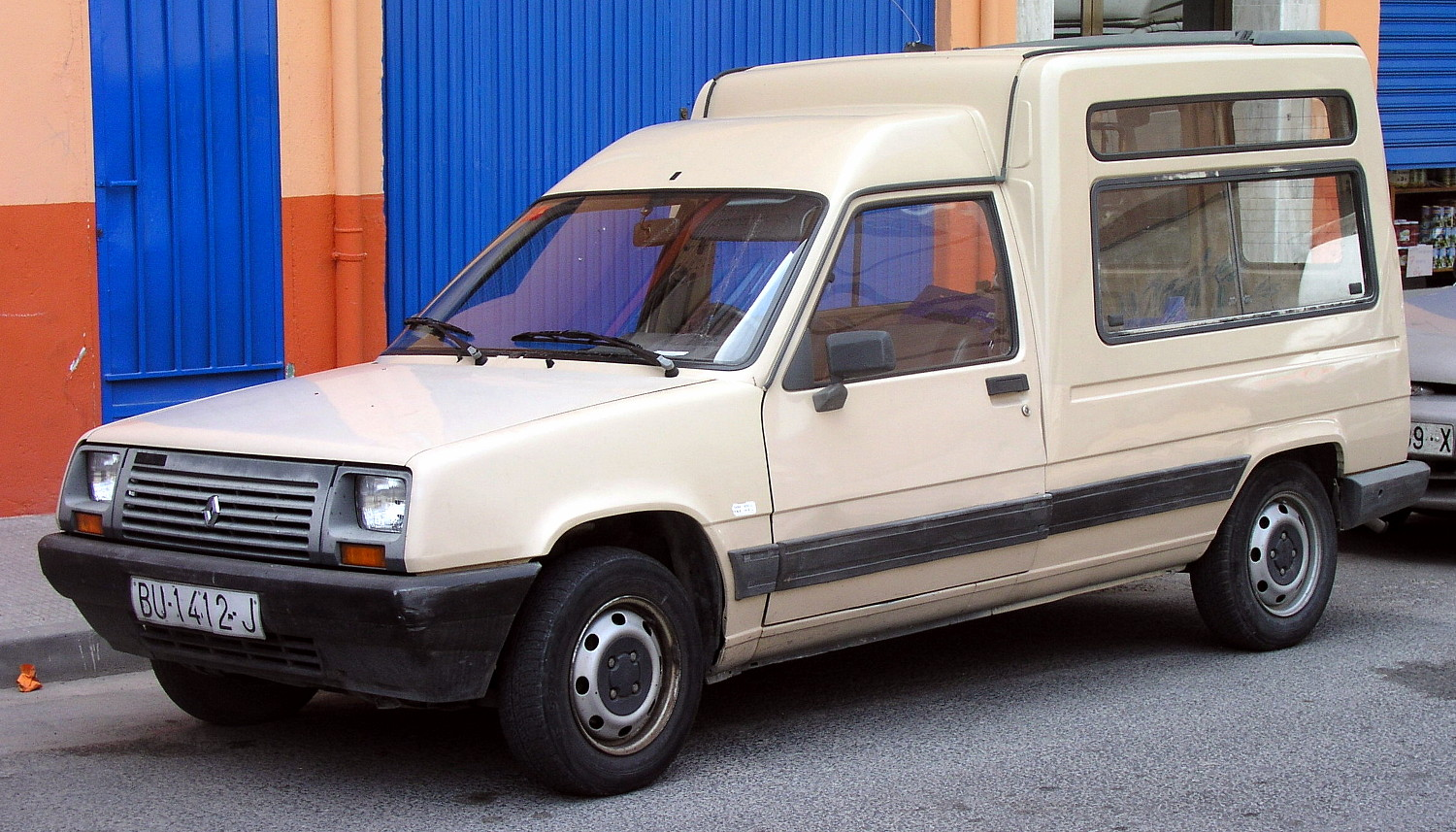

Overview
- Manufacturer: Renault
- Also called: Renault Extra; Renault Rapid
- Production: 1985–2000; 1995–2001 (South America)
- Assembly: France; Palencia, Spain; Montevideo, Uruguay; Taichung, Taiwan (Sanfu Motors)

Body and chassis
- Class: Light commercial vehicle
- Body style: Van
- Related: Renault 5

Dimensions
- Wheelbase: 2,580 mm (101.6 in)
- Length: 4,056 mm (159.7 in)
- Width: 1,566 mm (61.7 in)
- Height: 1,776 mm (69.9 in)

Chronology
- Predecessor: Renault R4 F6
- Successor: Renault Kangoo; Renault Express (2020)

The Renault Express is a panel van of the French automobile manufacturer Renault, which in July 1985 succeeded the R4 Fourgonette in the market. It was based on the second generation Renault 5.

It was commercialised in some European countries as the Renault Extra (United Kingdom and Ireland), Renault Rapid (mainly German-speaking countries) or Renault Express (in France, Spain, Austria, Switzerland, Italy, Japan, Taiwan). The vehicle stayed in production until April 2001 in Uruguay, where it was produced for South America by Nordex S.A..

== Structure ==
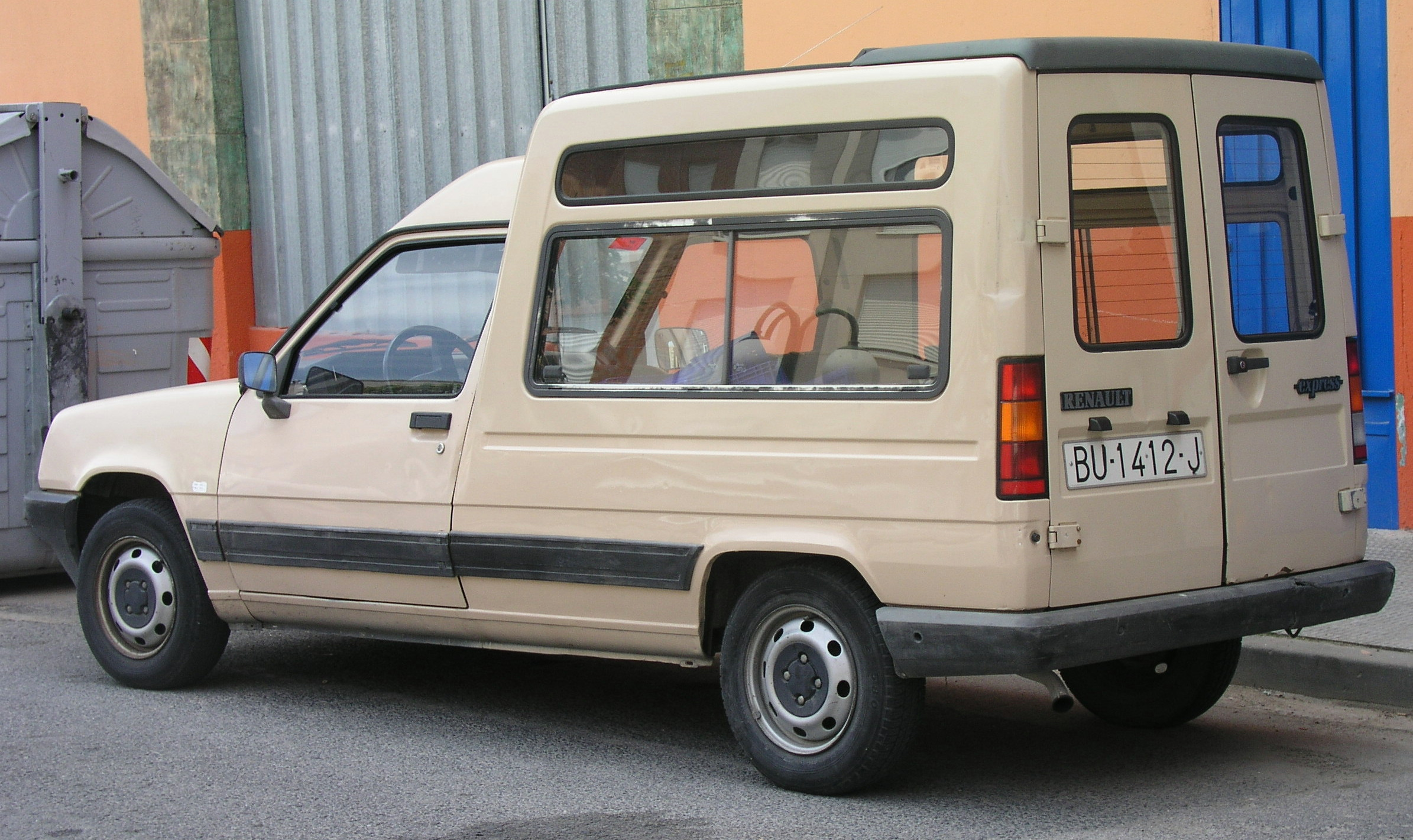
Express I Rear

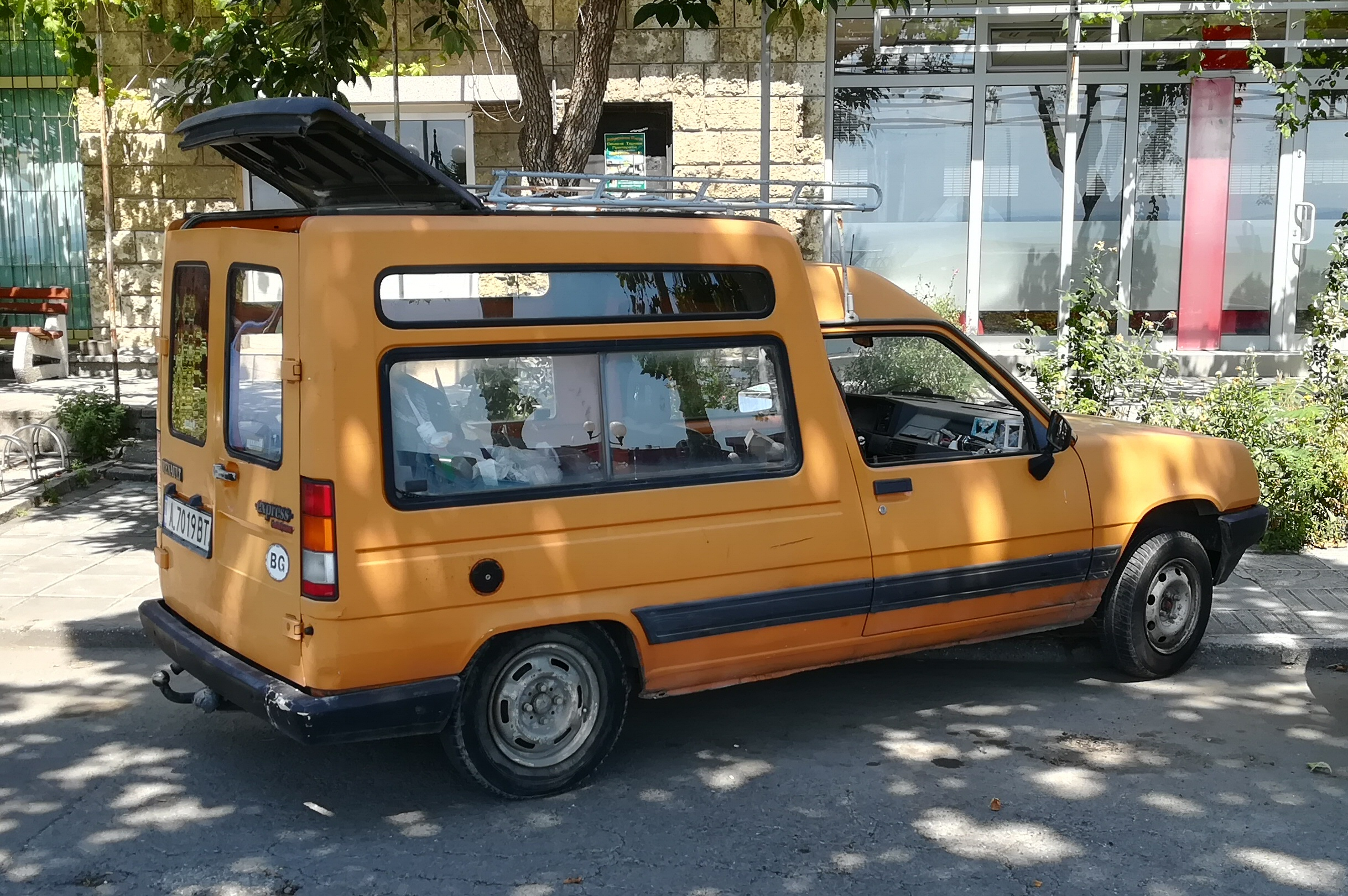
Express with open "giraffe hatch"

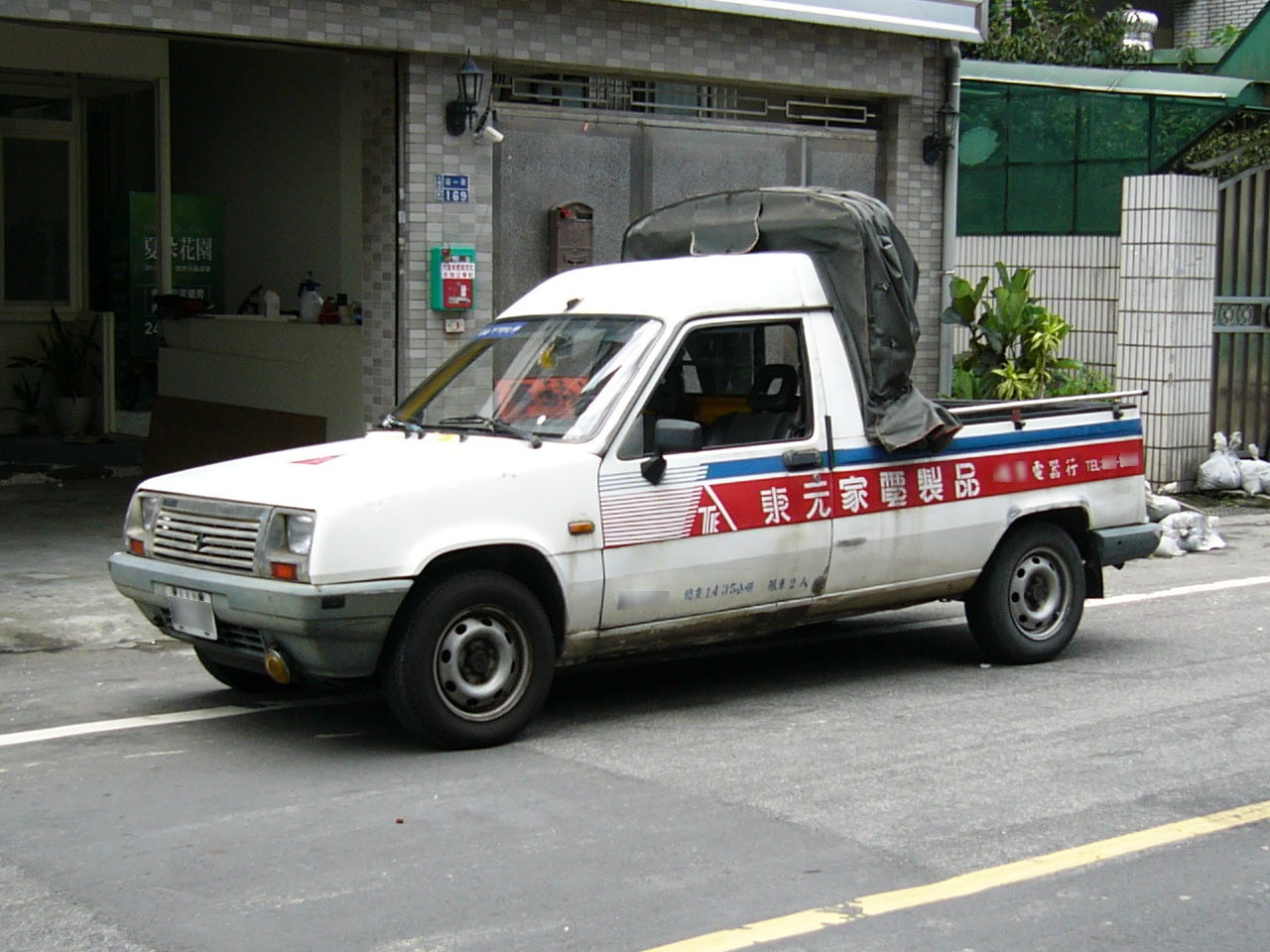
Phase I Pickup in Taiwan by Sanfu Motor

Technically, the Express was based on the second generation of the Renault 5 to which it is identical, except for a few stylistic changes, back to the A-pillar. It also uses the shorter front doors of the 5-door car.

Special features of the Express compared to the Renault 5 were the lengthened wheelbase by about 15cm, the raised roof over the driver's cab and the box structure behind the B-pillar. The vehicle came as a non or partially glazed panel van version with up to two seats or as a glazed combi with five seats. Rear access was via double doors in the rear (with or without 'giraffe hatch' above for long items) or wia a large, upward opening tailgate. The Express was also supplied as pickup, as standard factory wheelchair vans or with various special bodies (refrigerated trucks, workshop vehicles available, etcetera).

As with its predecessors, the Renault 4 F4 and F6, all wheels were individually suspended: The front by MacPherson struts and wishbones and the rear by trailing arms with torsion bars. Most similar vehicles, such as the Volkswagen Caddy or Opel Combo and others had a rear dead axle with leaf springs. Ford bought in the Renault Express rear suspension for their 1990s Fiesta Courier.

== Model series ==
Two facelifts was carried out during the vehicle's production run.

The first version (Phase 1) was built from the middle of 1985 until the summer of 1991. Renault first offered a panel van with a 1595cc diesel engine (40 kW/54 hp), while the petrol engines came from the Renault 5.

In the summer of 1991, a revision was carried out for Phase 2. The engine range changed, because now partially engines from the Renault Clio were used. Added to this was, among other things, a 1870cc diesel engine with 47 kW (64 hp). Also added was a modernised radiator grille, which was moulded in grey plastic. New headlamps were also added to this phase.

The Phase 3 of the model was from the beginning of 1994 until its replacement, the Kangoo, was launched in the end of 1997. The biggest differentiators were higher quality materials, the radiator grille in body colour and the slightly revised tail lights. A driver's airbag was added as an optional extra. Not only was the safety equipment upgraded, the comfort features, such as central locking with remote control, were updated as well. The 1598cc diesel engine was dropped; in favour of an updated 1870cc engine. Production ended in July 2000.

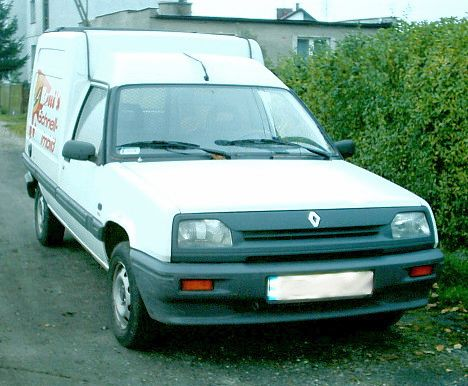
Phase II

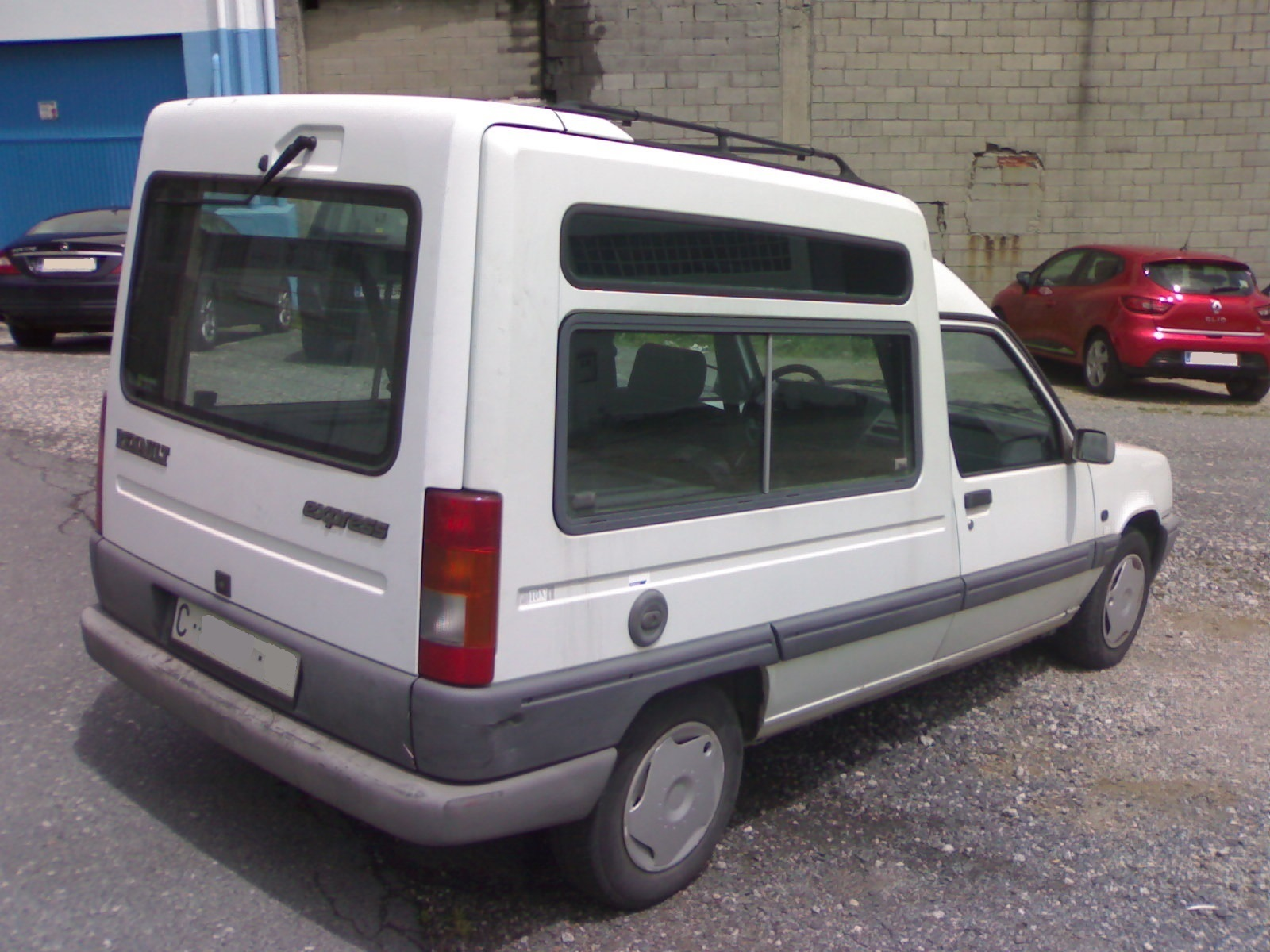
Phase II Rear

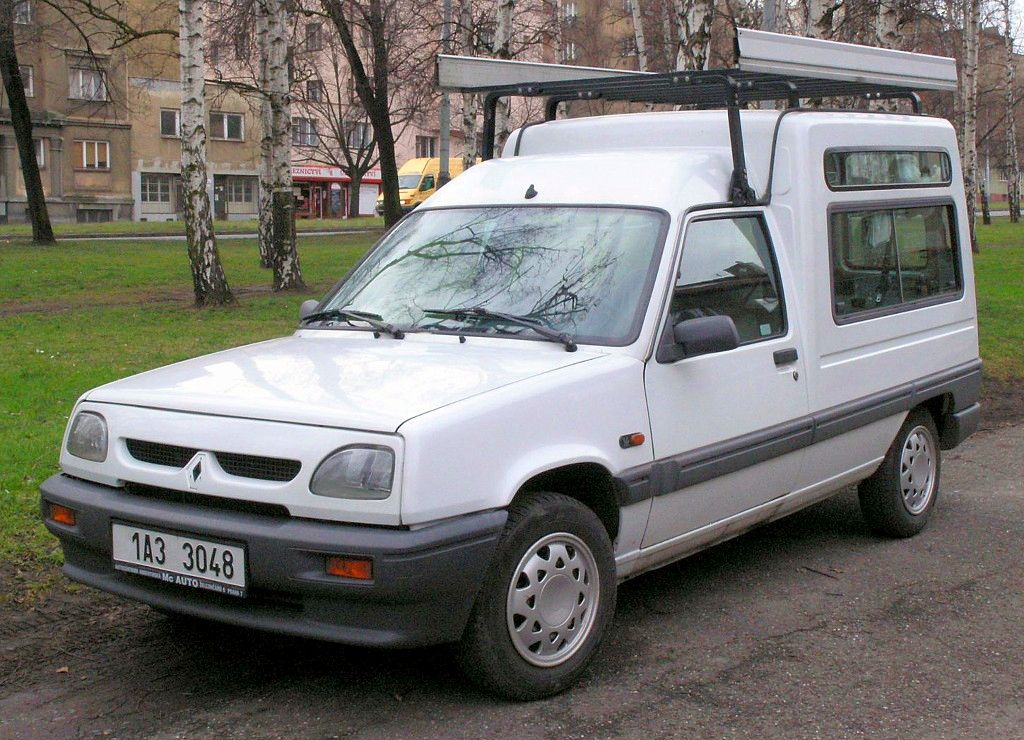
Phase III

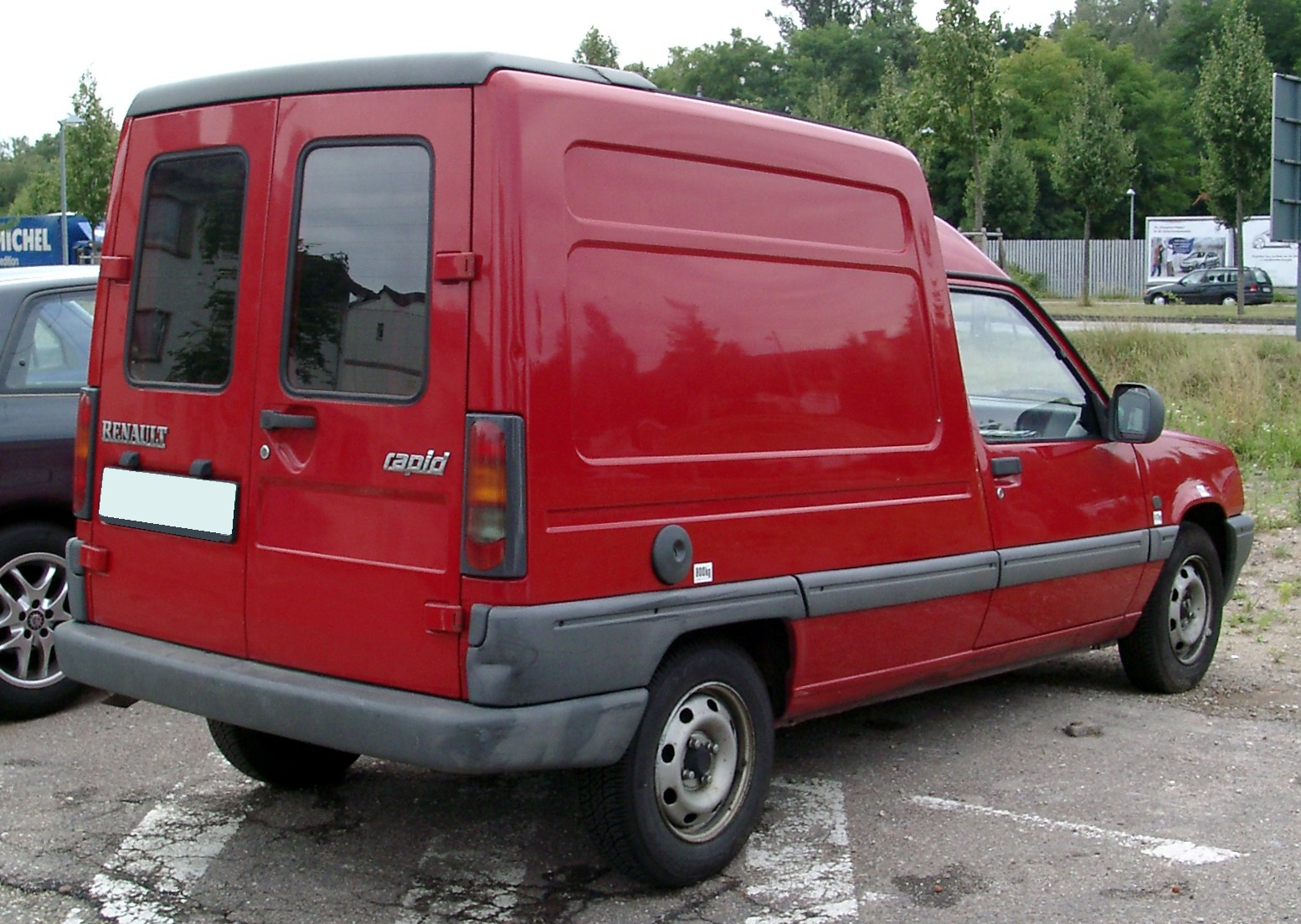
Phase III Rear

== Engine ==
Model	Type	cylinder capacity cm³	Max. power	Torque	0-100 km/h (0-62 mph) sec.	Year
Petrol
1.0	C1C	956	31 kW (42 hp) at 4400 rpm	63 N⋅m (46 lbf⋅ft) at 2500 rpm		1986−1991
1.1	C1E	1108	33 kW (44 hp) at 4400 rpm	85 N⋅m (63 lbf⋅ft) at 2000 rpm	20,1	1986−1991
1.2	E5F	1171	40 kW (54 hp) at 6000 rpm	84 N⋅m (62 lbf⋅ft) at 3500 rpm	16,5	1991−1997
1.2	C3G	1239	40 kW (54 hp) at 5300 rpm	90 N⋅m (66 lbf⋅ft) at 4800 rpm	16,5	1995−1997
1.4	C2J	1397	50 kW (67 hp) at 5250 rpm	104 N⋅m (77 lbf⋅ft) at 3500 rpm	14,5	1986−1992
1.4	C3J	1390	44 kW (59 hp) at 5250 rpm	101 N⋅m (74 lbf⋅ft) at 2750 rpm		1986−1992
1.4	E7J	1390	55 kW (74 hp) at 5600 rpm	109 N⋅m (80 lbf⋅ft) at 4000 rpm		1991−1997
1.5	C3L	1565	43 kW (58 hp) at 5000 rpm	100 N⋅m (74 lbf⋅ft) at 3500 rpm	14,5	1996−2000
Diesel
1.6 D	F8M	1596	40 kW (54 hp) at 4800 rpm	102 N⋅m (75 lbf⋅ft) at 2250 rpm	17,8	1986−1994
1.9 D	F8Q	1870	40 kW (54 hp) at 3900 rpm	123 N⋅m (91 lbf⋅ft) at 2250 rpm	18,5	1995−1997
1.9 D	F8Q	1870	47 kW (63 hp) at 4500 rpm	118 N⋅m (87 lbf⋅ft) at 2250 rpm	16,5	1991−1997
