= Dacia Jogger =

Multi-activity vehicle produced by Dacia

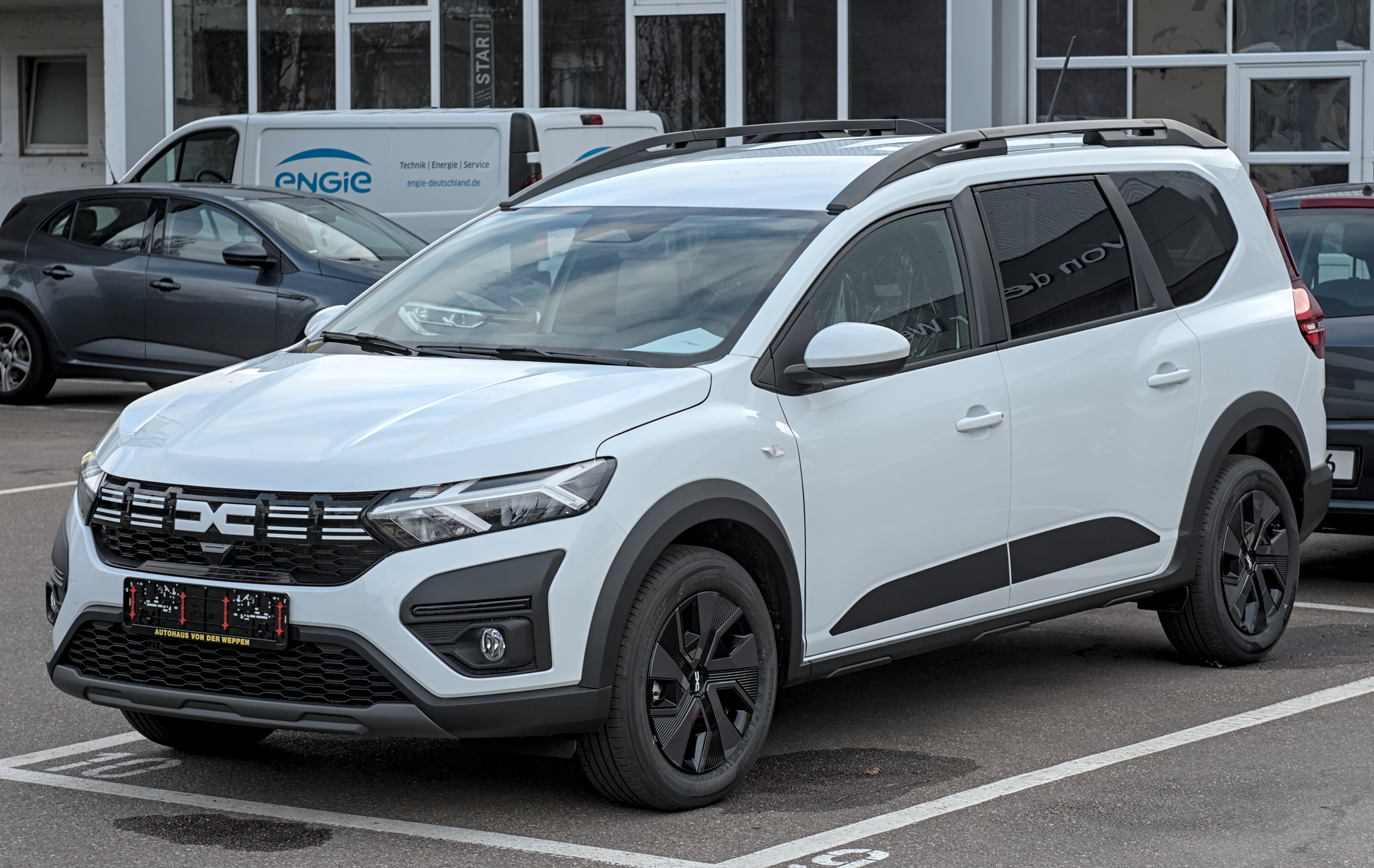
- 2023 Dacia Jogger (facelift)

Overview
- Manufacturer: Dacia (Renault)
- Production: 2021–present
- Assembly: Romania: Mioveni (2021–2024); Morocco: Tangier (July 2024–present)
- Designer: Alain Muschi

Body and chassis
- Class: Compact MPV
- Body style: 5-door wagon
- Layout: Front-engine, front-wheel-drive
- Platform: Renault–Nissan CMF-B LS
- Related: Dacia Logan III; Dacia Sandero III

Powertrain
- Engine: Petrol: 1.0 L H4Dt TCe 100 I3 Multi-valve turbo; 1.0 L H5Dt TCe 110 I3 Multi-valve turbo; Petrol LPG: 1.0 L H4Dt ECO-G 100 I3 turbo (2021–2025); 1.2 L HR12 ECO-G 120 I3 turbo (2026–present); Petrol hybrid: 1.6 L H4M I4 (Hybrid 140; 2023–2025); 1.8 L Horse HR18 HEV I4 (Hybrid 155; 2026–present); Diesel: 1.5 L K9K dCi 100 I4 turbo (North Africa)
- Transmission: 6-speed manual; Multi-mode 4+2-speed automatic (Hybrid 140)
- Battery: 1.2 kWh lithium-ion (Hybrid 140; 2023–2025) 1.4 kWh lithium-ion (Hybrid 155; 2026–present)

Dimensions
- Wheelbase: 2,897 mm (114.1 in)
- Length: 4,547 mm (179.0 in)
- Width: 1,784 mm (70.2 in)
- Height: 1,632 mm (64.3 in)
- Curb weight: 1,176–1,385 kg (2,593–3,053 lb)

Chronology
- Predecessor: Dacia Logan MCV; Dacia Lodgy; Dacia Dokker (passenger version)

The Dacia Jogger is a car produced and marketed jointly by the French manufacturer Renault and its Romanian subsidiary Dacia. Its nameplate was revealed in August 2021 as a successor to the Logan MCV, Lodgy and Dokker in the compact MPV market segment. Based on the third-generation Logan, it is offered in both five- and seven-seat variants.

The Dacia Jogger was unveiled on 3 September 2021, before its public presentation on 6 September 2021, at the Munich Motor Show.

== Overview ==
Despite being intended to compete in the MPV market, the Jogger is a long-wheelbase wagon version of the third generation Sandero and Logan, similar to the former Logan MCV.

Despite the fact that the Jogger has crossover design elements, it is not classified as an SUV.

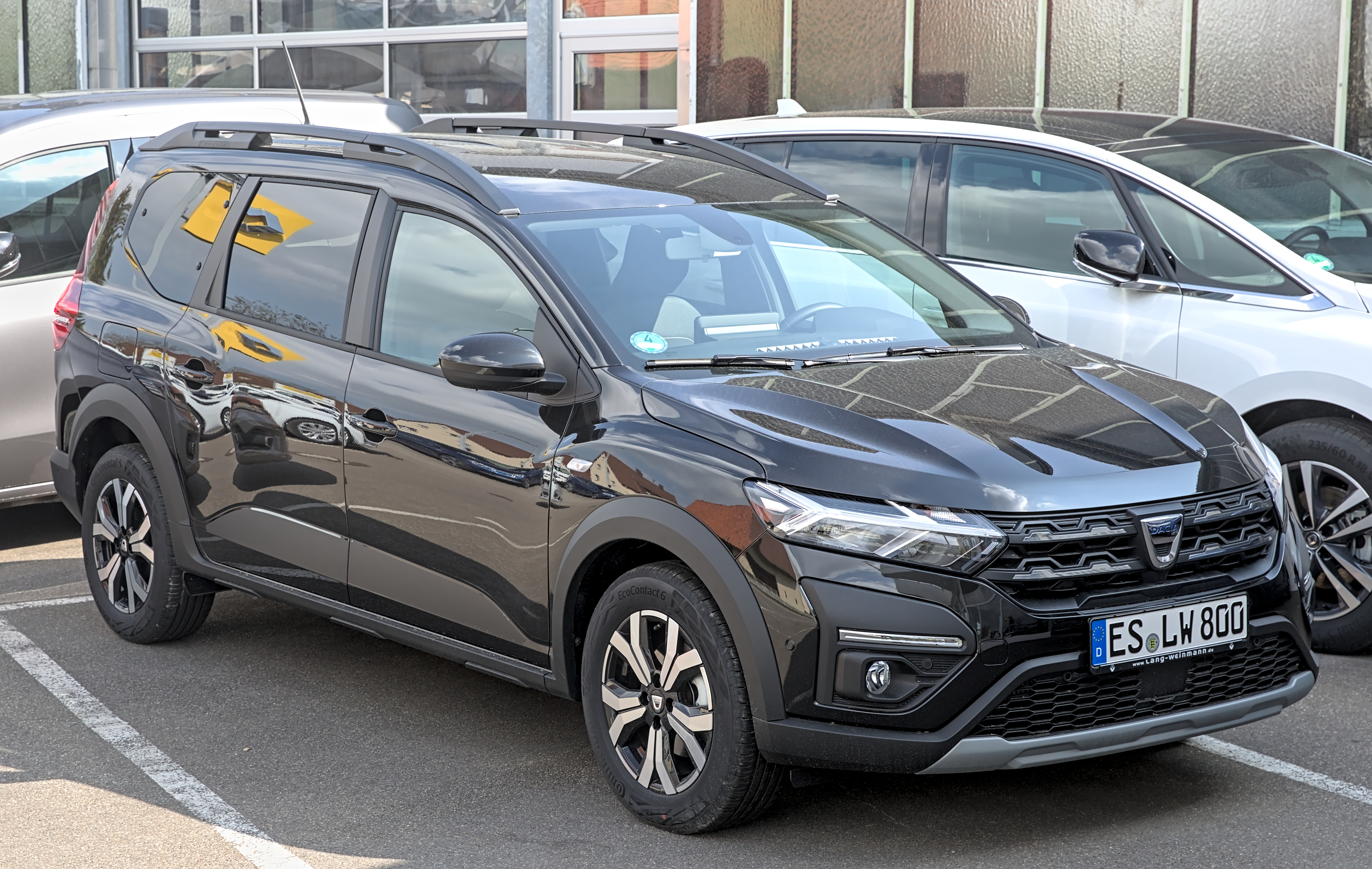
Dacia Jogger (pre-facelift)

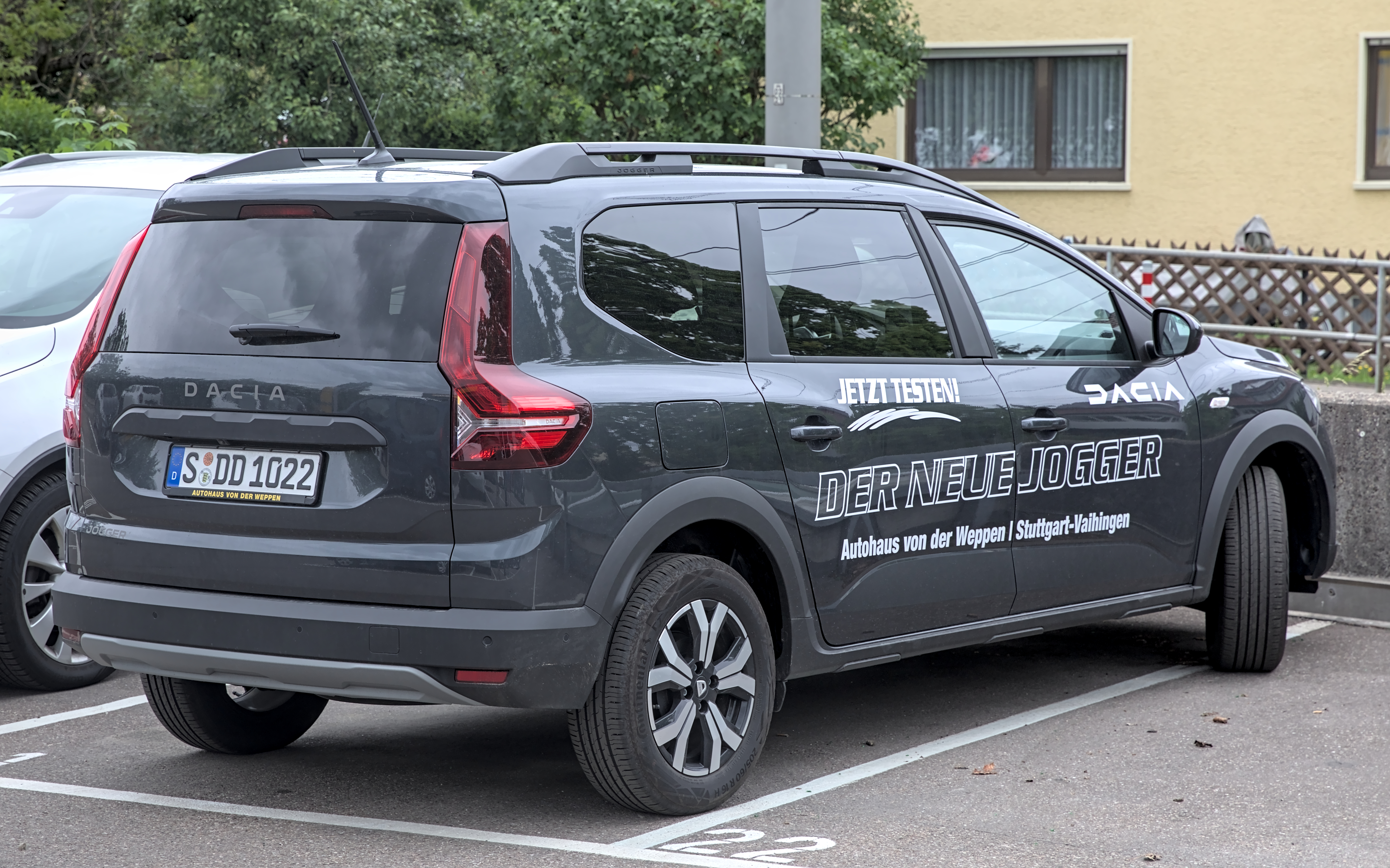
Rear view

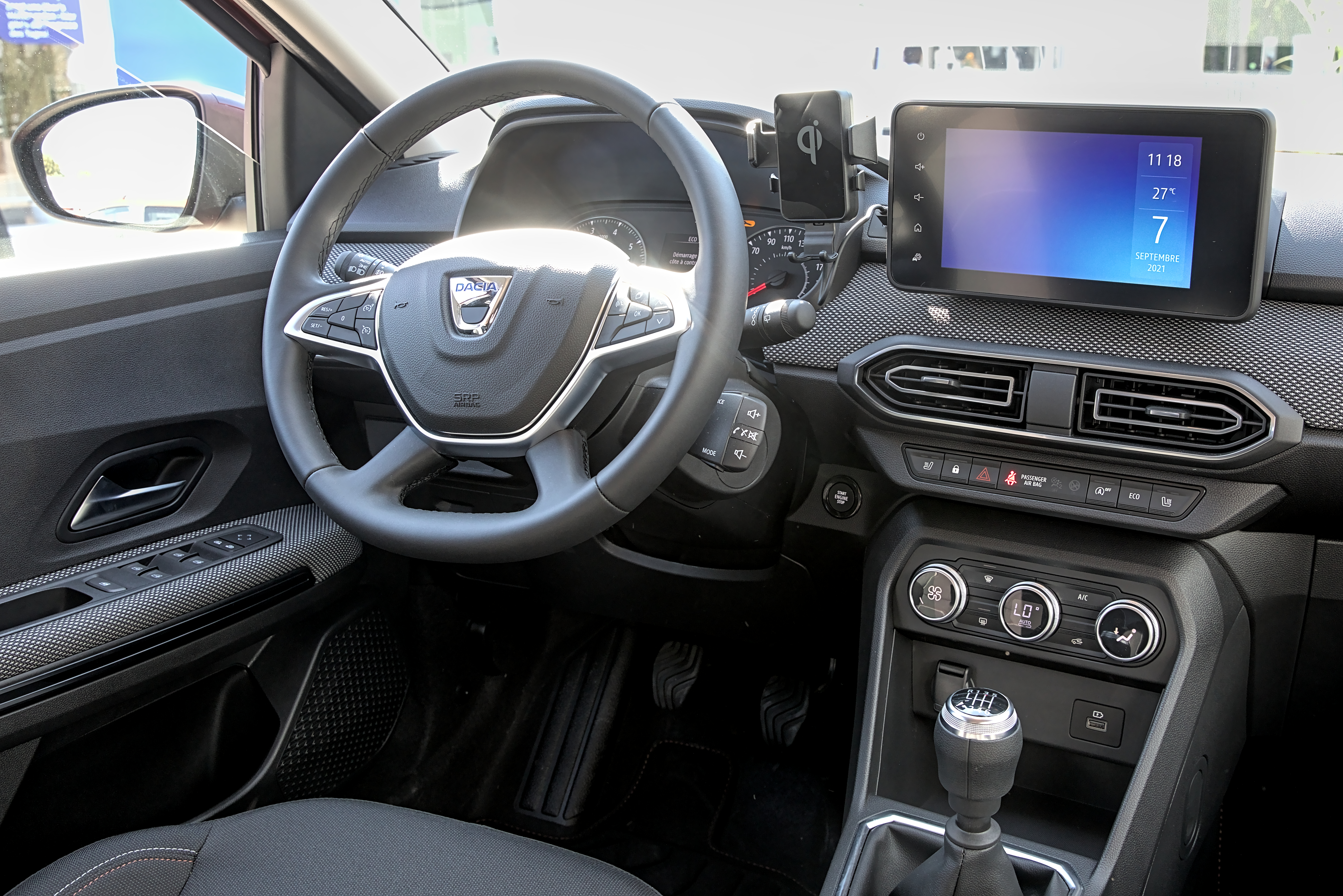
Interior

=== 2022 refresh ===
In June 2022, less than a year after its commercial release, the Jogger received a slight update revealing the brand's new logo alongside the entire Dacia range. The grille was slightly modified to accommodate the new logo. The trim levels have been revised and a new Lichen Kaki colour is launched.

The Jogger is also available with a hybrid powertrain, dubbed the Hybrid 140, which refers to the 140 hp (104 kW) output, the same as the full-hybrid 1.6 TCe 140 12V petrol engine found in the Renault Clio, Captur and Arkana. The Jogger Hybrid 140 is equipped with a multi-mode automatic electric gearbox, which four-speed attached to the combustion engine and a two-speed gearbox attached to the electric motor.

The powertrain was revealed at the 2022 Paris Motor Show, with orders open from January 2023 and first deliveries arriving in March of that year.

In March 2023, Dacia unveiled the optional Sleep Pack for the Jogger, which turns it into a camper. The factory kit was announced at the Brussels Motor Show alongside the debut of the Extreme flagship trim for the Spring, Sandero Stepway, Jogger and Duster.

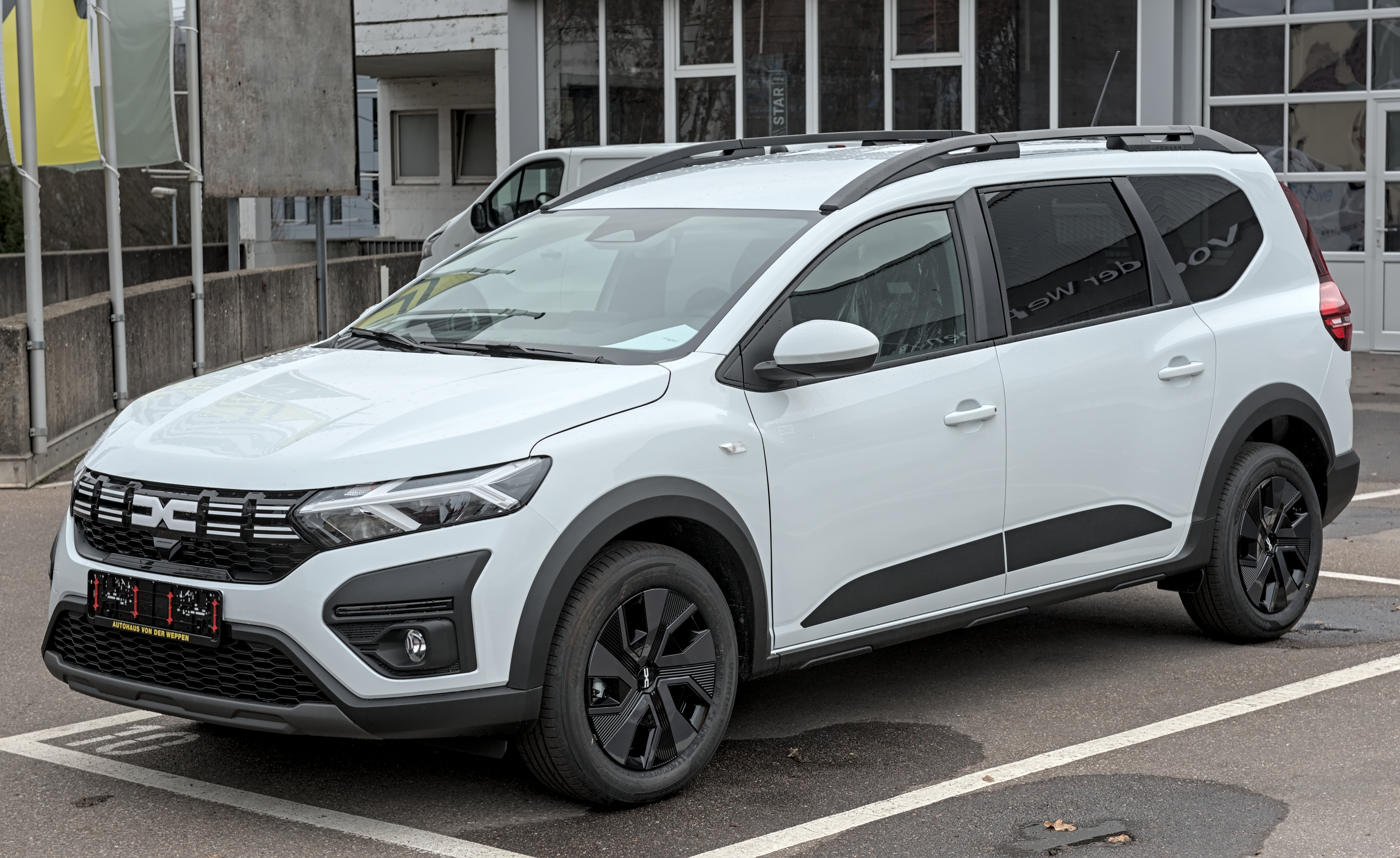
2022 refresh

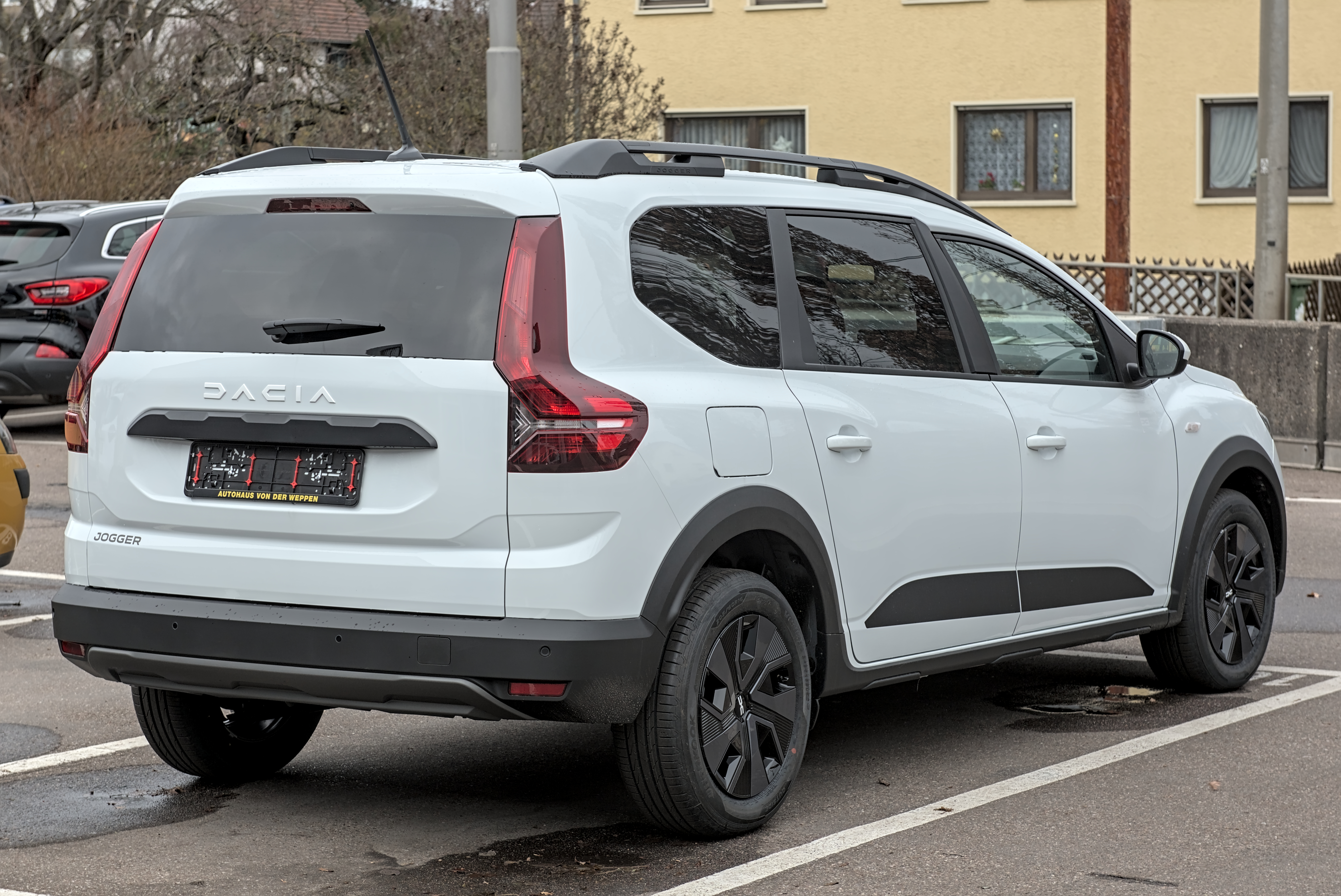
Rear view (2022 refresh)

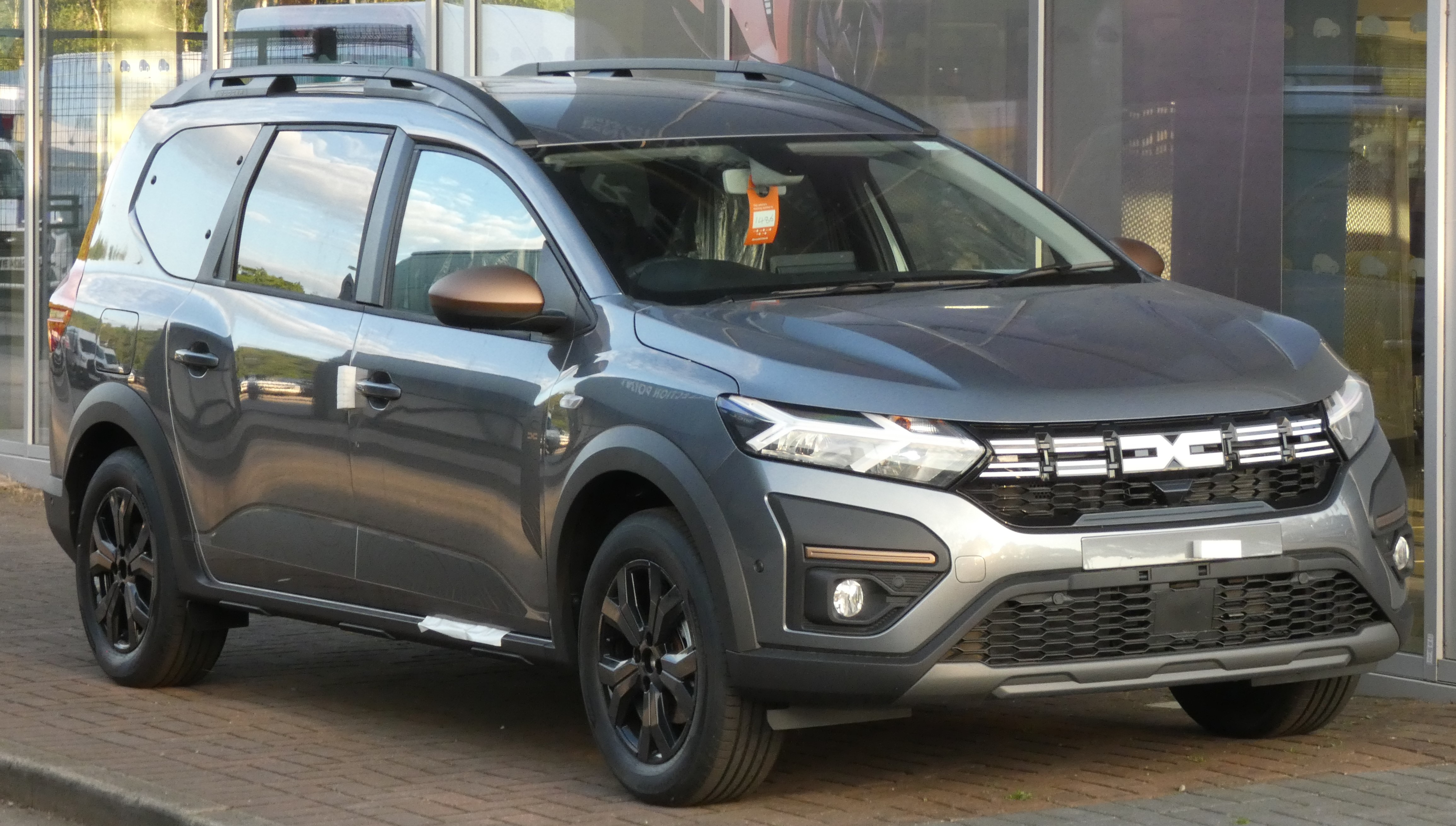
2024 Jogger Extreme Hybrid

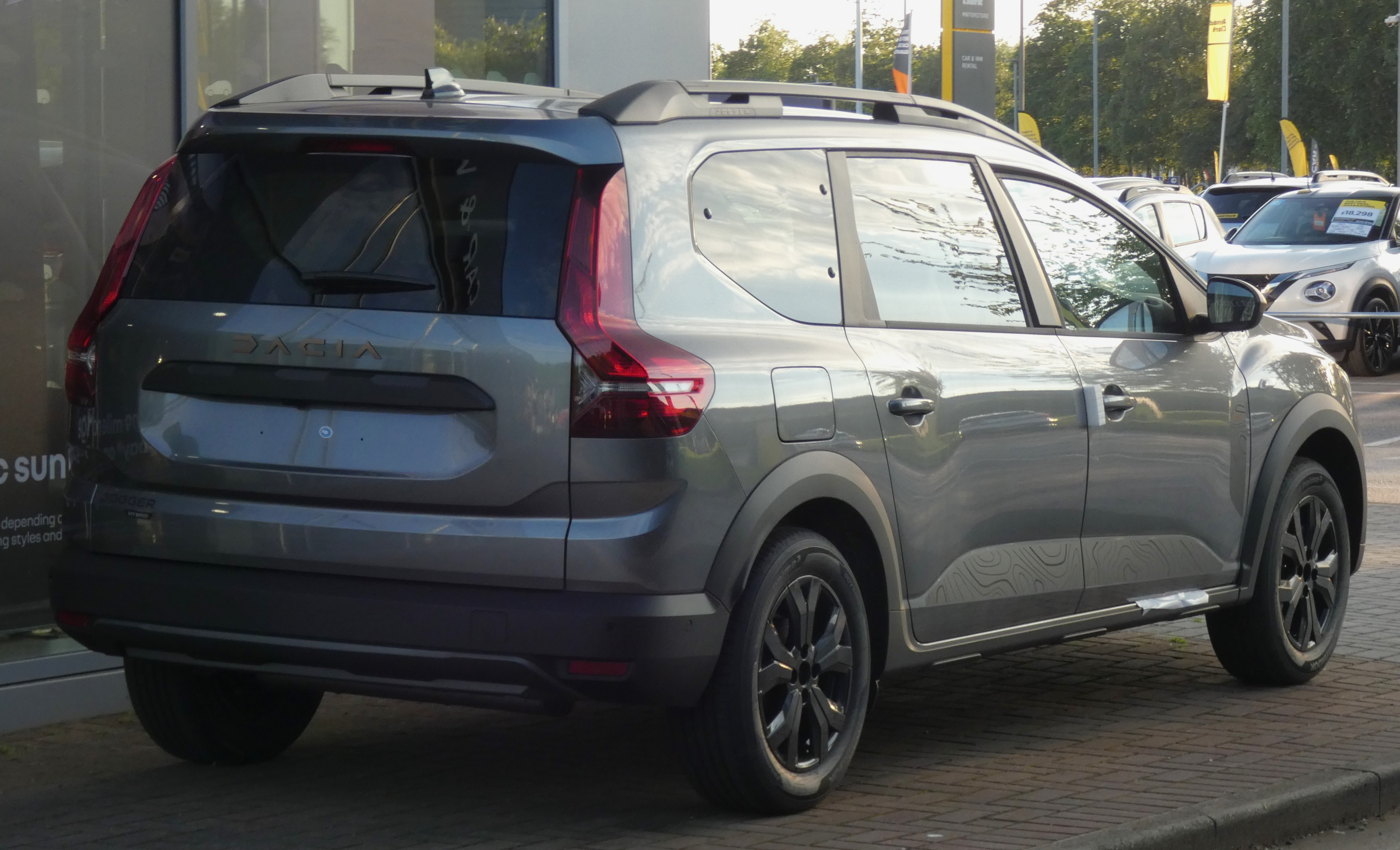
2024 Jogger Extreme Hybrid

=== 2025 refresh ===
On 6 October 2025, the Jogger alongside the Sandero, Sandero Stepway and Logan, received a heavy facelift featuring a redesigned front fascia, new headlights, new fog lights and new alloys, while the rear remains the same as the previous facelift but with new taillights. Additionally, advanced safety features such as lane departure warning systems became standard with the 2025 model to meet regulatory requirements.

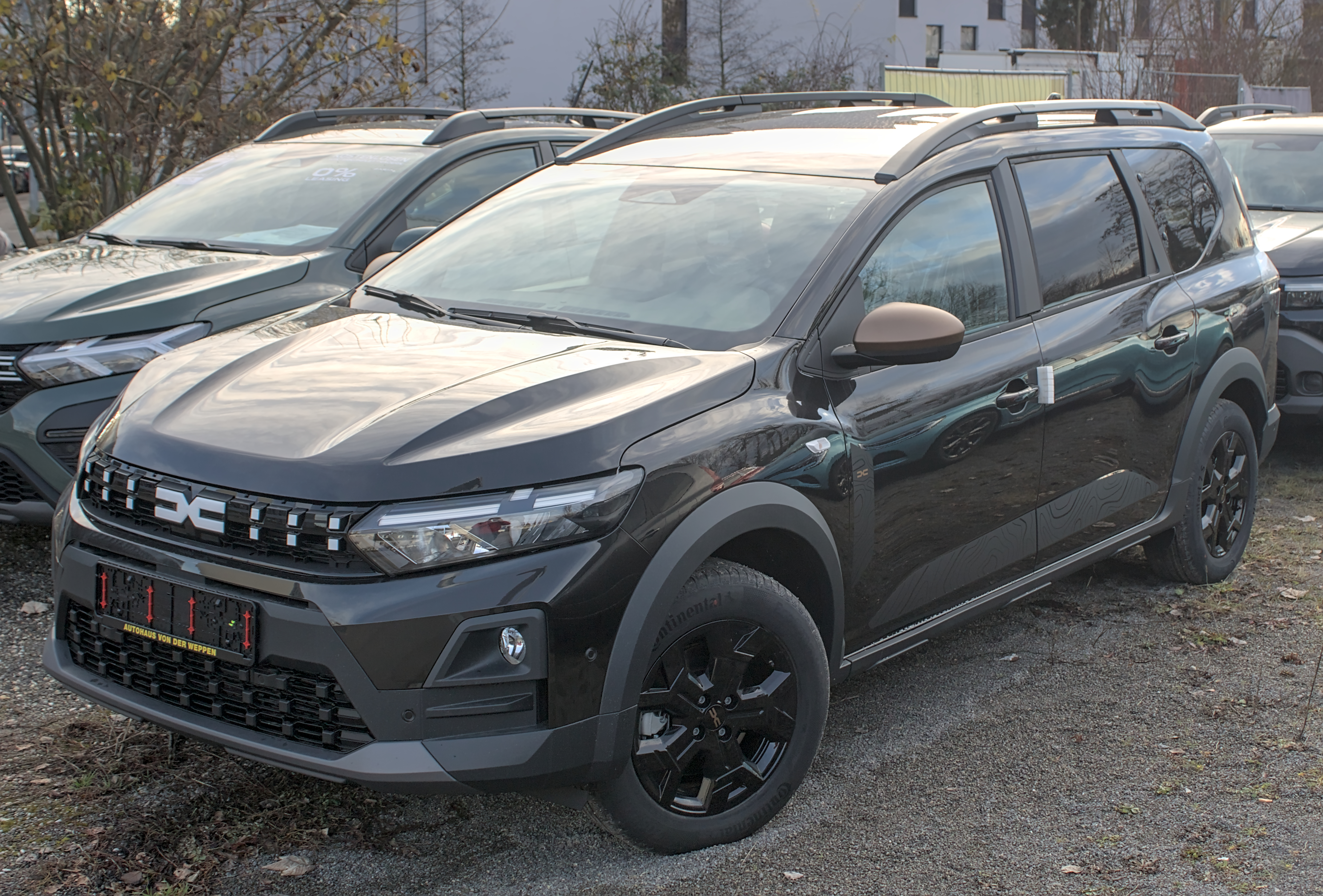
Front view (2025 refresh)

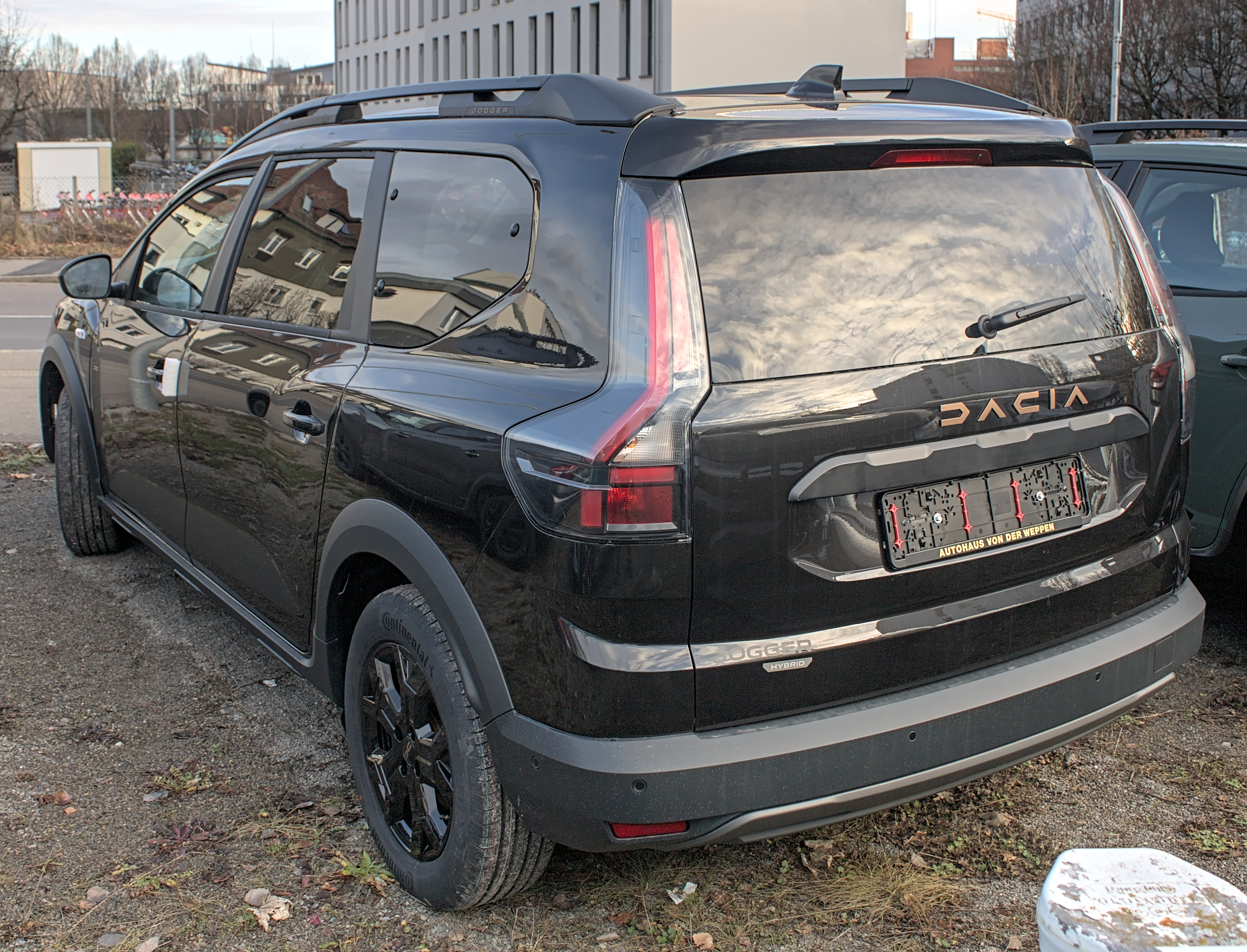
Rear view (2025 refresh)

=== 2026 refresh ===
The 2026 model year introduced the Hybrid 155 variant, pairing a more powerful battery (1.4 kWh up from 1.2 kWh) and new combustion engine (4-cylinder, 1.8L HR18 replacing the 3-cylinder, 1.6L H4M), resulting in increased aggregate horsepower of 155 from 140.

== Safety ==
=== Euro NCAP ===
The Jogger in its standard European market configuration received 1 star from Euro NCAP in 2021 with its results borrowed from the Sandero Stepway.
