= Dacia Dokker =

Panel van and leisure activity vehicle (LAV)

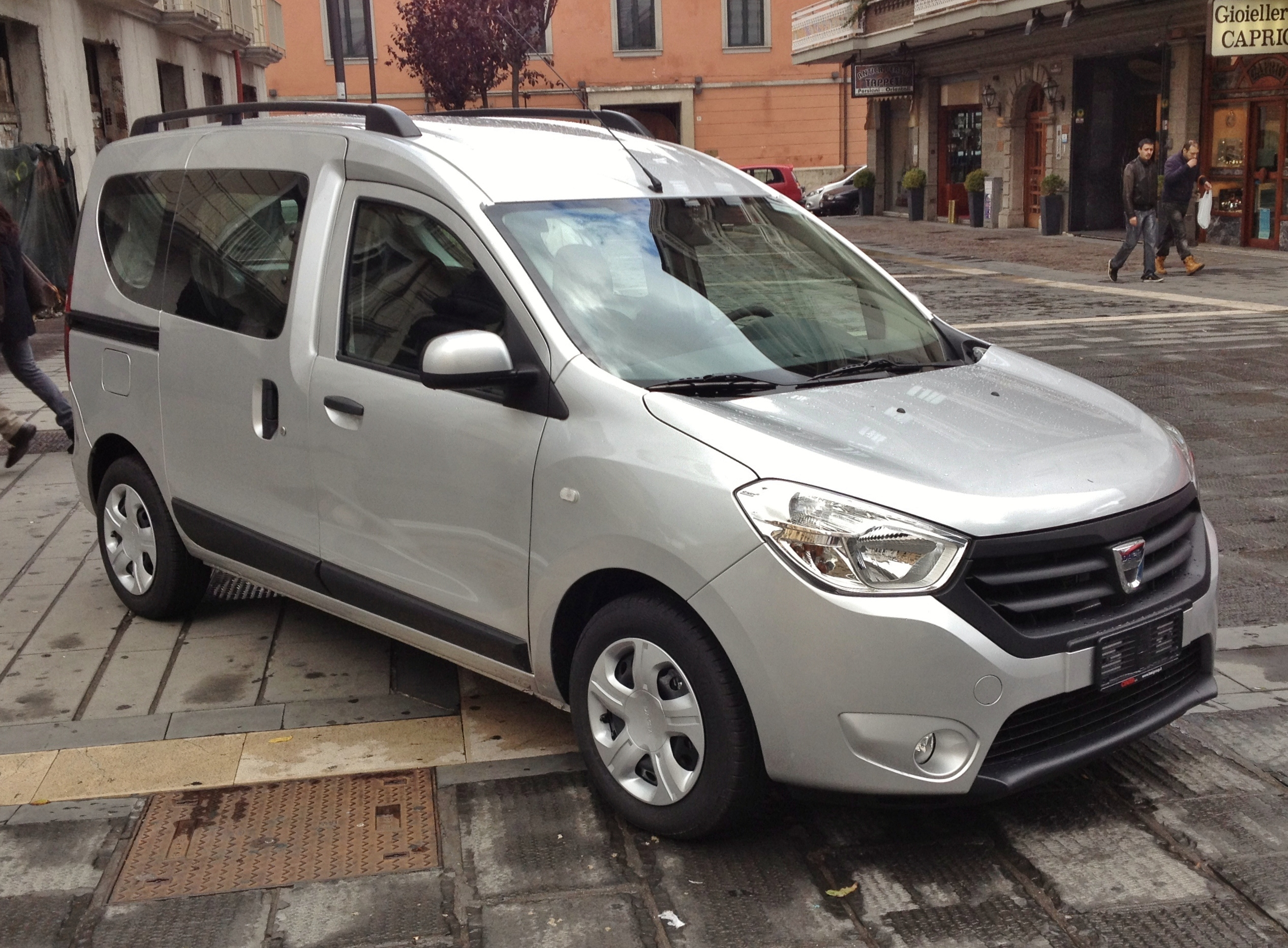
- Dacia Dokker (2012; pre-facelift)

Overview
- Manufacturer: Dacia (Renault)
- Model code: F67
- Also called: Renault Dokker (CIS, Ukraine & Middle East); Renault Kangoo (Latin America & Algeria)
- Production: 2012–2021 (Morocco); 2018–present (Argentina)
- Assembly: Morocco: Tangier (Renault Med); Argentina: Córdoba (Renault Argentina)

Body and chassis
- Class: Leisure activity vehicle Panel van (Van); Subcompact coupé utility (Pick-Up)
- Body style: 4/5-door LAV; 4-door panel van 2-door pick-up
- Layout: Front-engine, front-wheel-drive
- Platform: Dacia M0 platform
- Related: Dacia Lodgy; Renault Express (2020)

Powertrain
- Engine: Petrol: 1.2 L H5Ft turbo I4; 1.3 L H5Ht turbo I4; 1.6 L K7M I4; 1.6 L H4M I4; Diesel: 1.5 L K9K dCi I4
- Transmission: 5-speed manual 6-speed manual (later models)

Dimensions
- Wheelbase: 2,810 mm (110.6 in)
- Length: 4,363 mm (171.8 in)
- Width: 1,751 mm (68.9 in)
- Height: 1,814 mm (71.4 in)
- Curb weight: 1,165–1,405 kg (2,568–3,097 lb)

Chronology
- Predecessor: Dacia Logan I (MCV/Van/Pick-Up)
- Successor: Renault Express; Dacia Jogger (passenger version)

The Dacia Dokker is a panel van and leisure activity vehicle (LAV) built at the Renault factory in Tangier, Morocco. It was officially launched at the 2012 Casablanca Auto Show, and initially went on sale in Morocco in June 2012. It has been available in Romania since September 2012, and is marketed in Europe, North Africa, Turkey, Israel and French overseas territories.

It is manufactured in passenger and panel van variants, as well as a crossover version, the Dokker Stepway, introduced at the 2012 Istanbul Motor Show, featuring body elements similar to the Sandero Stepway. It is marketed in the CIS countries and in the Middle East under the name Renault Dokker and Renault Kangoo in Latin America and Algeria, but not in other parts of the world, as it would cannibalize the sales of its French sourced brother, the Renault Kangoo. In 2018, Dacia Italia together with Focaccia Group created a pick-up variant for the Italian market.

In 2020, the Dokker built in Morocco has been facelifted, and renamed Renault Express as a replacement for the Dacia Dokker and Renault Dokker.

== Markets ==
=== Argentina ===
A revised version is produced in Argentina as the Renault Kangoo, being launched commercially in 2018 as a first generation Renault Kangoo replacement, and the passenger version in May of the same year. It also arrived in the Mexican market in 2019. It is also exported to other Latin America markets such as Uruguay, Paraguay and Colombia. In July 2023, exports to Algeria began.

As of 2015, the Kangoo contains about 40% Argentine parts.

== Features ==
The name Dokker is a pun on the word dock worker and, according to Dacia, expresses the large transport capacity of the model and its modular interior and robustness.

The passenger version offers five seats and has a luggage capacity of 800 litres (28 cu ft), with a maximum loading length of 1.16 m (3.8 ft). It has one sliding side door, and can be optionally ordered with sliding doors on both sides. The rear bench seat can be split asymmetrically, and it can also be tipped forward against the front seats, which creates a carrying capacity of 3,000 litres (110 cu ft) and a loading length of 1.57 m (5.2 ft).

The panel van version has a luggage capacity of 3,300 litres (120 cu ft) and a maximum loading length of 1.90 m (6.2 ft). The front passenger seat is foldable, which can also be tipped forward against the glove box to have a maximum loading length of up to 2.42 m (7.9 ft). If the front seat is completely removed, it has a carrying capacity of 3,900 litres (140 cu ft) and a maximum loading length of up to 3.11 m (10.2 ft).

The payload capacity is 750 kg (1,653 lb). Also, a second sliding side door is optional and has asymmetrical rear doors that can open at 90 or 180 degrees.

The car can also be ordered with a Media Nav system, which comes with navigation and audio functions, hands-free Bluetooth connectivity and USB and jack sockets. Other optional equipment offered are cruise control and rear parking sensors.

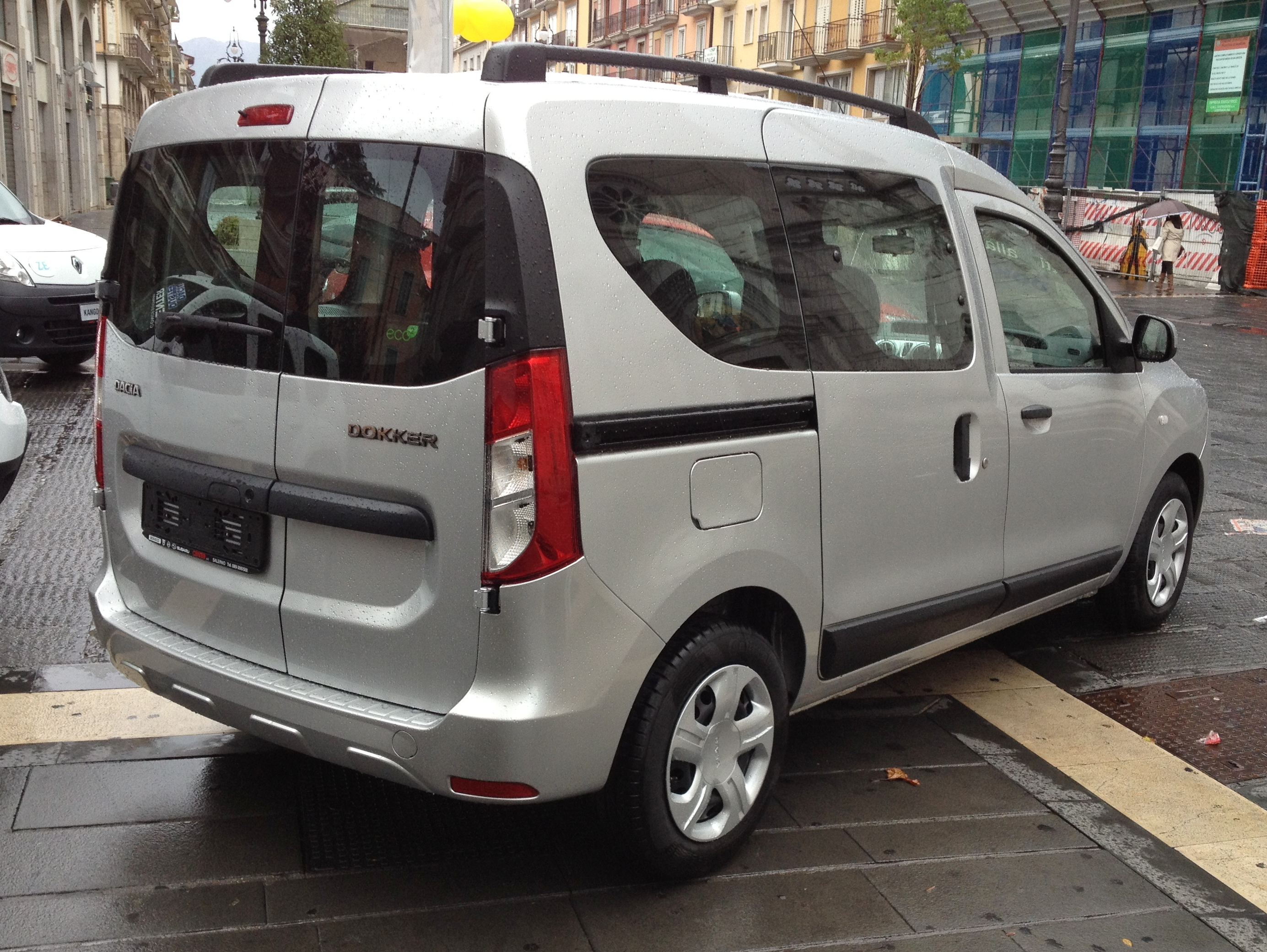
Dacia Dokker (2012; pre-facelift)

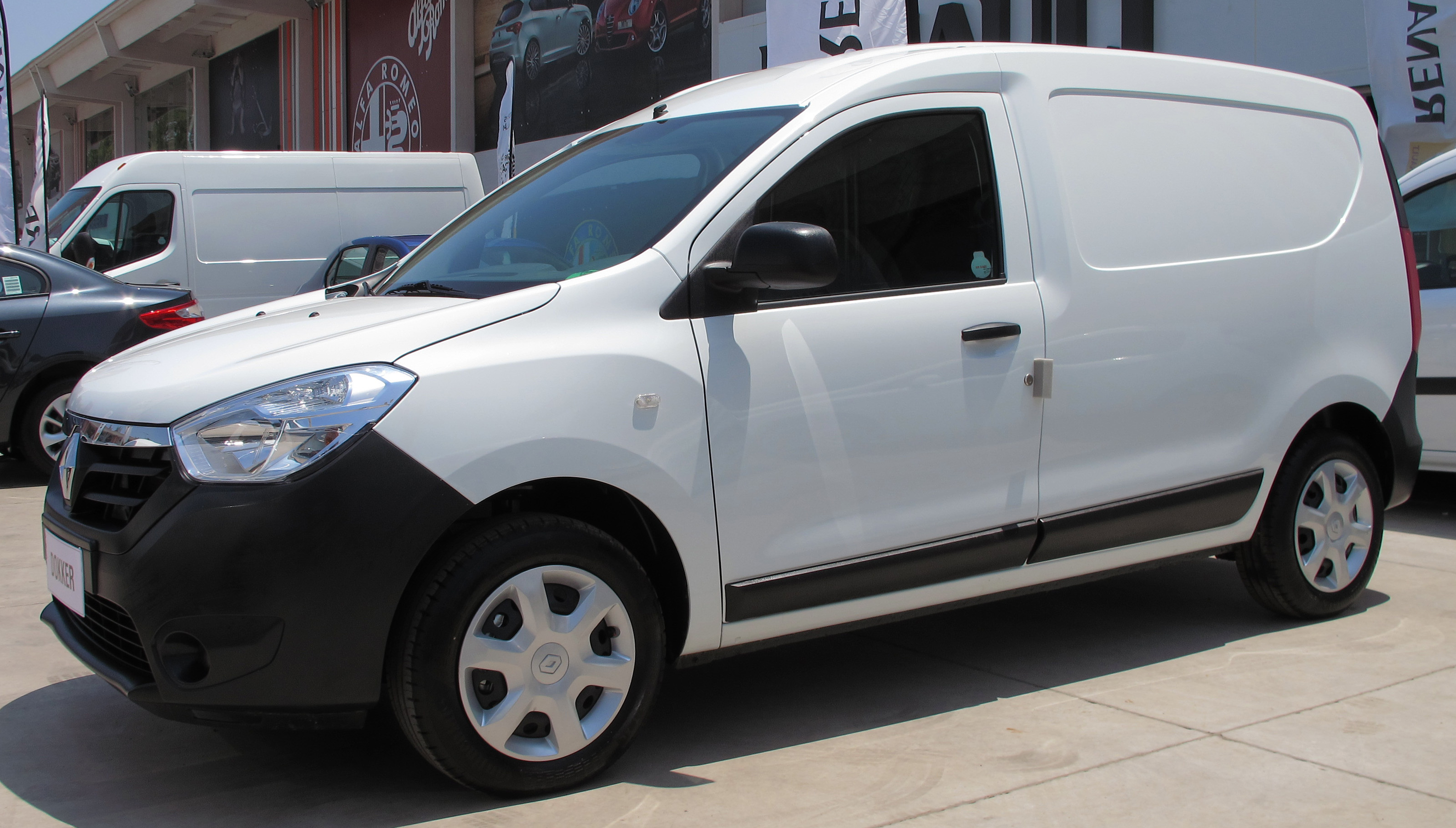
Renault Dokker Van (2015; pre-facelift)

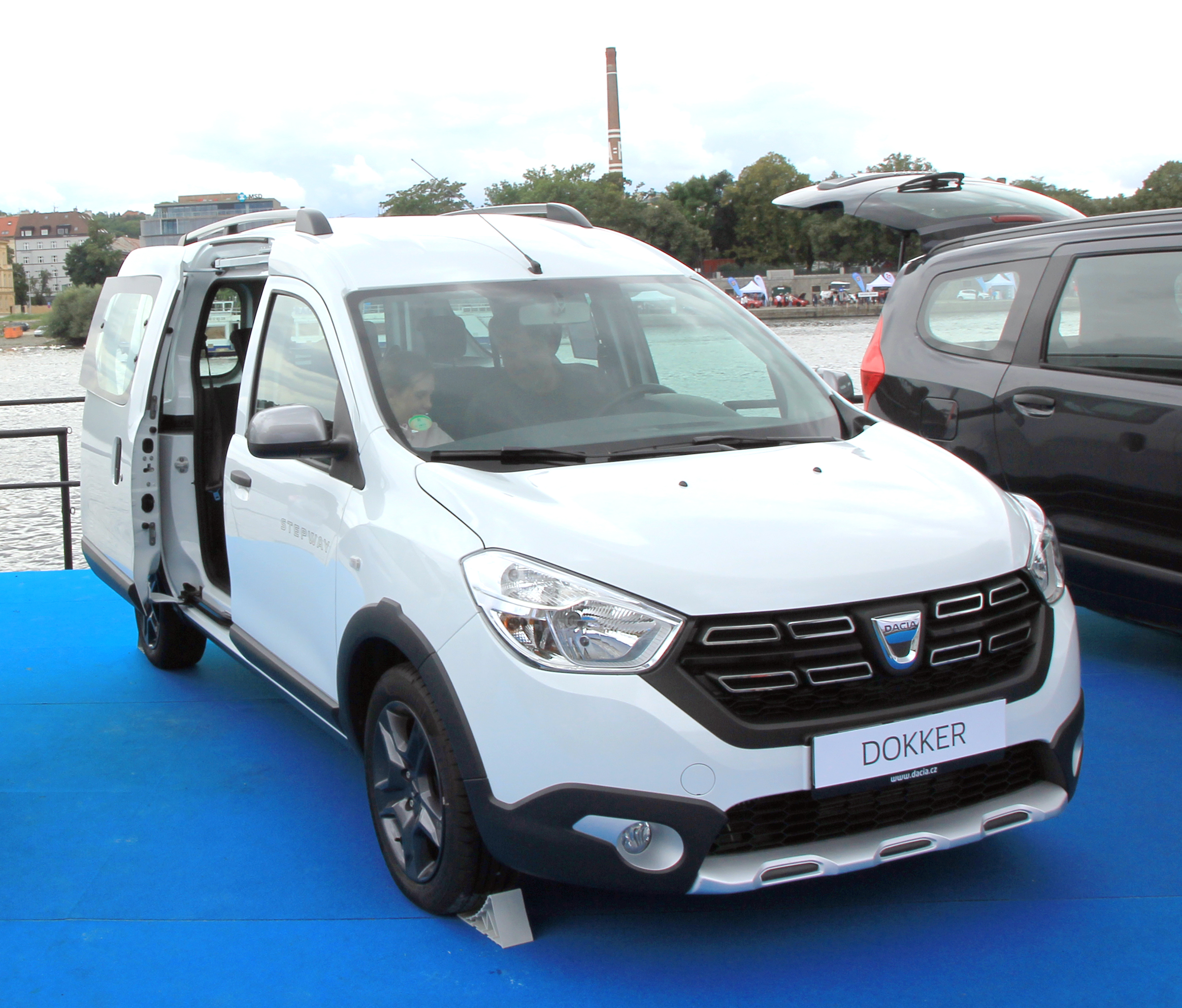
Dacia Dokker Stepway (2017; facelift)

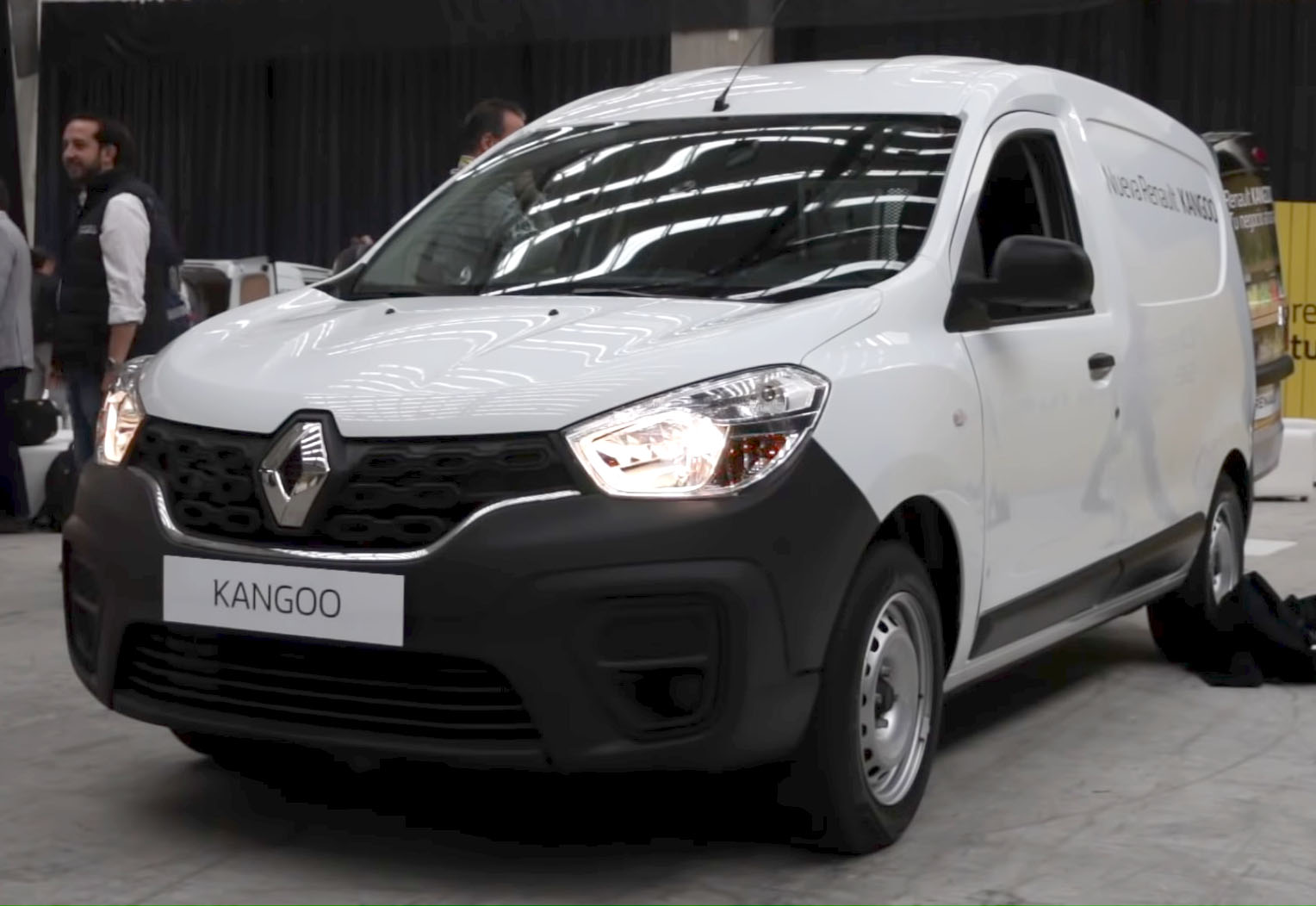
2018 Renault Kangoo Express (Colombia)

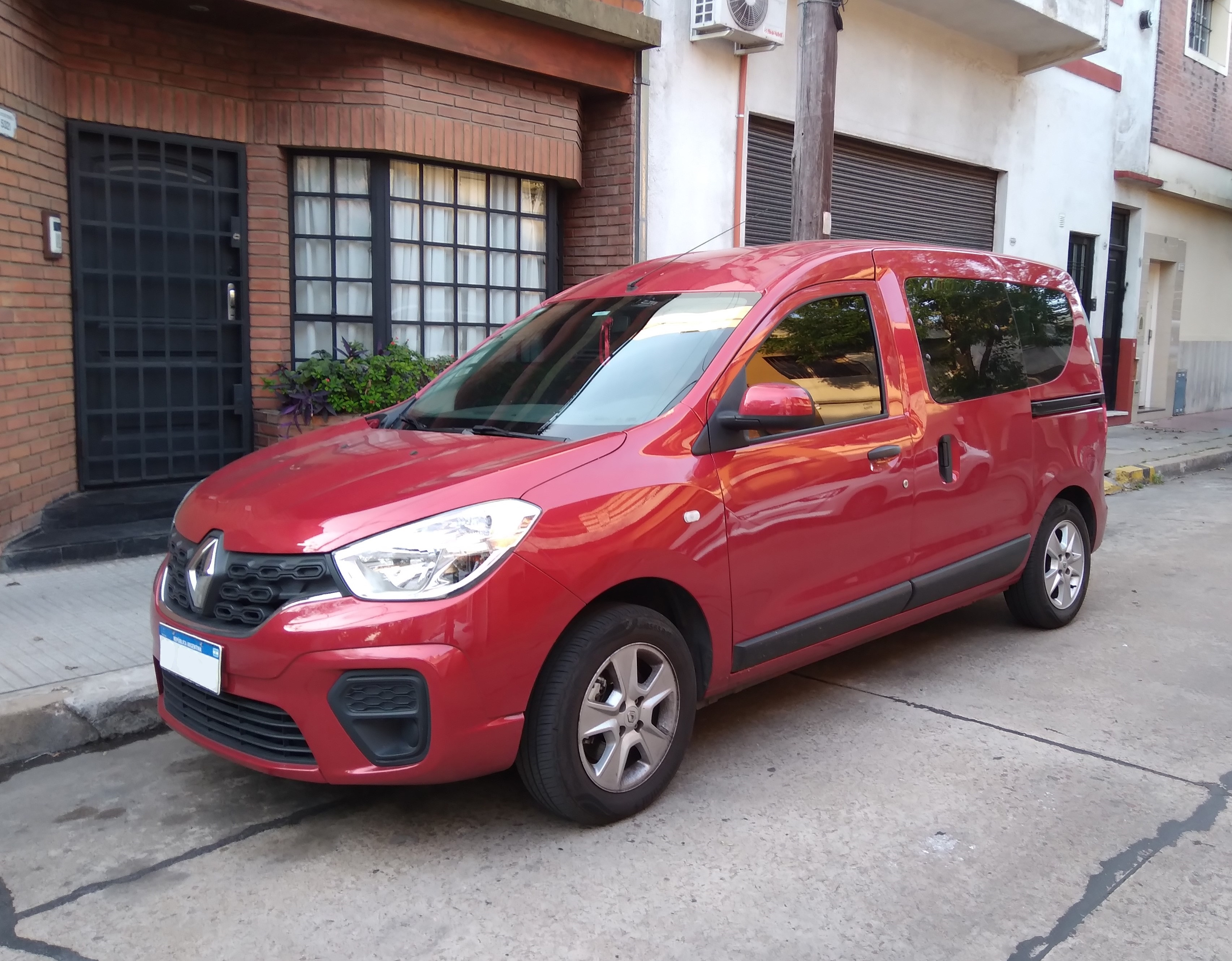
2022 Renault Kangoo (Argentina)

== Engines ==
Code	Capacity	Type	Power	Torque	Top speed	Acceleration 0–100 km/h (0-62 mph)	Combined consumption	CO_{2} emissions
H5Ft 402	1,198 cc	DOHC 16v Turbo	115 hp (86 kW; 117 PS) at 4500 rpm	190 N⋅m (140 lb⋅ft) at 2000 rpm	179 km/h (111 mph)	10.6 s	6.2 L/100 km (46 mpg_{‑imp}; 38 mpg_{‑US})	140 g/km
H5Ht	1,332 cc	DOHC 16v Turbo	130 hp (96 KW) available in EU		189 km/h (117 mph)	9 s	6.1 L/100 km	
K7M 812	1,598 cc	SOHC 8v	85 hp (63 kW; 86 PS) at 5000 rpm	134 N⋅m (99 lb⋅ft) at 2800 rpm	160 km/h (99 mph)	14.5 s	7.5 L/100 km (38 mpg_{‑imp}; 31 mpg_{‑US})	175 g/km
H4M 812	1,598 cc	DOHC 16v	102 hp (76 kW; 103 PS) at 4000 rpm	158 N⋅m (117 lb⋅ft) at 4000 rpm	170 km/h (106 mph)	12.7 s	6.2 L/100 km (46 mpg_{‑imp}; 38 mpg_{‑US})	140 g/km
K9K 612	1,461 cc	SOHC 8v Turbo Diesel	75 hp (56 kW; 76 PS) at 4000 rpm	180 N⋅m (133 lb⋅ft) at 1750 rpm	169 km/h (105 mph)	12.4 s	4.5 L/100 km (63 mpg_{‑imp}; 52 mpg_{‑US})	118 g/km
K9K 612	1,461 cc	SOHC 8v Turbo Diesel	90 hp (67 kW; 91 PS) at 3750 rpm	200 N⋅m (148 lb⋅ft) at 1750 rpm	175 km/h (109 mph)	11.6 s	4.5 L/100 km (63 mpg_{‑imp}; 52 mpg_{‑US})	118 g/km

== Safety ==
The Kangoo has front ventilated disc brakes.

It has ABS as standard, with electronic brakeforce distribution (EBD) and, optionally, can be equipped with electronic stability control (ESC). Standard equipment also includes airbags for driver and front passenger, as well as side airbags for head and chest.

The Kangoo in its most basic Latin American market configuration with 2 airbags and ESC received 3 stars for adult occupants and 4 stars for toddlers from Latin NCAP 2.0 in 2019.

Latin NCAP 2.0 test results Renault Kangoo + 2 Airbags (2019, based on Euro NCAP 2008)
Test	Points	Stars
Adult occupant:	21.56/34.0	3 /5 stars
Child occupant:	38.02/49.00	4 /5 stars
