= Dacia Lodgy =

Compact multi-purpose vehicle (MPV)

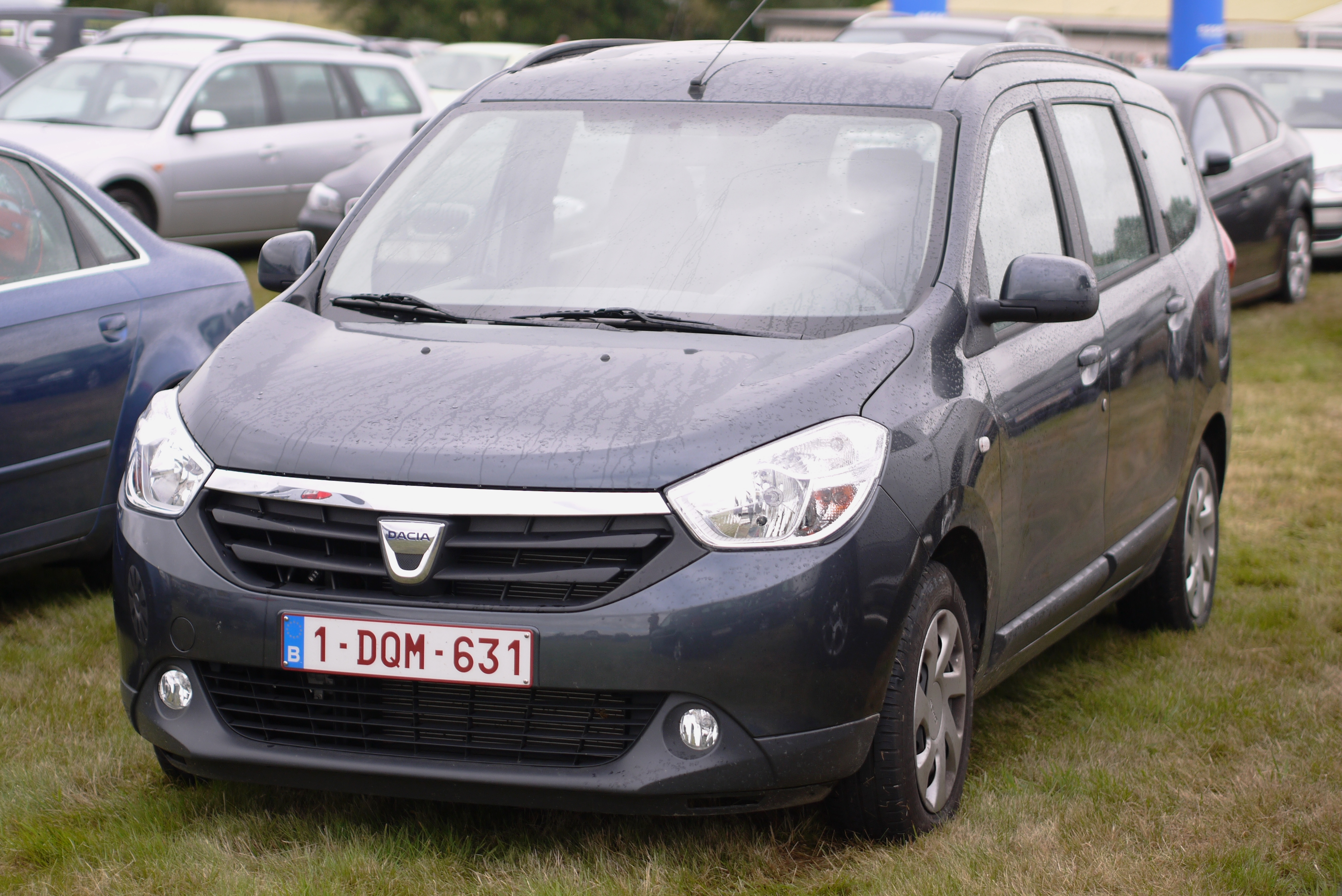
- 2013 Dacia Lodgy (pre-facelift)

Overview
- Manufacturer: Dacia (Renault)
- Also called: Renault Lodgy (CIS countries, Ukraine, India)
- Production: 2012–2024 (Morocco); 2015–2020 (India)
- Assembly: Morocco: Tangier; India: Chennai (Renault India)
- Designer: Renault Design Central Europe

Body and chassis
- Class: Compact MPV (M)
- Body style: 5-door MPV
- Layout: Front-engine, front-wheel-drive
- Platform: Dacia M0 platform
- Related: Dacia Dokker

Powertrain
- Engine: petrol: 1.2 L H5Ft turbo I4; 1.3 L H5Ht turbo I4; 1.6 L K7M I4; diesel: 1.5 L K9K turbo dCi I4
- Transmission: 5-speed manual 6-speed manual

Dimensions
- Wheelbase: 2,810 mm (110.6 in)
- Length: 4,498 mm (177.1 in)
- Width: 1,751 mm (68.9 in)
- Height: 1,680 mm (66.1 in)
- Curb weight: 1,165–1,337 kg (2,568–2,948 lb)

Chronology
- Predecessor: Dacia Logan MCV (Mk1)
- Successor: Dacia Jogger

The Dacia Lodgy is a compact MPV produced by the French manufacturer Renault and its Romanian subsidiary Dacia from 2012 to 2024. It was officially unveiled jointly by both brands at the 2012 Geneva Motor Show. The car was available only in LHD from launch, with front-wheel drive and a choice of five and seven seater models.

The Lodgy was manufactured at a Renault factory in Tangier, Morocco.

== Overview ==
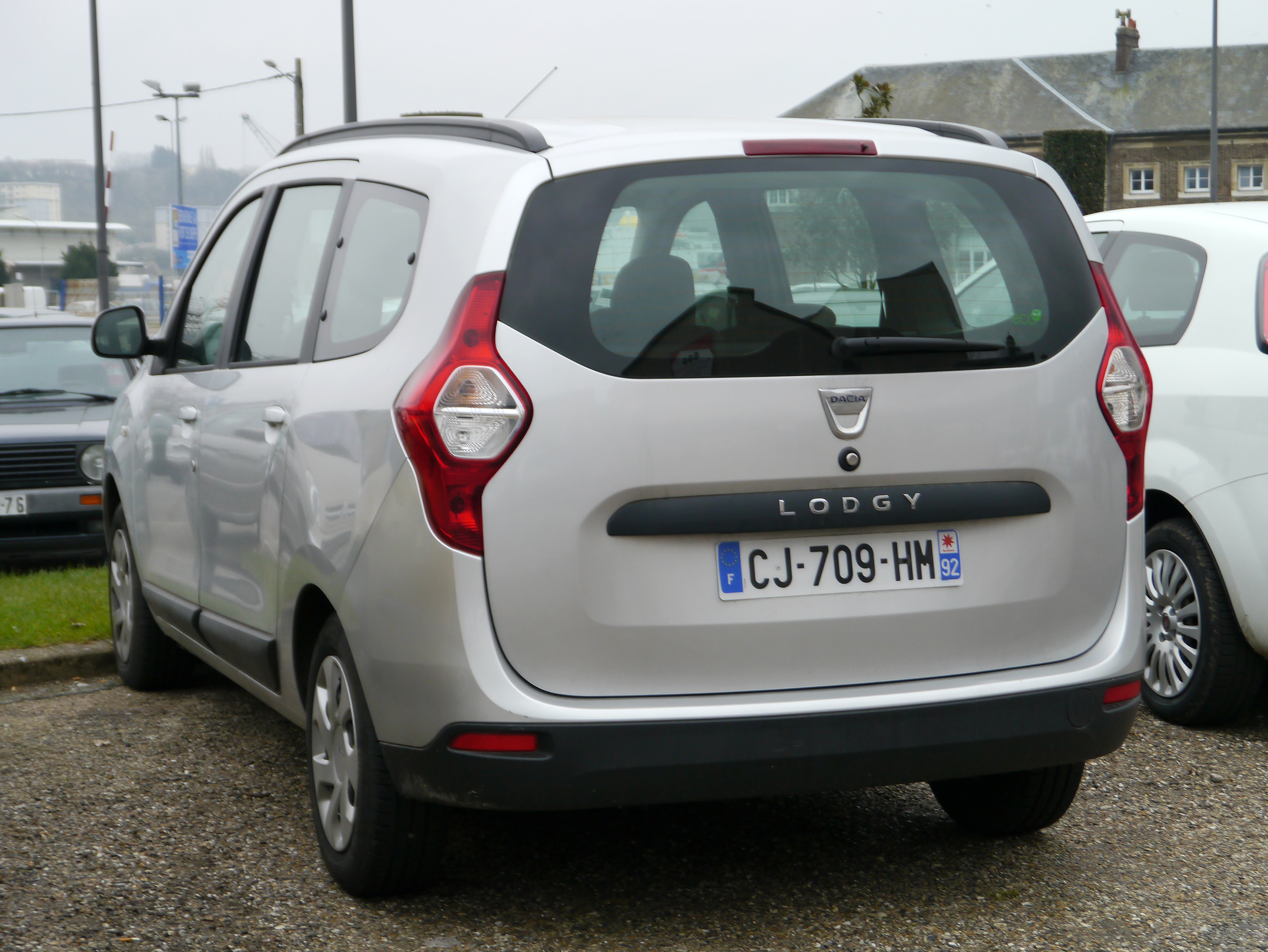
Rear view (pre-facelift)

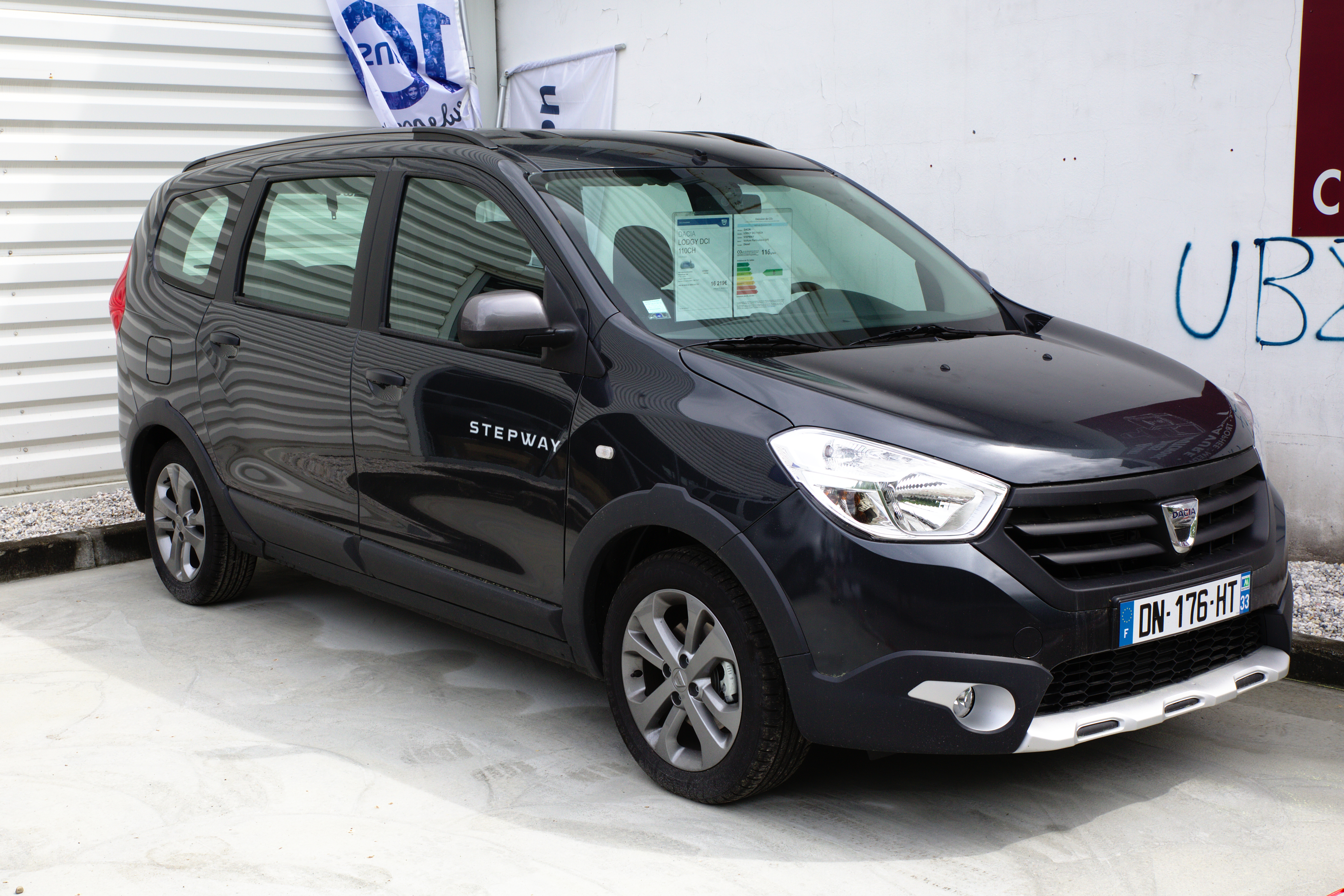
Lodgy Stepway (pre-facelift)

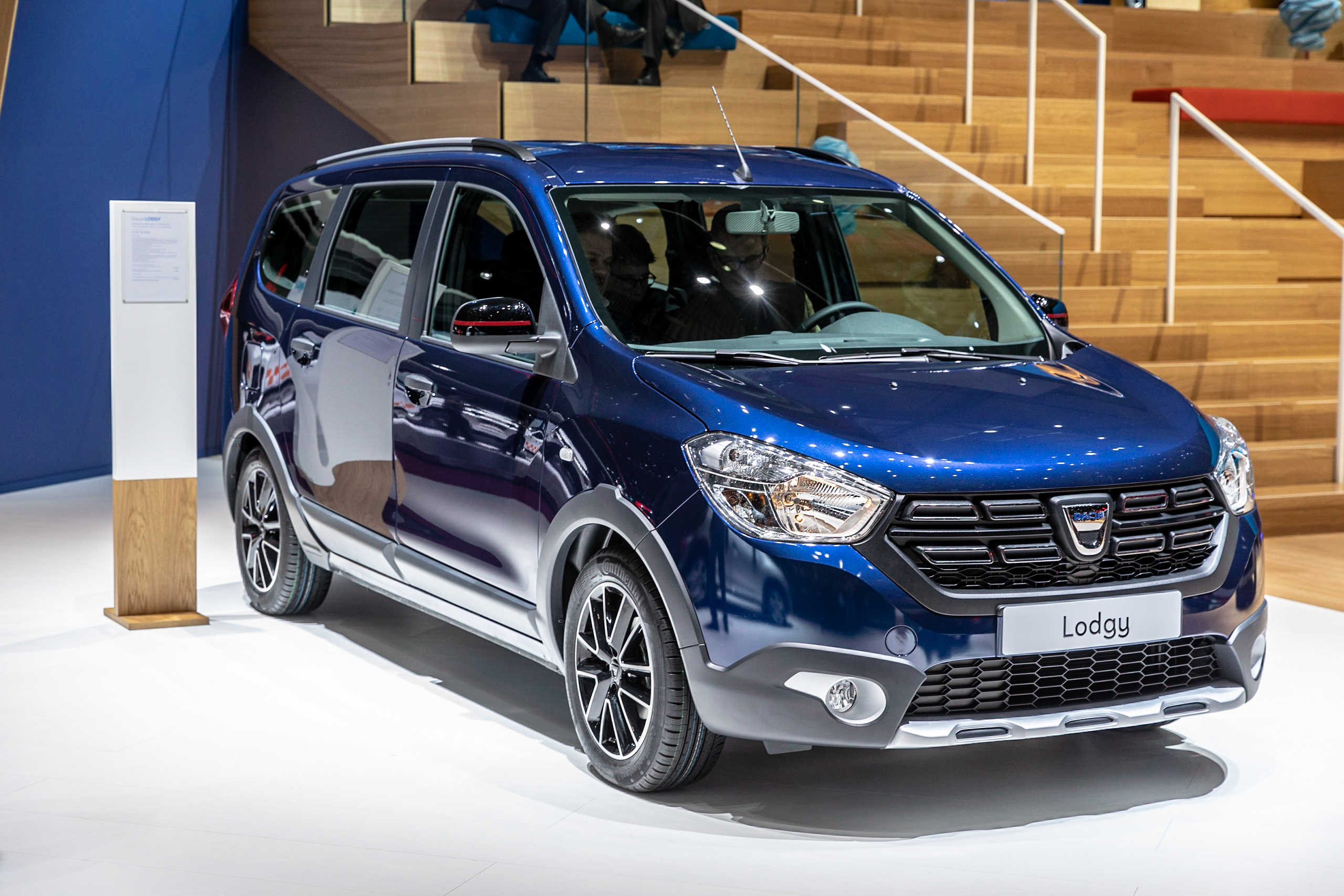
Lodgy Stepway (facelift)

The Lodgy shares the Dacia M0 platform with the contemporary Dacia Logan, Dacia Sandero and Renault Symbol. It is powered by a choice of four cylinder engines: a 1.5 L diesel (in two variants) and two petrol engines, a 1.6 L aspirated and a 1.2 L turbocharged Energy TCe 115.

Lodgy is the first Dacia model to offer a speed limiter, on the Laureate level, and a navigation system with a seven-inch touchscreen display, as an option. Bluetooth and USB connectivity, previously introduced on the Dacia Duster, are also available.

The Lodgy received three stars in Euro NCAP's crash test rating, considered to be the lowest result for a car in 2012. In the test, the rear passenger floor panel and tunnel were completely separated, and the transmission tunnel was deformed between the front seats.

The Lodgy was facelifted in 2017, which included subtle updates.

The Lodgy was discontinued in Europe in early 2022 following the introduction of the Dacia Jogger. The assembly of the vehicle continued until 2024 in Morocco for the domestic market.

=== India ===
Renault India launched its MPV Lodgy on 9 April 2015, at a base price Rs 8.19 lac. The Lodgy is offered in seven variants, namely: Lodgy std 85PS, Lodgy RxE 85PS, Lodgy RxL 85PS, Lodgy RxZ 85PS, Lodgy RxL 110PS, Lodgy RxZ 110PS 8 seater and Lodgy RxZ 110PS seven seater.

Its major exterior features includes twin slated grille, swept back headlamps, fog lamps, chrome highlights, contemporary taillight cluster, while major interior highlights are spacious cabin, large windows, seven and eight seater option, newly designed dashboard, touch screen infotainment system, comfortable seats and multi function steering wheel with cruise control toggles. It was discontinued in India in 2020.

== Engines ==
Code	Capacity	Type	Power	Torque	Top speed	Acceleration 0–100 km/h (0-62 mph)	Combined consumption	CO_{2} emissions
H5Ft 402	1,198 cc	DOHC 16v Turbo	115 PS (85 kW; 113 hp) at 4500 rpm	190 N⋅m (140 lb⋅ft) at 1500 rpm	179 km/h (111 mph)	10.6 s	6 L/100 km (47 mpg_{‑imp}; 39 mpg_{‑US})	140 g/km
H5H 470	1,333 cc	DOHC 16v Turbo	130 PS (96 kW; 128 hp) at 5000 rpm	240 N⋅m (177 lb⋅ft) at 1600 rpm	193 km/h (120 mph)	9.3 s	6.1 L/100 km (46 mpg_{‑imp}; 39 mpg_{‑US})	142 g/km
K7M 812	1,598 cc	SOHC 8v	85 PS (63 kW; 84 hp) at 5000 rpm	134 N⋅m (99 lb⋅ft) at 3000 rpm	160 km/h (99 mph)	14.5 s	7.1 L/100 km (40 mpg_{‑imp}; 33 mpg_{‑US})	165 g/km
K9K 612	1,461 cc	SOHC 8v Turbo Diesel	90 PS (66 kW; 89 hp) at 3750 rpm	200 N⋅m (148 lb⋅ft) at 1750 rpm	169 km/h (105 mph)	12.4 s	4.2 L/100 km (67 mpg_{‑imp}; 56 mpg_{‑US})	109 g/km
K9K 846	1,461 cc	SOHC 8v Turbo Diesel	110 PS (81 kW; 108 hp) at 4000 rpm	240 N⋅m (177 lb⋅ft) at 1750 rpm	175 km/h (109 mph)	11.6 s	4.4 L/100 km (64 mpg_{‑imp}; 53 mpg_{‑US})	116 g/km

== Lodgy Glace ==
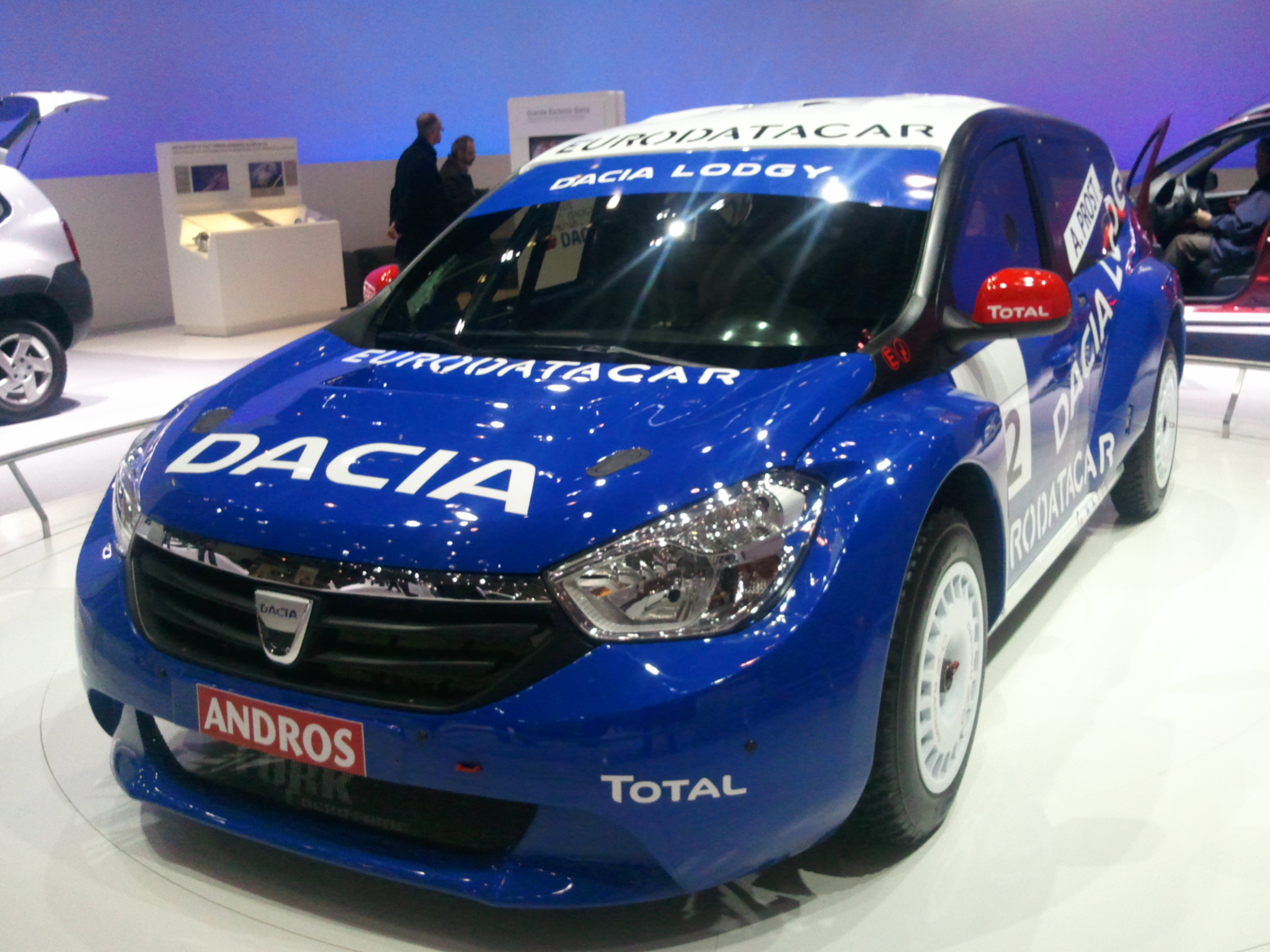
Lodgy Glace

In November 2011, Dacia announced that it would take part in the Andros Trophy, revealing the new Lodgy for the first time, in an ice racing version called Lodgy Glace. Unlike the production version, the Lodgy Glace featured a rear mid-engine, four-wheel-drive layout and was powered by a 3.0 litre V6 engine, which produced 355 bhp (265 kW; 360 PS) and 265 lb⋅ft (359 N⋅m) of torque.

Two models were raced by father and son Alain Prost and Nicolas Prost, and the third by Evens Stievenart. The team eventually won the competition, with Alain Prost as the first placed driver, gaining four victories and six other podium finishes.

The seven rounds took place in Val Thorens, Andorra, Alpe d'Huez, Isola 2000, Lans-en-Vercors, Saint-Dié-des-Vosges and Super Besse. It was the first MPV model to win the competition, and the second model from Dacia to compete in the Andros Trophy, after the Duster took part in the seasons of 2010 and 2011.

== Safety ==
The Renault Lodgy for India with no airbags and no ABS received 0 stars for adult occupants and 2 stars for toddlers from Global NCAP 1.0 in 2018 (similar to Latin NCAP 2013).

Global NCAP 1.0 test results (India) Renault Lodgy – No Airbags (2018, similar to Latin NCAP 2013)
Test	Score	Stars
Adult occupant protection	0.00/17.00	0 /5 stars
Child occupant protection	15.67/49.00	2 /5 stars
